= Republican Guard (Lebanon) =

Republican Guard Brigade
- الحرس الجمهوري اللبناني
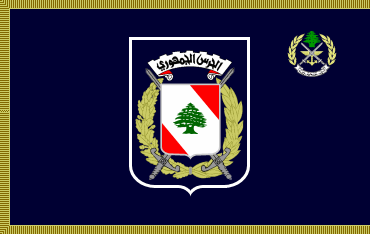
- Flag of the Republican Guard
- Active: 1984–present
- Country: Lebanon
- Branch: Lebanese Armed Forces
- Type: Republican guard
- Role: Close protection Internal security Law enforcement Raiding
- Size: 1200 - 4000; Four battalions, ranging between 300 and a thousand members each.
- Garrison/HQ: Beirut

The Republican Guard Brigade (Arabic: الحرس الجمهوري اللبناني, romanized: al-Ḥaras al-Ǧumhūrī al-Lubnāniyy), also known as the Presidential Guard Brigade, is a republican guard mounting unit of the Land Component of the Lebanese Armed Forces (LAF), attached to the Directorate-General of the Presidency of Lebanon.

== Insignia ==
The insignia of the Presidential Guard Brigade consists of:

1. The Lebanese flag in the form of a shield.
2. ‌‌ A wreath composed of two fronds of laurel and oak leaves.
3. ‌‌ Two crossed swords.
4. The background of the insignia is a shield colored navy blue.

‌The coat of arms of Lebanon is in the middle of the insignia, the two swords in its background, the wreath surrounding it. Above it are inscribed the words "Republican Guard".

== Structure and organization ==
The brigade comprises a 1st Battalion, 2nd Battalion, a Support Battalion, and a Logistics Battalion. The brigade was established on May 14, 1984, and was stationed in Baabda. Up until 1949, the Lebanese Republican Guard Brigade was called the Dragon brigade. The commander in 2005 was Brigadier General Mustafa Hamdan, who was accused of complicity in the assassination of former Lebanese Prime Minister Rafik Hariri in February 2005 and later released from prison without being cleared as innocent along with three other generals in April 2009. When President Lahoud stepped down at the end of his office, the brigade was reattached to the Army General Command.

== Role ==
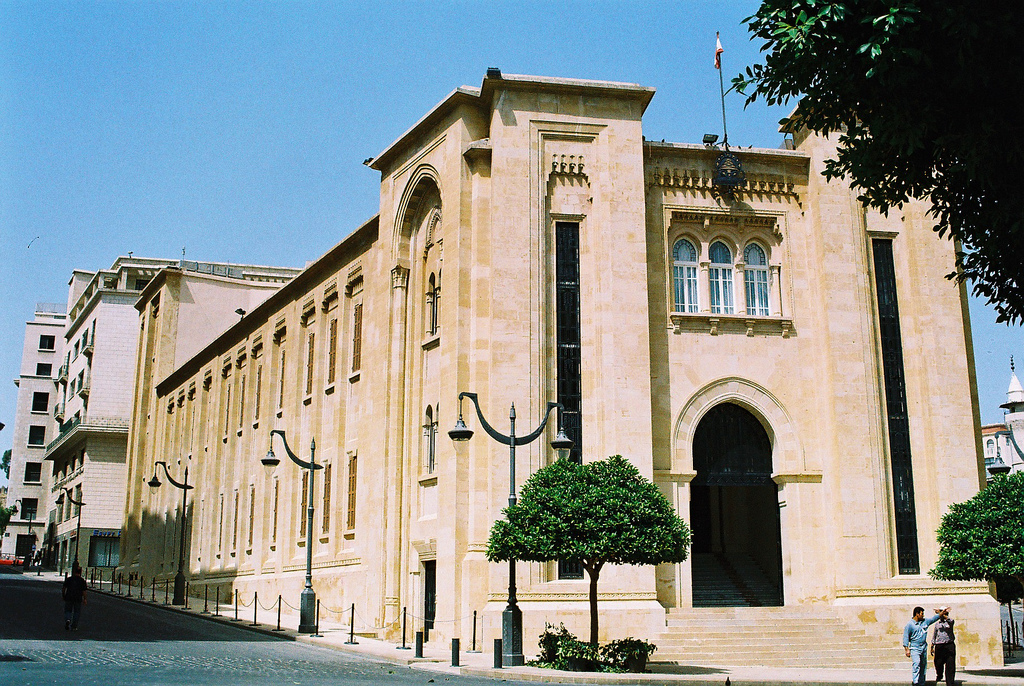
The Lebanese Parliament House in Nejmeh Square is one of the compounds guarded by the brigade.

The brigade's duties include providing escorts not only for the Lebanese President and its family, but also to the Prime Minister and cabinet members or to foreign visiting heads-of-state, and guards-of-honour at official public acts. They are also entrusted with guarding important public buildings in Beirut such as the Parliament House at Nejmeh Square and the nearby Grand Serail, an Ottoman-era palatial complex which houses the Prime Minister and the Council of Ministers' offices, and the Presidential Palace itself.

== See also ==
- Army of Free Lebanon
- Lebanese Arab Army
- Lebanese Armed Forces
- Lebanese Civil War
- Internal Security Forces
- Weapons of the Lebanese Civil War
- Zgharta Liberation Army
- 2nd Infantry Brigade (Lebanon)
- 3rd Infantry Brigade (Lebanon)
- 5th Infantry Brigade (Lebanon)
- 6th Infantry Brigade (Lebanon)
- 7th Infantry Brigade (Lebanon)
- 8th Infantry Brigade (Lebanon)
- 9th Infantry Brigade (Lebanon)
- 1958 Lebanon crisis
