= 4th Infantry Brigade (Lebanon) =

- Active: 1983 – 1984
- Country: Lebanon
- Allegiance: Lebanon
- Branch: Ground Forces
- Type: Mechanized infantry
- Role: Armoured warfare Combined arms Desert warfare Forward observer Maneuver warfare Raiding; Reconnaissance; Urban warfare
- Size: Brigade
- Engagements: Lebanese Civil War: Battle of Souk El Gharb of September 1983; Mountain War

Commanders
- Colonel: Jurj Haruq
- Colonel: Nayef Kallas

The 4th Infantry Brigade (Lebanon) was a Lebanese Army unit that fought in the Lebanese Civil War, being active from its creation in January 1983 until its destruction in September that year, in the wake of the Mountain War.

== Origins ==
In the aftermath of the June–September 1982 Israeli invasion of Lebanon, President Amin Gemayel, convinced that a strong and unified national defense force was a prerequisite to rebuilding the nation, announced plans to raise a 60,000-man army organized into twelve brigades (created from existing infantry regiments), trained and equipped by France and the United States. In late 1982, the 4th Infantry Regiment was therefore re-organized and expanded to a brigade group numbering 2,000 men, most of whom were Maronite Christians from the Mount Lebanon region and Druzes from the Chouf District, which became in January 1983 the 4th Infantry Brigade.

== Structure and organization ==
The new unit grew from an understrength battalion comprising three rifle companies to a fully equipped mechanized infantry brigade, capable of aligning a Headquarters' (HQ) battalion, an armoured battalion equipped with Staghound armoured cars, (soon replaced by Panhard AML-90 armoured cars), AMX-13 light tanks and thirty M48A5 main battle tanks (MBTs), three mechanized infantry battalions (41st, 42nd and 43rd) issued with fifty M113 and AMX-VCI armored personnel carriers (APC), plus an artillery battalion (45th) fielding US M101A1 105 mm towed field howitzers and FH-70 155 mm howitzers. The brigade also fielded a logistics battalion, equipped with 250 soft-skin vehicles of various types, which consisted of US M151A1 jeeps, Land-Rover long wheelbase series III, Jeep Gladiator J20, M880/M890 Series CUCV, Chevrolet C20 and Dodge Ram (1st generation) pickups, plus US M35A2 2½-ton (6x6) military trucks. Headquartered in the Mount Lebanon region, the brigade was initially commanded by Colonel Jurj Haruq, later replaced by Col. Nayef Kallas.

== Combat history ==
=== The Lebanese Civil War ===
In early September 1983, under the command of Colonel Nayef Kallas, Fourth Brigade's units were deployed at the towns of Khalde, Aramoun, Kabr Chmoun and the Shahhar-El-Gharbi region – where they relieved the Christian Lebanese Forces (LF) militia garrisons that had repulsed the first wave of ground assaults by the Druze People's Liberation Army (PLA) militia led by Walid Jumblatt and were running out of supplies – in the Chouf District, being entrusted with the mission of defending the southern approaches of Beirut. Like their colleagues of the Eighth Brigade led by Colonel Michel Aoun at Souk El Gharb, the Fourth Brigade bore the brunt of the Druze PLA attacks for three days, until it began to show signs of a confessional split in the ranks, since its Druze soldiers were reluctant to fight their coreligionists.

On February 13, 1984, a Shi'ite Amal Movement force succeeded in driving out other Lebanese Army units from their positions in the southern approaches to west Beirut, seizing Khalde (with the exception of the adjoining International Airport, still being held by the U.S. Marines' contingent of the Multinational Force in Lebanon), tightening the noose around the beleaguered Fourth Brigade. Lebanese Air Force Hawker Hunter jets flew their last combat sortie over the Chouf, carrying out air strikes against advancing Druze PLA forces on the western portion of the Shahhar-El-Gharbi region in support of the Fourth Brigade's units reinforced by the 101st Ranger Battalion from the 10th Airmobile Brigade fighting desperately to retain their positions at Aabey, Kfar Matta, Ain Ksour, and Al-Bennay, which achieved little success due to poor planning and lack of coordination with Lebanese Army units fighting on the ground. This situation was exacerbated by the fact that Lebanese National Salvation Front (LNSF) militias managed to intercept, alter, and retransmit Lebanese Army radio communications, which allowed them to impersonate the LAF command in east Beirut by ordering Fourth Brigade units to retreat to safer positions. Simultaneously, they ordered Lebanese Army's artillery units positioned at east Beirut to shell their own troops' positions in the western Chouf, which wreaked havoc among Fourth Brigade units and forced them to fall back in disorder towards the coast while being subjected to friendly fire.

On February 14, after linking up at Khalde with their Shi'ite Amal Movement allies, the Druze PLA militia forces drove the Fourth Brigade from their remaining positions in the western Shahhar-El-Gharbi region 3½ miles (about 4 km) south to the vicinity of Damour and Es-Saadiyat, in the Iqlim al-Kharrub coastal enclave, as they attempted to create a salient from Aley to the coast at Khalde, south of Beirut. Surrounded and badly mauled, the brigade disintegrated when approximately 900 Druze enlisted men, plus 60 officers and NCOs, deserted to join their coreligionists of Jumblatt's PLA or Syrian Social Nationalist Party (SSNP) militias. The remainder 1,000 or so Maronite Christian Officers' and men either withdrew to the coast, regrouping at the Damour – Es-Saadiyat area or fled south across the Awali River, seeking protection behind Israeli lines while leaving behind some US-made Tanks and APCs, Jeeps, trucks, Howitzers, and ammunition. After reaching Damour and Sidon, the soldiers were evacuated by sea under the auspices of the Lebanese Navy to east Beirut, where they enrolled in the 10th Airmobile Brigade and other Christian-dominated army units.

Most of the Fourth Brigade's abandoned equipment was shared by several Lebanese militias, namely the Lebanese Forces (LF), the Druze PSP/PLA, the Shia Amal Movement and the South Lebanon Army (SLA). According to a CIA report, at least a total of twenty-seven M48A5 MBTs, fourteen M113 APCs and thirty-four trucks were reportedly sighted stored at several locations north of the Awali River, including a quarry east of Al-Harah and other places along the coastal road between that river and Damour. The LF salvaged seven M48A5 MBTs, five AMX-13 light tanks, twelve Panhard AML-90 armoured cars, some M113 APCs, and a number of FH-70 155 mm howitzers, while the Druze militias seized forty-three M113 APCs and AMX-13 light tanks and seven M48A5 MBTs, as well as some M101A1 105 mm towed field howitzers. Amal seized a number of Panhard AML-90 armoured cars, AMX-13 light tanks, and AMX-VCI and M113 APCs, whilst the SLA also captured eight M113 APCs and a few AMX-VCI APCs and seven M48A5 tanks. The SLA, LF, Amal and the PSP/PLA also seized all the defunct brigade's liaison and transport vehicles, which the latter three militias turned into technicals by re-arming them with heavy machine guns, recoilless rifles and anti-aircraft autocannons.

== Disbandment ==
Despite having been destroyed in September 1983, the Fourth Brigade remained listed in the Lebanese Armed Forces (LAF) order-of-battle until its official disbandment in March 1984. Nevertheless, on a meeting held on 28 June that same year, the LAF Military Council decided to reform the Fourth Brigade but, due to political constraints, such plans were put on hold for the duration of the War. When the Lebanese Army Brigades were reorganized during the post-civil war period in the 1990s, the Army Command in the end opted for not reforming the Fourth Brigade (unlike the Second and Third Brigades, both disbanded in 1984-87 and re-activated in June 1991), and is not presently part of the LAF structure.

== See also ==
- Lebanese Armed Forces
- Lebanese Civil War
- Lebanese Forces
- List of weapons of the Lebanese Civil War
- List of extrajudicial killings and political violence in Lebanon
- Amal Movement
- Syrian Social Nationalist Party in Lebanon
- Mountain War (Lebanon)
- Progressive Socialist Party
- People's Liberation Army (Lebanon)
- 1st Infantry Brigade (Lebanon)
- 2nd Infantry Brigade (Lebanon)
- 3rd Infantry Brigade (Lebanon)
- 5th Infantry Brigade (Lebanon)
- 6th Infantry Brigade (Lebanon)
- 7th Infantry Brigade (Lebanon)
- 8th Infantry Brigade (Lebanon)
- 9th Infantry Brigade (Lebanon)
- 10th Infantry Brigade (Lebanon)
- 11th Infantry Brigade (Lebanon)
- 12th Infantry Brigade (Lebanon)
