= 10th Infantry Brigade (Lebanon) =

- Unit insignia of the 10th Infantry Brigade
- Active: 1984 – present
- Country: Lebanon
- Allegiance: Lebanon
- Branch: Ground Forces
- Type: Mechanized infantry
- Size: Brigade
- Nickname: the "Green Berets"
- Engagements: Lebanese Civil War: Battle of Souk El Gharb of September 1983; Mountain War; War of Liberation (1989–1990); War of Elimination (1990, Lebanon); October 13 massacre; Syrian civil war spillover in Lebanon: Qalamoun offensive (2014); Battle of Arsal

Commanders
- Colonel: Nassib Eid
- Colonel: Makhoul Hakmeh

The 10th Infantry Brigade (Lebanon) is a Lebanese Army unit that fought in the Lebanese Civil War, being active from its creation in January 1984.

== Origins ==
In the aftermath of the June–September 1982 Israeli invasion of Lebanon, President Amin Gemayel, convinced that a strong and unified national defense force was a prerequisite to rebuilding the nation, announced plans to raise a 60,000-man army organized into twelve brigades (created from existing infantry regiments), trained and equipped by France and the United States.

== Emblem ==
The Brigade's insignia consists of a brown eagle set on a blue sky background, swooping down on its prey symbolizing rapidity and precision in fixing and eliminating the target. The eye of the eagle symbolizes courage and fearlessness, and an expanded wing denotes protection of friendly forces.

== Structure and organization ==
By 1985 the 10th Brigade comprised an armoured battalion (104th) equipped with Panhard AML-90 armoured cars, AMX-13 light tanks (replaced in the 1990s by T-55A tanks donated by Syria), US M48A5 main battle tanks (MBTs), three mechanized infantry battalions (101st, 102nd, and 103rd) provisionally issued with US M113 armored personnel carriers (APC), an artillery battalion (105th) equipped with US M114 155 mm howitzers and a support company, the latter divided into one anti-tank and two heavy mortar sections equipped with French Hotchkiss-Brandt TDA MO-120-RT-61 120mm towed heavy mortars. The brigade also fielded a logistics support battalion, equipped with liaison and transport vehicles such as US M151A2 jeeps, Land-Rover long wheelbase series III (replaced by Land Rover Defender 90s and Humvees received in the 2000s), Chevrolet C20 and Dodge Ram (1st generation) pickups, plus US M35A2 2½-ton (6x6) military trucks. The Brigade's Headquarters in 1983 was located at the Shukri Ghanem Barracks in the Fayadieh District of East Beirut, and placed under the command of Colonel Nassib Eid, replaced in 1989 by Col. Makhoul Hakmeh.

== Combat history ==
=== The Lebanese Civil War ===
Commanded by Colonel Nassib Eid and reinforced by a Lebanese Army Commando battalion led by then Major Yusuf Tahan, the 10th Brigade during the Mountain War was deployed at east Beirut, where it was held in reserve and ready to support the other LAF Brigades in the field as required.

On February 13, 1984, the 101st Ranger Battalion was rushed to the western portion of the Shahhar-El-Gharbi region to reinforce the beleaguered units of the 4th Brigade, who were fighting desperately to retain their positions at Aabey, Kfar Matta, Ain Ksour, and Al-Beniyeh while sustaining a wave of ground assaults by the Druze People's Liberation Army (PLA) militia led by Walid Jumblatt.

==== The Liberation War 1989–1990 ====
Usually attached to the "Red Berets" of the Para-commando regiment (Arabic: فوج المغاوير transliteration Fauj al-Maghaweer) led by Lieutenant Colonel Yusuf Tahan (later replaced by Colonel Jihad Chahine), the "Green Berets" of the 10th Brigade had their units stationed along the Green Line, manning the Beirut-Damascus highway to the Kfarshima–Ash Choueifat front in the Baabda District. In 1987 both formations were tasked of defending the Fayadieh Military Academy and the large Army barracks complex adjacent to it.

During the 1989–1990 Liberation War, the 10th Brigade fought alongside the 8th Brigade against an alliance of Druze PSP/PLA, pro-Syrian Lebanese Forces – Executive Command (LFEC) and Palestinian militias backed by the Syrian Army at the second battle of Souk El Gharb on August 13, 1989. The militias' ground offensive was preceded by a massive and sustained Syrian artillery barrage on the positions held by Aounist troops, who repulsed the assault by inflicting some 20-30 casualties on the PSP/PLA attackers.

=== The post-civil war years 1990–present ===
Upon the end of the war in October 1990, the 10th Infantry Brigade was re-integrated into the structure of the Lebanese Armed Forces (LAF).

== See also ==
- Army of Free Lebanon (AFL)
- Lebanese Armed Forces
- Lebanese Civil War
- List of extrajudicial killings and political violence in Lebanon
- Lebanese Forces (militia)
- List of weapons of the Lebanese Civil War
- Mountain War (Lebanon)
- Progressive Socialist Party
- People's Liberation Army (Lebanon)
- 1st Infantry Brigade (Lebanon)
- 2nd Infantry Brigade (Lebanon)
- 3rd Infantry Brigade (Lebanon)
- 4th Infantry Brigade (Lebanon)
- 5th Infantry Brigade (Lebanon)
- 6th Infantry Brigade (Lebanon)
- 7th Infantry Brigade (Lebanon)
- 8th Infantry Brigade (Lebanon)
- 9th Infantry Brigade (Lebanon)
- 11th Infantry Brigade (Lebanon)
- 12th Infantry Brigade (Lebanon)
