= 9th Infantry Brigade (Lebanon) =

- Unit insignia of the 9th Infantry Brigade
- Active: 1984 – present
- Country: Lebanon
- Allegiance: Lebanon
- Branch: Lebanese Ground Forces
- Type: Mechanized infantry
- Role: Armoured warfare Close-quarters combat Combined arms Counter-battery fire Desert warfare Forward observer Maneuver warfare Raiding; Reconnaissance; Urban warfare
- Size: Brigade
- Engagements: Lebanese Civil War: Battle of Souk El Gharb of September 1983; Mountain War; War of Liberation (1989-1990); Syrian Civil War spillover in Lebanon: Qalamoun offensive (2014); Battle of Arsal

Commanders
- Colonel: Mounir Merhi
- Colonel: Sami Rihana
- Colonel: Ghassan Ged
- Colonel: Yamine
- General: Joseph Aoun

The 9th Infantry Brigade (Lebanon) is a Lebanese Army unit that fought in the Lebanese Civil War, and had been active since its creation in January 1984.

== Origins ==
In the aftermath of the June–September 1982 Israeli invasion of Lebanon, President Amin Gemayel, convinced that a strong and unified national defense force was a prerequisite to rebuilding the nation, announced plans to raise a 60,000-man army organized into twelve brigades (created from existing infantry regiments), trained and equipped by France and the United States. On March 1, 1983, the 9th Infantry Regiment was amalgamated with the Anti-tank Regiment, the Engineering Regiment and the 801st battalion into a brigade group numbering 2,000 men, mostly Maronite Christians from the northern Akkar and Koura Districts, though it also contained Sunni and Shia Muslims. Initially designated the General Support Brigade – GSB (Arabic: لواء الدعم العام | Liwa' al-Daem al-Eami), the new unit changed its name on September 10 of that year to "9th Brigade", which officially became on January 1, 1984, the 9th Infantry Brigade.

== Emblem ==
The Brigade's emblem consists of a grip holding a crossed red lightning symbolizing permanent readiness and rapid execution and the sword of Law, surmounted by an Arabic numeral (9) in gold and two drops of blood below symbolizing self-donation with no limits, all set on a black background.

== Structure and organization ==
The new unit grew from an understrength battalion comprising three rifle companies to a fully equipped mechanized infantry brigade, capable of aligning a Headquarters' (HQ) battalion, an armoured battalion (94th) equipped with Panhard AML-90 armoured cars, AMX-13 light tanks (replaced in the 1990s by T-55A tanks donated by Syria) and M48A5 main battle tanks, three mechanized infantry battalions (91st, 92nd and 93rd) issued with M113, AMX-VCI, and VAB armored personnel carriers, plus an artillery battalion (95th) fielding US M114 155 mm howitzers and various mortars. The Brigade also fielded a logistics battalion, equipped with US M151A2 jeeps, Land-Rover long wheelbase series III (replaced by Land Rover Defender 90s and Humvees received in the 2000s), Chevrolet C20 and Dodge Ram (1st generation) pickups and US M35A2 2½-ton military trucks. Headquartered at the Sayyad Roundabout Barracks in the Hazmiyeh district of east Beirut, the brigade was initially commanded by Colonel Mounir Merhi, replaced in 1984 by Col. Ghassan Ged, a Greek Orthodox. In 1985 he was replaced by Col. Sami Rihana, also a Greek Orthodox, in turn succeeded in 1989 by Col. Yamine.

== Combat history ==
=== The Lebanese Civil War ===
==== The Mountain War 1983-1984 ====
Commanded by Colonel Mounir Merhi, the 9th Brigade during the Mountain War was deployed at the Hazmiyeh and Sin el Fil eastern suburbs of Beirut. During the Battle for west Beirut on February 6, 1984, the 91st Infantry Battalion and the 94th Armoured Battalion under the command of Colonel Sami Rihana reinforced the other Lebanese Army units deployed in the western sector of the city fighting the anti-Government Muslim militias. Placed at the disposal of the Seventh Brigade's Command, these two battalions were positioned between the Port district and the Sodeco Square in the Nasra (Nazareth) neighbourhood of the Achrafieh district of east Beirut.

==== The post-Chouf years 1984-1990 ====
Regarded as being totally loyal to General Michel Aoun's interim military government, the majority of the brigade's battalions – except one (92nd), deployed at the Port district – were placed along the Hazmiyeh sector of the Green Line, where they fought successfully the Lebanese Forces (LF) militia faction led by Elie Hobeika during his failed coup attempt to seize control of east Beirut on January 16, 1986. The Brigade battled again the LF in February 1990, this time at the Badaro-Forn esh-Shebbak sector during the Elimination War.

=== The post-civil war years 1990-present ===
Upon the end of the war in October 1990, the 9th Brigade was re-integrated into the structure of the Lebanese Armed Forces (LAF).

== See also ==
- Lebanese Armed Forces
- Lebanese Civil War
- List of weapons of the Lebanese Civil War
- List of extrajudicial killings and political violence in Lebanon
- Lebanese Forces
- Amal Movement
- January 1986 Lebanese Forces coup
- Mountain War (Lebanon)
- Progressive Socialist Party
- People's Liberation Army (Lebanon)
- 1st Infantry Brigade (Lebanon)
- 2nd Infantry Brigade (Lebanon)
- 3rd Infantry Brigade (Lebanon)
- 4th Infantry Brigade (Lebanon)
- 5th Infantry Brigade (Lebanon)
- 6th Infantry Brigade (Lebanon)
- 7th Infantry Brigade (Lebanon)
- 8th Infantry Brigade (Lebanon)
- 10th Infantry Brigade (Lebanon)
- 11th Infantry Brigade (Lebanon)
- 12th Infantry Brigade (Lebanon)
