= 7th Infantry Brigade (Lebanon) =

- Insignia of the 7th Infantry Brigade
- Active: 1983–present
- Country: Lebanon
- Allegiance: Lebanon
- Branch: Lebanese Ground Forces
- Type: Mechanized infantry
- Role: Armoured warfare Close-quarters combat Combined arms Counter-battery fire Desert warfare Forward observer Maneuver warfare Raiding; Reconnaissance; Urban warfare
- Size: Brigade
- Engagements: Lebanese Civil War: Mountain War; War of Liberation (1989-1990); October 13 Massacre; Syrian Civil War spillover in Lebanon: Qalamoun offensive (2014); Battle of Arsal; Qalamoun offensive (2017)

Commanders
- General: Nadim al-Hakim
- Colonel: Issam Abu Jamra
- Colonel: Faris Lahud
- Colonel: Sami Rihana

The 7th Infantry Brigade (Lebanon) is a Lebanese Army unit that fought in the Lebanese Civil War, being active since its creation in June 1983.

== Origins ==
In the aftermath of the June–September 1982 Israeli invasion of Lebanon, President Amin Gemayel, convinced that a strong and unified national defense force was a prerequisite to rebuilding the nation, announced plans to raise a 60,000-man army organized into twelve brigades (created from existing infantry regiments), trained and equipped by France and the United States. In late 1982, the 7th Infantry Regiment was therefore re-organized and expanded to a brigade group numbering 2,000 men, most of whom were Maronite Christians from the Akkar and Koura Districts of northern Lebanon, and Shia Muslims and Druzes from the Chouf District, which became on June 20, 1983, at Scout City – Batroun, the 7th Infantry Brigade.

== Emblem ==
The brigade's emblem is characterized by an Arabic numeral (7) symbolizing victory, with a green cedar tree set in the middle and symbol of persistence, both encircled by a rampart representing an historical fortress with the motto "all for Lebanon" written in Arabic script. The black background is a symbol of endurance.

== Structure and organization ==
The new unit grew from an understrength battalion comprising three rifle companies to a fully equipped mechanized infantry brigade, capable of aligning a Headquarters' (HQ) battalion, an armoured battalion (74th) equipped with Panhard AML-90 armoured cars, AMX-13 light tanks (replaced in the late 1980s by T-55A tanks donated by Iraq), M48A5 main battle tanks, three mechanized infantry battalions (71st, 72nd and 73rd) issued with M113 armored personnel carriers, plus an artillery battalion (75th) fielding US M198 155 mm howitzers, and various mortars. The brigade also fielded a logistics battalion, equipped with US M151A2 jeeps, Land-Rover long wheelbase series III (replaced by Land Rover Defender 90s and Humvees received in the 2000s), Chevrolet C20 and Dodge Ram (1st generation) pickups and US M35A2 2½-ton military trucks. Initially headquartered at the Nohra Shalouhi Barracks near Batroun, in 1983 the brigade was commanded by the Druze General Nadim al-Hakim, who was concurrently the Lebanese Armed Forces (LAF) Chief-of-Staff, later replaced by Colonel Issam Abu Jamra (former commander of the 2nd Infantry Brigade), who was in turn succeeded by Col. Faris Lahud, formerly the head of the brigade's logistics battalion. In 1989, the latter was replaced by Col. Sami Rihana, previously the commander of the 9th Brigade.

== Combat history ==
=== Lebanese Civil War ===
==== The Mountain War 1983-1984 ====
During the Mountain War in early September 1983, 7th Brigade's units were deployed at Achrafieh and Hadath in Beirut, and at Dahr al-Wahsh facing Aley in the Chouf District southeast of the Lebanese Capital, where they faced the offensive of the main anti-government Druze militia, the People's Liberation Army (PLA) of the Progressive Socialist Party (PSP). Close to the end of the battle for Souk El Gharb on September 24, Gen. al-Hakim fled into PSP/PLA-held territory but he would not admit he had actually defected. The brigade's 72nd battalion positioned at Dahr al-Wahsh was driven out from the Chouf by the Druze PSP/PLA militia and forced to withdraw to East Beirut in February 1984. That same month, the brigade's predominately Shia Muslim 97th Battalion deserted en bloc to the Shi'ite 6th Infantry Brigade and the Amal Movement militia.

==== The post-Chouf years 1984-1990 ====
By 1987, the 7th Infantry Brigade was composed of 1,700 men under the command of Colonel Faris Lahud. A contingent of the brigade was stationed in the Byblos District, north of Beirut. This contingent was regarded as loyal to former President and leader of the Zgharta Liberation Army (ZLA) militia Suleiman Frangieh, whose feudal seat, Zgharta, is a few kilometers southwest of Tripoli. Consequently, the central government equipped this contingent with light weapons only. The brigade's headquarters was relocated to Amsheet, just north of Jounieh. Units at Amsheet were well equipped with US-made M48 tanks and M113 armored personnel carriers but were regarded as being under the sway of Lebanese Forces militia' Supreme Commander Samir Geagea, who maintained there his retinue.

During General Michel Aoun's Liberation War in 1989-1990, the 7th Brigade led by Colonel Sami Rihana put a spirited defense of Madfoun and Kfar Abida in the Batroun District on 13–14 August 1989, inflicting heavy losses on attacking Syrian Army armored columns and later on September 13, the brigade's units positioned at Mneitra were subjected to heavy mortar fire by the Syrians. To contradict false rumors that some units from both the 7th Brigade and the 2nd Brigade were preparing themselves to defect to Syrian-controlled territory and launch an assault on Madfoun, Chebtin and Sghar, Col. Rihana placed the former Brigade on full alert and issued a general mobilization order of all the unit's armored, infantry, and artillery formations held in reserve at Amsheet barracks and at Madfoun. On January 16, 1990, following a chilling of relations between Gen. Aoun's interim military government in East Beirut and the Lebanese Forces militia Command in Amsheet, the former instructed the 7th Brigade to conduct night security patrols with their military vehicles in the region of Byblos, Amsheet and Nahr Ibrahim to help maintain order.

=== The post-civil war years 1990-present ===
Upon the end of the war in October 1990, the 97th Battalion was returned to the 7th Brigade, which was re-integrated into the structure of the Lebanese Armed Forces (LAF).

== See also ==
- Lebanese Armed Forces
- Lebanese Civil War
- List of extrajudicial killings and political violence in Lebanon
- Amal Movement
- Lebanese Forces
- List of weapons of the Lebanese Civil War
- Mountain War (Lebanon)
- Zgharta Liberation Army (ZLA)
- 1st Infantry Brigade (Lebanon)
- 2nd Infantry Brigade (Lebanon)
- 3rd Infantry Brigade (Lebanon)
- 4th Infantry Brigade (Lebanon)
- 5th Infantry Brigade (Lebanon)
- 6th Infantry Brigade (Lebanon)
- 8th Infantry Brigade (Lebanon)
- 9th Infantry Brigade (Lebanon)
- 10th Infantry Brigade (Lebanon)
- 11th Infantry Brigade (Lebanon)
- 12th Infantry Brigade (Lebanon)
