= 6th Infantry Brigade (Lebanon) =

- Insignia of the 6th Infantry Brigade
- Active: 1983 – present
- Country: Lebanon
- Allegiance: Lebanon
- Branch: Lebanese Ground Forces
- Type: Mechanized infantry
- Role: Armoured warfare Combined arms Counter-battery fire Desert warfare Forward observer Maneuver warfare Raiding; Reconnaissance; Urban warfare
- Size: Brigade
- Engagements: Lebanese Civil War: Battle of Souk El Gharb of September 1983; Mountain War; War of the Camps; Syrian Civil War spillover in Lebanon: Qalamoun offensive (2014); Battle of Arsal

Commanders
- Colonel: Michel Aoun
- Colonel: Lufti Jabar
- Major general: Abd al-Halim Kanj
- General: Fadi Daoud
- General: Johnny Akl

The 6th Infantry Brigade is a Lebanese Army unit that fought in the Lebanese Civil War, being active since its creation in January 1983.

== Origins ==
In the aftermath of the June–September 1982 Israeli invasion of Lebanon, President Amin Gemayel, convinced that a strong and unified national defense force was a prerequisite to rebuilding the nation, announced plans to raise a 60,000-man army organized into twelve brigades (created from existing infantry regiments), trained and equipped by France and the United States. In late 1982, the 6th Infantry Regiment was therefore re-organized and expanded to a brigade group numbering 1,600–2,000 men, mostly Shia Muslims, though this total originally also included a number of Maronite Christians, which became on January 18, 1983, the 6th Defence Brigade (Arabic: لواء الدفاع السادس | Liwa' al-Difa'a al-Sa'adis), later changed on February 6, 1983, to 6th Infantry Brigade.

== Emblem ==
The Brigade's emblem is composed of a two-color background setting, blue on top and red below. A charging golden ram head with a fire tail prodding from the neck is set at the middle, symbolizing the will to attack and assail with determination and resolution; a golden Arabic numeral (6) inserted on a white ring is placed below.

== Structure and organization ==
The new unit grew from an understrength battalion comprising three rifle companies to a fully equipped mechanized infantry brigade, capable of aligning a Headquarters' (HQ) battalion, an armoured battalion (64th) equipped with Alvis Saladin armoured cars, AMX-13 light tanks, M48A5 main battle tanks, and three mechanized infantry battalions (61st, 62nd and 63rd) issued with M113, Alvis Saracen and VAB (4x4) armored personnel carriers, plus an artillery battalion (65th) fielding US M114 155 mm howitzers, and various mortars. The Brigade also fielded a logistics battalion, equipped with US M151A2 jeeps, Land-Rover long wheelbase series III, Chevrolet C20 and Dodge Ram (1st generation) pickups and US M35A2 2½-ton military trucks. New vehicles such as Humvees and Polaris Ranger 4×4s were later received in the 2000s. Later in the war, the brigade received from Syria a consignment of 30 to 50 Soviet T-55A main battle tanks and a number of Chinese Type 63 107mm multiple rocket launchers.

Headquartered at the Henri Chihab Barracks at Jnah, in the south-western Chyah suburb of West Beirut, the formation was subsequently enlarged to 6,000 men by absorbing Shia deserters from other Army units – which included the 97th Battalion from the Seventh Brigade – after they went over to their coreligionists of the Amal Movement following the collapse of the government forces in February 1984. Thus by 1985 the reinforced Brigade, now under the operational control of the Amal militia, aligned a tank battalion, three to four mechanized infantry battalions on tracked and wheeled APCs, and an artillery battalion.

== Combat history ==
=== The Lebanese Civil War ===
Between 2 and 15 October 1982, while it was still being formed, the new 6th Defence Brigade under the command of Colonel Michel Aoun re-entered West Beirut alongside other Lebanese Army units and the Internal Security Forces (ISF), ostensibly to carry out the pacification of the Muslim-populated districts of the Capital city. Acting in collusion with the Christian Lebanese Forces militia, they arrested 1,441 Muslims (other sources indicate a higher number, some 2,000) who were either members or supporters of Leftist political groups and subsequently disappeared; none was heard of again.

Commanded by the Shiite Colonel Lutfi Jabar, who was formerly attached to the Syrian-dominated Arab Deterrent Force, the Sixth Brigade's primary mission during the Mountain War had been to maintain order and security in West Beirut. After the Brigade split off from the Army command structure on February 6, 1984, it was taken over by a new officer, the Shi'ite Colonel (later, Major general) Abd al-Halim Kanj; those Christian officers and enlisted men who remained loyal to the Lebanese Government left the Brigade and were evacuated under Amal fighters' escort to East Beirut, where they enrolled in other Christian-controlled Army units. On July 24, 1984, the Sixth Brigade intervened to curb fighting in West Beirut between the Sunni Al-Mourabitoun and Druze People's Liberation Army (PLA) militias.

During the War of the Camps in May 1985, the Sixth Brigade supported the Amal militia against the pro-Arafat Palestinian camp militias in the battle for the control of the Sabra and Shatila and Bourj el-Barajneh refugee camps in West Beirut. However, it refused to participate in the February 1986 clashes between the Amal militia and the Lebanese Army, and as a result, the Fifth Brigade was expelled from West Beirut. In 1987 the Sixth brigade deserted again to join their coreligionists.

=== The post-civil war years 1990-present ===
Upon the end of the war in October 1990, the Sixth Brigade was re-integrated into the structure of the Lebanese Armed Forces (LAF), with the 97th Battalion being returned to the Seventh Brigade.

== See also ==
- Lebanese Armed Forces
- Lebanese Civil War
- List of extrajudicial killings and political violence in Lebanon
- Amal Movement
- Lebanese Forces
- List of weapons of the Lebanese Civil War
- Mountain War (Lebanon)
- Progressive Socialist Party
- People's Liberation Army (Lebanon)
- 1st Infantry Brigade (Lebanon)
- 2nd Infantry Brigade (Lebanon)
- 3rd Infantry Brigade (Lebanon)
- 4th Infantry Brigade (Lebanon)
- 5th Infantry Brigade (Lebanon)
- 7th Infantry Brigade (Lebanon)
- 8th Infantry Brigade (Lebanon)
- 9th Infantry Brigade (Lebanon)
- 10th Infantry Brigade (Lebanon)
- 11th Infantry Brigade (Lebanon)
- 12th Infantry Brigade (Lebanon)
