= 8th Infantry Brigade (Lebanon) =

- Unit insignia of the 8th Infantry Brigade
- Active: 1983 – present
- Country: Lebanon
- Allegiance: Lebanon
- Branch: Lebanese Ground Forces
- Type: Mechanized infantry
- Size: Brigade
- Engagements: Lebanese Civil War: Battle of Souk El Gharb of September 1983; Mountain War; War of the Camps; War of Liberation (1989–1990); October 13 massacre; Syrian civil war spillover in Lebanon: Qalamoun offensive (2014); Battle of Arsal

Commanders
- General: Abdul Karim Hachem
- General: Michel Aoun
- General: Salim Kallas

The 8th Infantry Brigade (Lebanon) (Arabic: لواء المشاة الثامن) is a Lebanese Army unit that fought in the Lebanese Civil War, being active since its creation in January 1983.

== Origins ==
In the aftermath of the June–September 1982 Israeli invasion of Lebanon, President Amin Gemayel, convinced that a strong and unified national defense force was a prerequisite to rebuilding the nation, announced plans to raise a 60,000-man army organized into twelve brigades (created from existing infantry regiments), trained and equipped by France and the United States. In late 1982, the 8th Infantry Regiment was therefore re-organized and expanded to a brigade group numbering 2,000 men, of whom 80% were Maronite Christians from the Akkar District of northern Lebanon, with the remaining 20% were Sunni Muslims, which became on 1 January 1983, the 8th Infantry Brigade.

== Emblem ==
The Brigade's emblem consists of the following elements:

- The Arabic numeral (8): represents the number of the Brigade.
- The Cedar: symbolizing the immortality of Lebanon.
- The Sword: symbolizing the firm right in confronting the enemy.
- A lightning at the base: symbolizing the execution with lightning speed.
- Armor: symbolizing the immunity in defending the country.
- The Laurel: symbolizing the laurel that only grows amongst rocks at the highest mountain peaks, indicating the strength and steadiness of the Brigade.

== Structure and organization ==
The new unit grew from an understrength battalion comprising three rifle companies to a fully equipped mechanized infantry brigade, capable of aligning a Headquarters' (HQ) battalion, an armoured battalion equipped with Panhard AML-90 armoured cars, AMX-13 light tanks (replaced in the 1990s by T-55A tanks donated by Syria) and thirty-four US M48A5 main battle tanks (MBTs), three mechanized infantry battalions (87th, 83rd and the other battalion designation is unknown) issued with ninety US M113 armored personnel carriers (APC) and an artillery battalion (85th) fielding eighteen US M114 155 mm howitzers and various mortars, including a battery of twelve French Hotchkiss-Brandt TDA MO-120-RT-61 120mm towed heavy mortars. The brigade also fielded a logistics support battalion, equipped with liaison and transport vehicles such as US M151A2 jeeps, Land-Rover long wheelbase series III (replaced by Land Rover Defender 90s and Humvees received in the 2000s), Chevrolet C20 and Dodge Ram (1st generation) pickups, plus US M35A2 2½-ton (6x6) military trucks. The Brigade's Headquarters was located at Rihaniyeh, in the Baabda District of East Beirut, whilst its units were stationed in the environs of the Ministry of Defense complex at Yarze, also located at Baabda.

== Combat history ==
=== The Lebanese Civil War ===
==== The Mountain War 1983-1984 ====
In 1983, Lebanese Internal Security Forces (ISF) positions in the southern suburbs and western part of Beirut were occupied by the Druze. The 8th Brigade was deployed to recapture these positions by force. During this period, with the sudden withdrawal of the Israel Defense Forces (IDF) from Mount Lebanon to the Southern Lebanese region, the pro-Syrian fighters mainly composed of Palestinian and Druze militias supported by Syrian army tanks and artillery stormed the Christian villages in the Bhamdoun and Chouf Districts, forcing their inhabitants to flee the atrocity while seeking refuge in the Christian town of Deir el-Kamar. The 8th Brigade was once again deployed to the Souk El Gharb ridge, to block the advancement of the pro-Syrian militias from reaching deeper into the Christian zones and threatening the ministry of Defense in Yarze, as well as, the Presidential Palace in Baabda. The 8th Brigade fiercely defended a 15 miles front, turning back numerous attempts to take over the remainder of the Christian zones.

From 1983 through 1984, the 8th Brigade bore the brunt of the battles against Druze militias in Suq al Gharb and against leftist militias in West Beirut, instigated by the Syrian government to promote its control over Lebanon amid the failure of Lebanese-Israeli peace talks.

==== The post-Chouf years 1984-1988 ====
In June 1984, all parties agreed on an ultimate cease-fire, in order to form a national government. General Michel Aoun was named Army Commander; Colonel Salim Kallas, who achieved an outstanding performance as deputy chief of staff of the 8th Brigade, was appointed the new Brigade Commander.

From 1984 to 1985, in the wake of a political Lebanese crisis, the Syrian government tried to impose constitutional amendments by using the pro-Syrian militias to infiltrate the lines of the autonomous Christian zones. The 8th Brigade's mission was to halt the Syrian government involvement and to stop pro-Syrian militias' attacks by defending the Christian zones.

During the War of the Camps in May 1985, the 87th Infantry Battalion from the 8th Brigade supported their Shi'ite colleagues of the 6th Brigade and the Shia Muslim Amal militia against the pro-Arafat Palestinian camp militias in the battle for the control of the Sabra and Shatila and Bourj el-Barajneh refugee camps in West Beirut.

On 15 January 1986, the 8th Brigade was ordered to contain the schismatic internal fighting inside the Lebanese Forces upon the signature of the so-called "Tripartite Accord" in Damascus by Elie Hobeika, the commander of the Maronite Christian Lebanese Forces militia, Walid Jumblatt of the Druze Progressive Socialist Party/People's Liberation Army (PSP/PLA), Nabih Berri of the Shia Muslim Amal Movement militia and the Syrian government. The deputy chief of the Lebanese forces Samir Geagea opposed the agreement and led a coup to remove Elie Hobeika from his command. Elie Hobeika conceded to hand over his authority to Samir Geagea and to leave the Christian zones. The 8th Brigade strived to safely remove Elie Hobeika and his men from their headquarters in East Beirut to the Ministry of Defense in Yarze, in order to be deported to the Christian town of Zahle in the Syrian-controlled Beqaa Valley. After ten days of Elie Hobeika's deportation, fighters from the Syrian Social Nationalist Party (SSNP) militia supported by Syrian Army tanks and field artillery devastated the Lebanese Army positions on the Hills overlooking Bikfaya, the home town of President Amine Gemayel, in the Northern Matn district. The 8th Brigade was ordered to swiftly counterattack and block the SSNP militiamen from progressing deeper towards Bikfaya. After three days of fierce fighting, the Brigade stemmed the advance, restored the Army defensive lines, and drove the SSNP fighters back to their original positions in the Dhour El Choueir village.

From 1986 to 1988, the 8th Brigade was once again deployed on the Souk El Gharb Front to face the resurging Druze PSP/PLA militia's hostilities backed up by Syrian Army tanks and artillery. The confrontation evolved into a costly war of attrition that placed a great strain on President Gemayel's government to accept a Syrian-mediated political deal. In November 1988, President Amine Gemayel's term in office ended without the election of a new president. Gemayel relinquished his authority to a transition government formed of the members of the "Army Supreme Military Council" headed by General Michel Aoun as prime minister. The Eight brigade was the strongest, best equipped, best trained, and most elite unit in the Lebanese Arm. It was regarded as loyal to the president and the government. it consisted of 2,000 men, about 80 percent of whom were Christians from the northern region of Akkar, with the remaining 20 percent Sunni Muslims. It included a mechanized battalion equipped with ninety US-made armored personnel carriers, an armored battalion with thirty-three US-made M-48 tanks, and an artillery battalion equipped with eighteen field artillery pieces. It was stationed at the Presidential Palace at Baabda and at the Ministry of Defense in the Yarze section of Beirut.

==== The Liberation War 1989-1990 ====
On 14 March 1989, the internal political challenge to elect a President reached its climax, the Syrian threat widened its assault by striking hard on urban Christian-held areas. To halt the growing Syrian interference, General Aoun declared a "Liberation War". The 8th Brigade was charged to face any Syrian new involvement in the Christian zones. The fighting was disrupted by periods of calmness and a series of failed cease-fire and endless negotiations for peace settlements. In August 1989, in the midst of this restive period, the Army Command decided to pull out the 8th Brigade from the Souk El Gharb Front.

On 13 August 1989, following three days of continuous Syrian shelling to suppress Lebanese Army defenses and its military facilities, large numbers of heavy-equipped Druze PSP/PLA fighters and leftist militias attacked the Souk el Gharb Front. The Druze PSP/PLA militia, reinforced by Soviet T-55A tanks and supported by heavy artillery, occupied the high ground of "Keyfoun's Fortress" and penetrated other parts of the Souk El Gharb Front while attempting to descend the ridge towards the Presidential Palace. The 8th Brigade was redeployed to restore the lines and to push out the Druze PSP/PLA's advancement. After a severe daylong battle, the Druze were demoralized by the on rushing 8th Brigade's infantry troops and armored units. The Druze fighters were "routed" in full flight out of the occupied areas and at five o'clock in the evening their defeat was total. Local and international Newspapers, Radio and TV stations blared out the news of this battle as a great victory for General Salim Kallas and his brave soldiers.

==== The Elimination War 1989-1990 ====
In January 1990, upon the election of Elias Hraoui for Presidency according to the Taif Agreement, a struggle arose inside the Christian autonomous zones. Samir Geagea commander of the Lebanese Forces intended to overthrow the antagonistic rival Prime Minister General Michel Aoun for refusing the Taif Agreement. In support of Prime Minister Michel Aoun, the 8th Brigade took control of the Southern and Northern parts of the Matn District from Samir Geagea's LF militia forces. As a result of the retreat of the Lebanese Forces to the Keserwan District, the 8th Brigade deployed its troops to defensive positions on a 30-mile separation front between the Northern Matn and the Keserwan.

==== The 13 October 1990 offensive and the end of the civil war ====
On 13 October 1990 the Syrian Army, given an international green light, invaded the last of the autonomous Lebanese zones controlled by Prime Minister General Michel Aoun in order to end his "Rebellion" and to put in office President Elias Hrawi. The latter was elected in November 1989, under the terms of the Taif Agreement signed and ratified by the Lebanese Parliament in an uncommon session held in Saudi Arabia in an attempt to end the Lebanese Civil War. Following the Syrian invasion, a political transition occurred, with Elias Hrawi assuming his full presidential authority, whilst General Aoun was exiled to France and General Salim Kallas was removed from his command on 16 November 1990.

In conclusion, from 1983 to 1990, the 8th Brigade made its reputation in mounting offensive operations based on mobility, speed and surprise. The 8th Brigade won its fame in a string of victorious battles, where it suffered numerous casualties. General Salim Kallas proved great professional field experience and assertive skills in leading his troops to success. Throughout his command, his strategy was to maintain the Sovereignty, protect the integrity and bring peace to the Homeland.

=== The post-civil war years 1990-present ===
Upon the end of the war in October 1990, the 8th Brigade was re-integrated into the structure of the Lebanese Armed Forces (LAF).

== See also ==
- Lebanese Armed Forces
- Lebanese Civil War
- List of extrajudicial killings and political violence in Lebanon
- Amal Movement
- Lebanese Forces
- Mountain War (Lebanon)
- List of weapons of the Lebanese Civil War
- People's Liberation Army (Lebanon)
- Progressive Socialist Party
- War of the Camps
- 1st Infantry Brigade (Lebanon)
- 2nd Infantry Brigade (Lebanon)
- 3rd Infantry Brigade (Lebanon)
- 4th Infantry Brigade (Lebanon)
- 5th Infantry Brigade (Lebanon)
- 6th Infantry Brigade (Lebanon)
- 7th Infantry Brigade (Lebanon)
- 9th Infantry Brigade (Lebanon)
- 10th Infantry Brigade (Lebanon)
- 11th Infantry Brigade (Lebanon)
- 12th Infantry Brigade (Lebanon)
