= 2nd Infantry Brigade (Lebanon) =

Lebanese Army unit

- Unit insignia of the 2nd Infantry Brigade
- Active: 1983–1987; 1991–present
- Country: Lebanon
- Allegiance: Lebanon
- Branch: Lebanese Ground Forces
- Type: Mechanized infantry
- Role: Armoured warfare Close-quarters combat Combined arms Counter-battery fire Desert warfare Forward observer Maneuver warfare Raiding; Reconnaissance; Urban warfare
- Size: Brigade
- Engagements: Lebanese Civil War: Mountain War; Bab al-Tabbaneh–Jabal Mohsen conflict; War of Liberation (1989–1990); Syrian Civil War spillover in Lebanon: North Lebanon clashes (2014)

Commanders
- Colonel: Issam Abu Jamra
- Colonel: Yehiya Raad

The 2nd Infantry Brigade (Lebanon) is a Lebanese Army unit that fought in the Lebanese Civil War, being active since its creation in January 1983 until its self-disbandment in 1987, being subsequently re-formed in June 1991.

== Origins ==
In the aftermath of the June–September 1982 Israeli invasion of Lebanon, President Amin Gemayel, convinced that a strong and unified national defense force was a prerequisite to rebuilding the nation, announced plans to raise a 60,000-man army organized into twelve brigades (created from existing infantry regiments), trained and equipped by France and the United States. In late 1982, the 2nd Infantry Regiment was therefore re-organized and expanded to a brigade group numbering 2,000 men, most of whom were Sunni Muslims from the Akkar District of northern Lebanon, which became on January 18, 1983, at Scout City – Batroun, the 2nd Infantry Brigade.

== Emblem ==
The Brigade's emblem consists of a gilded shining sun motif on the upper half and a red colour setting on the lower half. The sun motif symbolizes light irradiating hope and sovereignty, whilst the red setting symbolizes blood and sacrifice; at the centre of the sun is set a green map of Lebanon with a national Lebanese flag on top, both forming the Arabic number (2). Superimposed below in the red blood setting is a white V-shaped chevron pointed down bearing "Second Brigade" written in black Arabic script, being flanked on each side by a pair of crossed rifle-and-sword motifs symbolizing the Brigade's readiness to sacrifice itself for Lebanon.

== Structure and organization ==
The new unit grew from an understrength battalion comprising three rifle companies to a fully equipped mechanized infantry brigade, capable of aligning a Headquarters' (HQ) battalion, an armoured battalion (24th) equipped with Panhard AML-90 armoured cars, AMX-13 light tanks (replaced in the late 1980s by T-54A tanks donated by Syria) and M48A5 main battle tanks (MBTs), three mechanized infantry battalions (21st, 22nd and 23rd) issued with M113 armored personnel carriers (APC), plus an artillery battalion (25th) fielding US M114 155 mm howitzers, and various mortars. The Brigade also fielded a logistics battalion, equipped with US M151A2 jeeps, Land-Rover long wheelbase series III (replaced by Land Rover Defender 90s and Humvees received in the 2000s), Chevrolet C20 and Dodge Ram (1st generation) pickups, and US M35A2 2½-ton (6x6) military trucks. Initially headquartered at the Nohra Shalouhi Barracks near Batroun in 1983, the Brigade's HQ was later moved to the Bahjat Ghanem Barracks at Tripoli, and placed under the command of Colonel Issam Abu Jamra, replaced in 1984 by Col. Yehiya Raad, a Sunni Muslim.

== Combat history ==
=== The Lebanese Civil War ===
==== Security operations in Tripoli 1984–1987 ====
Commanded by Colonel Issam Abu Jamra, the Second Brigade during the Mountain War was deployed at the northern port city of Tripoli as part of the Lebanese Armed Forces (LAF) Northern Command. As such, the Brigade took no part in the September 1983 battles for the Chouf District nor the February 1984 battle for the control of the western districts of Beirut. Instead, the LAF Northern Command tasked the Second Brigade of internal security operations in Tripoli, where tensions remained high between local Islamist and secular Left-wing militias following the departure of Palestine Liberation Organization (PLO) guerrilla factions in December 1983. In August 1984, violent clashes erupted between the main Sunni Islamic Unification Movement or IUM (a.k.a. Tawheed) and the Shia Alawite Arab Democratic Party or ADP, with the former been supported by the Mosques Committee and the Islamic Committee. The Tawheed's position was strengthened when they gained control of the port area on August 22, after a fierce battle on the streets of Tripoli that left more than 400 dead. Street fighting dragged for some days until September 18, when it was brought to an end by a Syrian-mediated peace agreement between the IUM and the ADP.

In mid-December 1984, the LAF Command issued an operational order which called for the deployment of the Lebanese Army to Tripoli as part of a security plan devised for the port city and the north. On December 20, Second Brigade units under the command of Col. Yehiya Raad were deployed throughout the city's districts from the Military Beach Club (French: Bain Militaire) to Bohsas in the South. Military posts were established at the Tripoli port and adjacent refinery, Maloula, the Abu Ali roundabout, the Mitein road crossing, the municipal stadium, Marana, Al-Hareicha, Baal Mohsen, Kobbeh, Abu Samra, and Bohsas. A command post was set up in the Al-Loukmane School, close to the Military Beach Club. Second Brigade's battalions began to conduct military vehicle patrols on the streets and set up roadblocks and checkpoints in sensitive areas, in order to search civilian automobiles and passers-by. A military source stated on December 21 that the Lebanese Army's deployment in the Tripoli area was accomplished without much difficulty, with only a few minor incidents being reported. Commandeered backhoe loaders began to dismantle the barricades erected at the Bab al-Tabbaneh district (the main IUM/Tawheed stronghold) and the Jabal Mohsen district (the main ADP stronghold) under the protection of Lebanese Army soldiers and Internal Security Forces (ISF) gendarmes. Militiamen from all factions withdrew from the streets, with their heavy and medium weapons being collected and stored in depots placed under the custody of the Lebanese Army and the ISF. Within a few days of the Second Brigade's deployment in the capital of North Lebanon, the situation was almost completely calm. Life returned to a measure of normalcy and economic activities were resumed, allowing the city's residents to concentrate themselves in the repairing of public infrastructures damaged or destroyed during the fighting, such as buildings and roads.

Although the security measures implemented by the Second Brigade in and around Tripoli were a relative success, law and order did not prevail. In the fall of 1985 the Syrian Army entered the city and crushed the Tawheed militia, but intermittent clashes occurred again in the Tripoli area during the Spring and Summer of 1986, this time between the Tawheed and the pro-Syrian faction of the Syrian Social Nationalist Party (SSNP), until Syrian troops finally moved in to enforce a truce at the request of local community leaders. Violence flared up again on December 18, 1986, when the Tawheed commander Samir al-Hassan was arrested by the Syrians and his men responded by killing 15 Syrian soldiers at a checkpoint, which brought the wrath of the Syrians on the Tawheed. Aided by a coalition of ADP, SSNP, Lebanese Communist Party/Popular Guard, and Baath Party militias, the Syrians managed to defeat decisively the Tawheed in another round of brutal fighting on the streets of Tripoli, killing many of its fighters, arresting others and scattered the remainder.

During this conflict, the Second Brigade kept itself neutral and remained confined to their Tripoli barracks. Forced into inactivity, the Brigade self-disbanded in 1987 and its units had dispersed.

==== The Liberation War 1989–1990 ====
Despite being disbanded, the Second Brigade remained listed in the Lebanese Army's order-of-battle and its "dispersed" battalions were involved in General Michel Aoun's Liberation War in 1989–1990, when they and their colleagues of the Seventh Brigade were the subject of false rumors claiming that some units of both brigades were preparing themselves to defect to Syrian-controlled territory and launch an assault on Government-held positions at Madfoun, Chebtin and Sghar.

=== The post-civil war years 1990–present ===
Upon the end of the war in October 1990, the LAF Command proceeded to reorganize and expand the Lebanese Army's battered mechanized infantry brigades structure, with the Second Brigade being officially re-established in Tripoli on June 1, 1991.

== See also ==
- Lebanese Armed Forces
- Lebanese Civil War
- List of extrajudicial killings and political violence in Lebanon
- Lebanese Forces
- List of weapons of the Lebanese Civil War
- Mountain War (Lebanon)
- Progressive Socialist Party
- People's Liberation Army (Lebanon)
- Popular Guard
- 1st Infantry Brigade (Lebanon)
- 3rd Infantry Brigade (Lebanon)
- 4th Infantry Brigade (Lebanon)
- 5th Infantry Brigade (Lebanon)
- 6th Infantry Brigade (Lebanon)
- 7th Infantry Brigade (Lebanon)
- 8th Infantry Brigade (Lebanon)
- 9th Infantry Brigade (Lebanon)
- 10th Infantry Brigade (Lebanon)
- 11th Infantry Brigade (Lebanon)
- 12th Infantry Brigade (Lebanon)
