= 5th Infantry Brigade (Lebanon) =

- Unit insignia of the 10th Infantry Brigade
- Active: 1983 – present
- Country: Lebanon
- Allegiance: Lebanon
- Branch: Lebanese Ground Forces
- Type: Mechanized infantry
- Role: Armoured warfare Close-quarters combat Combined arms Counter-battery fire Desert warfare Forward observer Maneuver warfare Raiding; Reconnaissance; Urban warfare
- Size: Brigade
- Engagements: Lebanese Civil War: Battle of Souk El Gharb of September 1983; Mountain War; War of Liberation (1989–1990); October 13 massacre; Syrian Civil War spillover in Lebanon: Qalamoun offensive (July–August 2017)

Commanders
- Colonel: Gabriel Arsuni
- Colonel: Khalil Kanaan

The 5th Infantry Brigade (Lebanon) is a Lebanese Army unit that fought in the Lebanese Civil War, being active since its creation in January 1983.

== Origins ==
In the aftermath of the June–September 1982 Israeli invasion of Lebanon, President Amin Gemayel, convinced that a strong and unified national defense force was a prerequisite to rebuilding the nation, announced plans to raise a 60,000-man army organized into twelve brigades (created from existing infantry regiments), trained and equipped by France and the United States. In late 1982, the 5th Infantry Regiment was therefore re-organized and expanded to a brigade group numbering 2,000 men, mostly Maronite Christians from Mount Lebanon, which became on January 1, 1983, the 5th Infantry Brigade.

The new Infantry Brigade traced back its roots to a previous unit, the 5th Lebanese special mountain brigade of the colonial Special Troops of the Levant (French: Troupes Spéciales du Levant or TSL), raised earlier on June 1, 1943, during the French mandate over Lebanon and Syria. In July 1945 a French-Lebanese military agreement was signed, officially signalling the disbandment of the TSL, broken up to form the new Lebanese and Syrian national armies. By the end of the month, a hodgepodge of colonial units comprising the 5th Lebanese special mountain brigade plus other smaller formations transferred from the disbanded 3rd, 6th and 7th TSL coastal brigades, was mustered together at the town of Zahlé in the Beqaa Valley and consolidated into the new Lebanese Army which was officially founded on August 1, 1945, under the command of then Colonel Fuad Chehab.

== Emblem ==
The brigade's emblem is composed of a Phoenix, a legendary bird that lives through five centuries, set on a sky-blue background, holding the Arabic numeral (5) five and emerging from the flames symbolizing sacrifice and resurrection, surmounted by the motto "From my ashes Lebanon arises" written in Arabic script.

== Structure and organization ==
The new unit grew from an understrength battalion comprising three rifle companies to a fully equipped mechanized infantry brigade, capable of aligning a Headquarters' (HQ) battalion, an armoured battalion (54th) equipped with Panhard AML-90 armoured cars, AMX-13 light tanks (replaced in the 1990s by T-55A tanks donated by Syria) and M48A5 main battle tanks (MBTs), three mechanized infantry battalions (51st, 52nd and 53rd) issued with M113 armored personnel carriers (APC), plus an artillery battalion (55th) fielding US M114 155 mm howitzers, and various mortars. The brigade also fielded a logistics battalion, equipped with US M151A2 jeeps, Land-Rover long wheelbase series III (replaced by Land Rover Defender 90s and Humvees received in the 2000s), Chevrolet C20 and Dodge Ram (1st generation) pickups, and US M35A2 2½-ton (6x6) military trucks. Initially commanded in 1983 by Colonel Gabriel Arsuni, later replaced by Colonel Khalil Kanaan, by 1987 the brigade was stationed at Brummana in the Matn District east of Beirut, with its administrative headquarters being located at the Raymond el-Hayek Barracks in Sarba, north of Jounieh, which was a Lebanese Forces (LF) stronghold.

== Combat history ==
=== The Lebanese Civil War ===
Under the orders of Col. Kanaan, the Fifth Brigade was positioned at the Sin el Fil suburb east of Beirut in the Matn District as a reserve force, and the brigade's primary mission during the Mountain War was to provide support to the other Lebanese Army Brigades deployed in the Greater Beirut area. On February 6, 1984, the LAF Command of the Greater Beirut area decided to send the 52nd Infantry Battalion in M113 APCs supported by a Tank squadron provided with M48A5 MBTs on a routine patrol mission, whose planned route was to pass through the Dora suburb, the Museum crossing in the Corniche el Mazraa, the Barbir Hospital in the Ouza'i district, the Kola bridge, and the Raouché seafront residential and commercial neighbourhood. Alerted by the presence of such a large military force entering west Beirut – which they viewed suspiciously as being abnormally reinforced for a simple routine mission – Amal militia forces misinterpreted this move as a disguised attempt by Government forces to seize the Shia-controlled southwestern suburbs of the Lebanese capital by force. An alarmed Amal Command promptly issued a general mobilization order in the ranks of its militia, and as soon as the Lebanese Army patrol arrived at the Fouad Chehab bridge near the Barbir Hospital, they fell into an ambush. Several M48 Tanks that were leading the column were hit by dozens of RPG-7 anti-tank rounds, which brought the advance of the entire patrol to a halt.

During the February 1986 clashes in West Beirut between the Shia Amal militia and the Lebanese Army, the Fifth Brigade was expelled to East Beirut after the predominately Shia Sixth Brigade refused to participate in the fighting against their coreligionists of Amal. In 1987 Fifth brigade units were deployed to the strategic town of Souk El Gharb to prevent Druze artillerymen of the People's Liberation Army (PLA) militia from shelling the capital. By the late 1980s, the Fifth Brigade was regarded as loyal to the President of Lebanon, but observers believed that if called upon to fight a Christian militia, it might remain neutral. During the final days of the civil war, the Fifth Brigade held Souk El Gharb until October 13, 1990, when the unit was overpowered by an alliance of Druze PSP/PLA, Christian Lebanese Forces – Executive Command (LFEC) and Syrian Social Nationalist Party (SSNP) militias and Syrian Army troops.

=== The post-civil war years 1990–present ===
Upon the end of the war in October 1990, the Fifth Brigade was re-integrated into the structure of the Lebanese Armed Forces (LAF).

== See also ==
- Army of Free Lebanon
- Lebanese Armed Forces
- Lebanese Civil War
- List of extrajudicial killings and political violence in Lebanon
- Lebanese Forces
- List of weapons of the Lebanese Civil War
- Mountain War (Lebanon)
- Progressive Socialist Party
- People's Liberation Army (Lebanon)
- War of Liberation (1989–1990)
- 1st Infantry Brigade (Lebanon)
- 2nd Infantry Brigade (Lebanon)
- 3rd Infantry Brigade (Lebanon)
- 4th Infantry Brigade (Lebanon)
- 6th Infantry Brigade (Lebanon)
- 7th Infantry Brigade (Lebanon)
- 8th Infantry Brigade (Lebanon)
- 9th Infantry Brigade (Lebanon)
- 10th Infantry Brigade (Lebanon)
- 11th Infantry Brigade (Lebanon)
- 12th Infantry Brigade (Lebanon)
