= Sami Rihana =

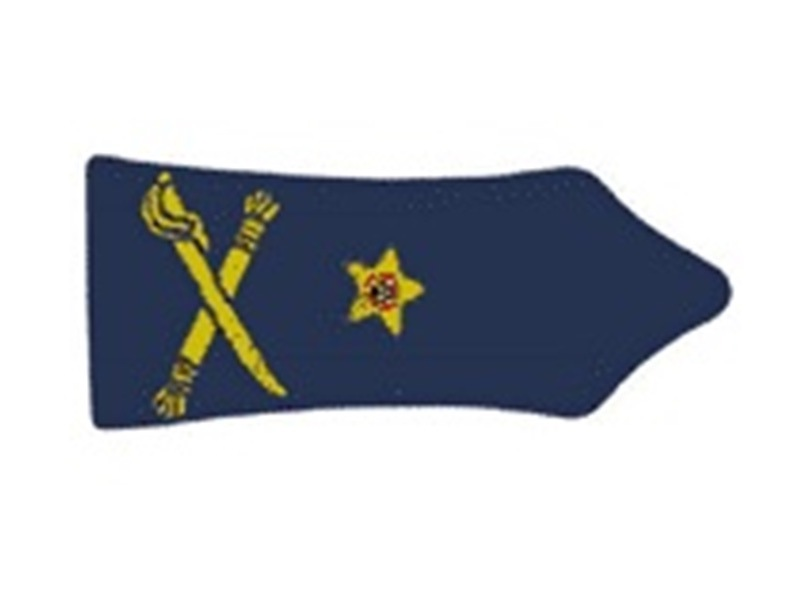
Lebanese Army: Brigadier General insignia

Sami Habib Rihana (Arabic: سامي حبيب ريحانا; born 6 February 1941) is a Lebanese Brigadier General in the Lebanese army, a historian with two PhDs from Paris-Sorbonne University (Paris IV) and a publisher.

Born in the village of Kousba in the Koura District of North Lebanon in 1941, he enrolled in the Lebanese military school in 1958 and followed several formations in his military career in France, Belgium and the United States.

He ran in the 2022 Lebanese General Elections for the Greek Orthodox seat in North 3 (Bcharre – Zgharta – Koura – Batroun).

== Formation ==
- 1956 – 1958: Lebanon - Military school
- 1962 – 1963: France - Military training
- 1976: USA - "Follow me" infantry advanced course - United States Infantry School - Fort Benning, Georgia
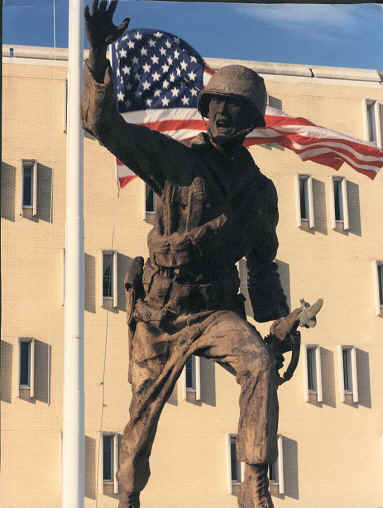
  Iron Mike statue at Fort Benning, Alabama, Georgia, USA
- 1979: USA - Military management course
- 1981 – 1983: Belgium - Breveté d'Etat Major
- 1983: France - Doctorat de troisième cycle (PhD) - Paris-Sorbonne University (Paris IV)
- 1986: France - Doctorat d'état (PhD) - Paris-Sorbonne University (Paris IV)

== Functions ==
=== Military positions ===
- 1968 – 1971: Company commander
- 1978 – 1981: Battalion commander
- 1984 – 1985: Commander of the demilitarized zone in Beirut
- 1983 – 1985: Chief of the cease fire Committee in Lebanon
- 1985 – 1990: Commander of the 7th Infantry Brigade
- 1992 – 1999: Chief of the situation room in the presidential palace

=== Functions ===
- 1975 – 1976: Professor of military history at the officers school
- 1988 – 1999: Professor of military history at the armed forces school
- 1989 – 2003: Professor of history at the Lebanese University
- 2000 to date: Chairman & General Manager of Nobilis Publishing House

== Works ==
- 1988: The Contemporary History of the Lebanese Army (Volume 1): The origins - The Orient legion and the auxiliary troops of the Levant (1916–1926) • Histoire de l'armée libanaise contemporaine (Tome 1): Les origines - La légion d'Orient et les troupes auxiliaires du Levant (1916-1926)
- 1993: Encyclopedia of the rural heritage (3 volumes)
- 1996: The Contemporary History of the Lebanese Army (Volume 2): The special troops of the Levant and the army of the independence (1926–1946) • Histoire de l'armée Libanaise contemporaine: Les Troupes spéciales du Levant et l'Armée de l'indépendance (1926-1946)
- 1996: The military societies across history
- 1998: The world at the dawn of the 21st century
- 2001: The people of the ancient near-east
- 2002: The history of the economy
- 2002: Lebanon across centuries (10 volumes)
- 2005: Arabs battles encyclopedia (24 volumes)
- 2006: The July 2006 war encyclopedia (10 volumes)
- 2007: The war of Nahr El Bared 2007
- Legends and peoples of the world (10 volumes)
- Lebanon's presidential and ministerial crises (16 volumes)
- Michel Aoun encyclopedia (18 volumes)
- Kamal Joumblat encyclopedia (18 volumes)

== Honors ==
- Ordre National du Mérite Francais
- Cedar Medal (Lebanon)
- War Medal (Lebanon)
- National Order of Merit (Lebanon)
