= Al Bennay =

Village in Mount Lebanon Governorate, Lebanon

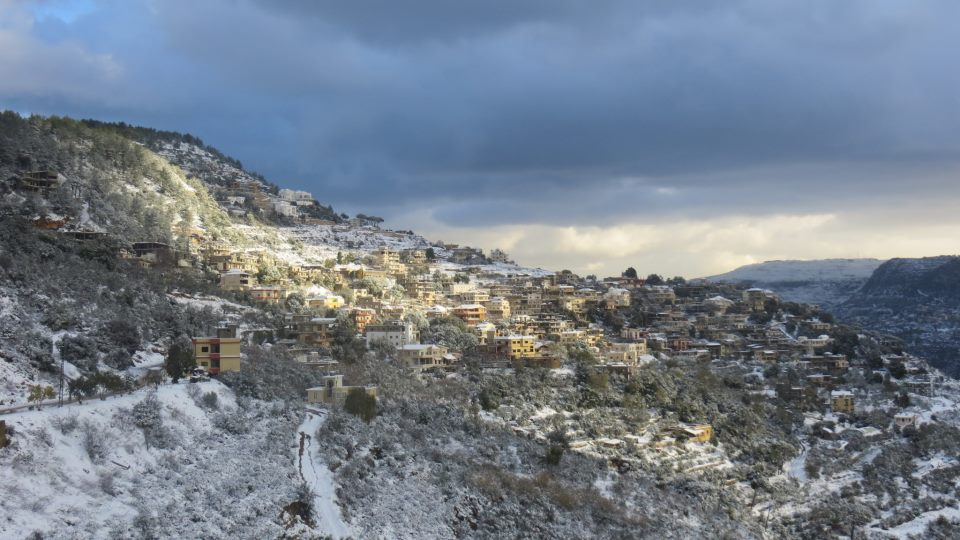
Al Bennay البنيه

Al Bennay (Arabic: البنيه), is a village in Mount Lebanon, Aley District, Mount Lebanon Governorate, Lebanon.
