= Ain Ksour =

Ain Ksour عين كسور
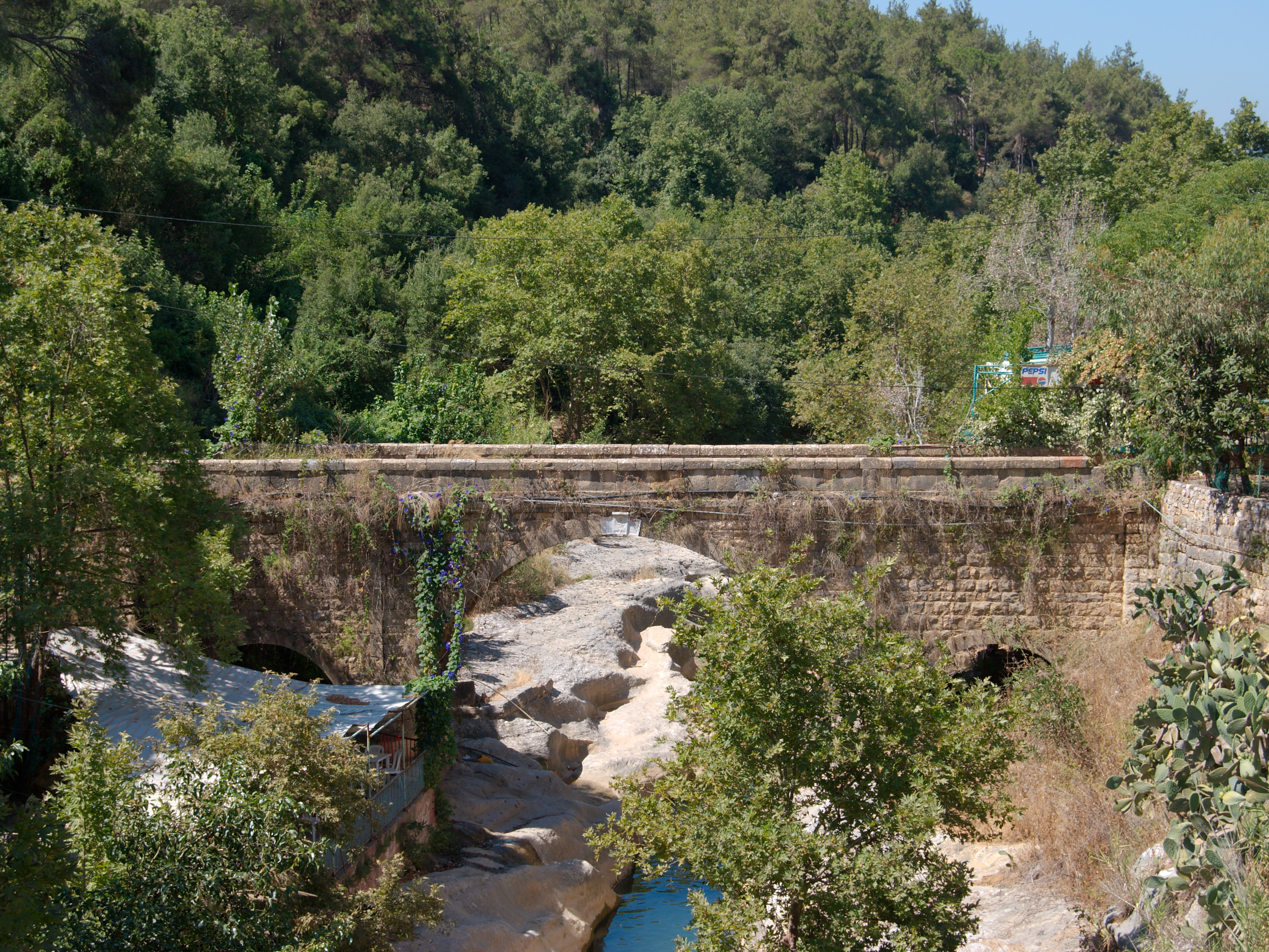
- Bridge over Nahr (river) Damour known in English as the judges bridge. Was built by Emir Zayn ad-Dine at-Tannoukhi who was judge at Ain Ksour

- Location in Lebanon
- Coordinates: 33°44′57″N 35°32′05″E
- Country: Lebanon
- Governorate: Mount Lebanon Governorate
- District: Aley District

Area
  - Total: 0.75 sq mi (1.94 km^{2})
- Elevation: 2,330 ft (710 m)
- Time zone: UTC+2 (EST)
  - Summer (DST): +3

Ain Ksour (Arabic: عين كسور, romanized: ʿAyn Ksūr), is a village in Aley District, Lebanon.

Municipal elections are held every six years.

== History ==
In 1838, Eli Smith noted the place, called 'Ain Kesur, located in El-Ghurb el-Fokany; Upper el-Ghurb.

There are two churches in Ain Ksour. One is Saint Peter and Paul's church, which was built around 800 AD, destroyed during the Lebanese civil war, and rebuilt. The other is Saint Elias's church, which is newer, was destroyed during the Lebanese civil war, and is currently being rebuilt.

== Bibliography ==
- Robinson, E.; Smith, E. (1841). Biblical Researches in Palestine, Mount Sinai and Arabia Petraea: A Journal of Travels in the year 1838. Vol. 3. Boston: Crocker & Brewster.
