= Souk El Gharb =

Souk El Gharb سوق الغرب
- City
- Location within Lebanon
- Coordinates: 33.7925°N 35.5625°E
- Country: Lebanon
- Governorate: Mount Lebanon Governorate
- District: Aley District
- Highest elevation: 750 m (2,460 ft)
- Lowest elevation: 674 m (2,211 ft)
- Time zone: UTC+2 (EET)
  - Summer (DST): UTC+3 (EEST)
- Dialing code: +961

Souk El Gharb (Arabic: سوق الغرب, romanized: Sūq al-Gharb), (also spelled Suk, Sug al, ul, Suq), is a town located in the Aley District, Mount Lebanon Governorate, in Lebanon and its name translates to "Western Market".

Before the Lebanese Civil War (1975–1990), this mountain town surrounded by pine woods was a prosperous mountain resort nestled in the mountains of the Aley District of Mount Lebanon, overlooking Saint George Bay and Beirut. Being located only a few kilometers away from the district capital of Aley, it is now considered one of Aley's suburbs. The villages that lie between Aley and Souk El Gharb are Bmakine and the two Ains (the modern spelling in Lebanese Arabic is a'ayn): Ain el-Sayydé ("Our Lady's spring"), and Ain el-Rimmané ("The spring of the pomegranate"). South of Souk El Gharb is located the village of Kaifun.

== Demographics ==
The inhabitants of Souk El Garb are predominantly Greek-Catholics and Greek-Orthodox Christians. Prior to the outbreak of the Civil War in 1975, the town, along with neighboring Aley, was a popular tourist destination for wealthy Arab outsiders from the Arab countries of the Persian Gulf, who used to own luxurious villas there where they spent the summers, escaping the heat and humidity in their own countries.

== Churches and abbeys ==
- The Saint George Greek-Catholic Abbey of Bmakine.
- The Saint George Greek-Orthodox Abbey, whose construction began in 1570 and serves as the summer residence of the Greek-Orthodox Metropolitan of Beirut.

== Schools and universities ==
Souk El Gharb was famous for housing several important schools and teaching institutions in Lebanon, including: the Souk El Gharb Presbyterian School (alumni include Abraham Rihbany), the Souk El Gharb College of Lebanon, the Souk El Gharb Technical Institute and College, the Souk el Gharb School for English Instruction, and the Souk El Gharb Boarding School for Boys. In addition to these schools, Souk El Gharb also houses the Balamand university.

== History ==
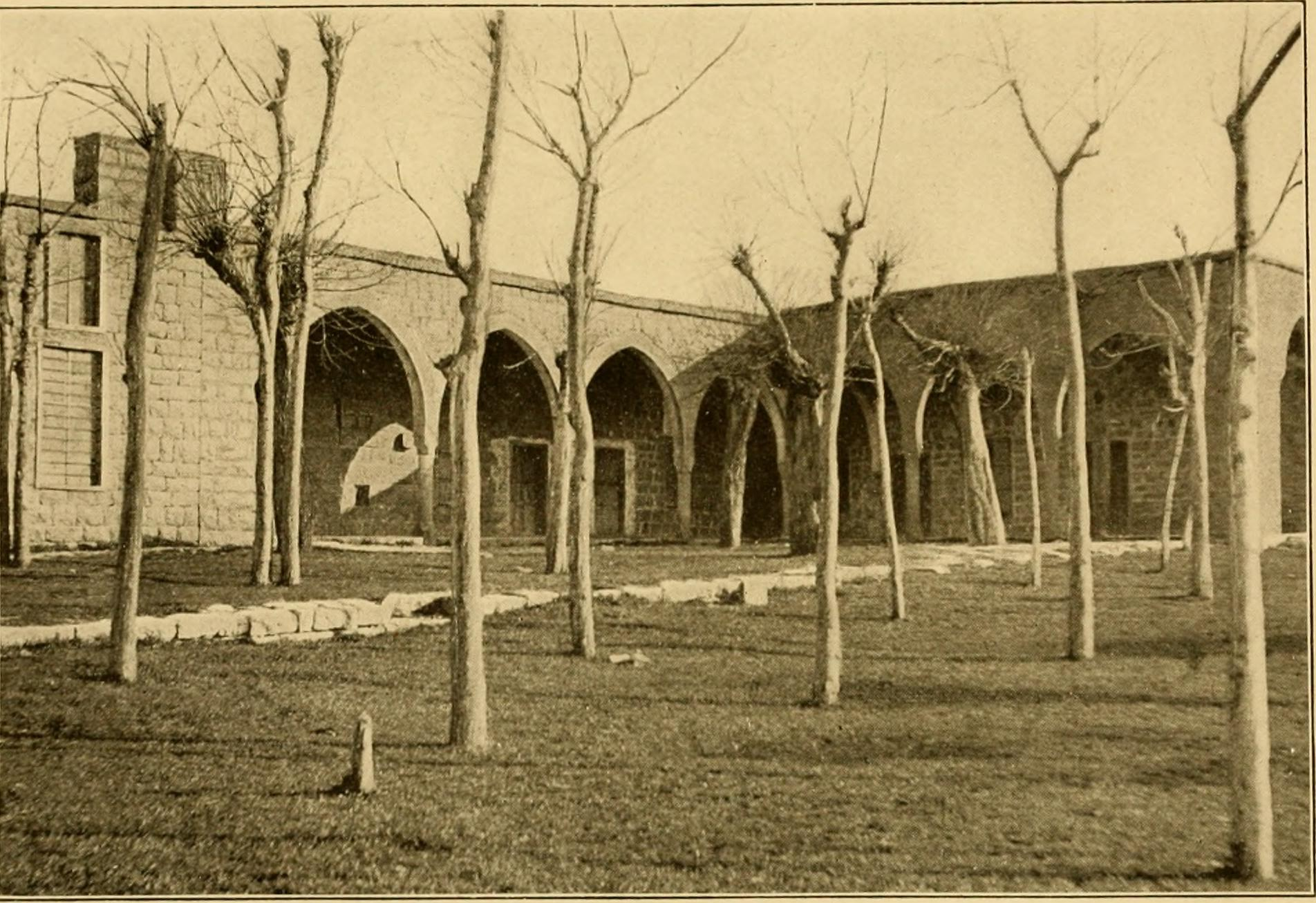
The high school of Suk-el-Gharb, Lebanon, 1914

Souk El Gharb has been inhabited since ancient times, as attested by the Roman vestiges found in the town area. Most of its historical buildings date back at least from the era of Ottoman rule in the 16th century.

The town itself was the scene of several notable fierce battles during the Lebanese Civil War, its notability arising from being actually held for a long time by the Lebanese Army rather than a particular Lebanese militia. This was sometimes achieved against great odds, by facing strong pressure from Lebanese Muslim militias backed both by Syrian Army forces stationed at Lebanon and the Palestine Liberation Organization (PLO) guerrilla factions. Between September 1983 and October 1990, General Michel Aoun's Eighth Brigade managed to repulse the Druze Progressive Socialist Party's People's Liberation Army (PLA) militia and their allies' attempts to wrestle control of the town. Unfortunately for the local civilian population, it also led to the destruction of much of their town.

On 10 August 1989 the Syrians launched a massive and sustained artillery barrage on the positions held by Lebanese Army units loyal to General Michel Aoun, followed three days later by a PSP/PLA ground offensive against their positions in Souk El Gharb overlooking the presidential palace at Baabda and the Ministry of Defence at Yarze. The assault was repulsed with 20–30 PSP/PLA men being killed.

In June 2005, parliamentary elections were held in the town for the first time since the withdrawal of Syrian Army troops from Lebanon. One resident put it in this way: "For me, ballot box battles are for sure much better than gunbattles..."

=== The Battle of Souk El Gharb in September 1983 ===
Souk El-Gharb figured prominently in the Civil War years, but during this particular timeframe the town attracted worldwide attention due to the involvement of the United States Navy in the Mountain War, whose backdrop was the Israeli invasion of Lebanon in June 1982. On August 31, 1983, the Israel Defense Forces (IDF) unilaterally withdrew from the Chouf District located southeast of Beirut, thus removing the buffer between the Druze PLA and the Christian Maronite Lebanese Forces (LF) militias and triggered another round of brutal fighting. By September, the Druze PSP/PLA had defeated the LF in a series of engagements and gained control over most of the Chouf. In later stages of the battle, the Lebanese Army loyal to President Amin Gemayel's government relieved the LF and took over the positions that they had held onto in Chouf.

Baabda lay downhill on the Beirut–Aley–Damascus highway, and any militia forces advancing from the south had to pass through Souk El Gharb in order to get into the Beirut–Aley road. Moreover, Souk El Gharb controlled a ridge that overlooked the key East Beirut districts of Baabda and Yarze, where were located the Presidential Palace and the Lebanese Ministry of Defense complex, respectively. From that ridge, Druze PLA artillery units had a point-blank light of sight to those areas.

The Lebanese Army Commander-in-Chief, Lieutenant general Ibrahim Tannous, tried to get the Americans involved, reasoning with them that they should do so, since the Syrians were backing the anti-government militias. At first, the Americans refused but eventually agreed when they were told that Souk El Gharb was in danger of being overrun. The nuclear-powered missile cruiser USS Virginia, and the destroyer USS John Rodgers, the frigate USS Bowen, and the destroyer USS Arthur W. Radford fired 338 rounds from their five-inch (127 mm) naval guns in support of the Lebanese Army units defending Souk El Gharb. Eventually, the Lebanese Army's Eighth Brigade bore the brunt of the attacks, but succeeded in retaining control of the town after three days of heavy fighting. However, it remains an open question whether they would have held it without the American naval support. Much of the town was left in ruins during these hostilities. The PLA seized Souk El Gharb three times over, but failed at each occasion to keep it for long: firstly in September 1983, because of the American naval bombardments; secondly in March 1984, after U.S. troops left Lebanon and because of internal political pressure brought to bear on the PSP/PLA to withdraw from Souk El Gharb; and thirdly in 1987, after the PLA temporarily took control of the area, a quarrel between Druze troops allowed the Lebanese Army's Fifth Brigade to retake the town, which they held until October 13, 1990, when it fell to an alliance of Druze PSP/PLA, Christian Lebanese Forces – Executive Command (LFEC) and Syrian Social Nationalist Party (SSNP) militias and Syrian Army troops.

Some authors, including Thomas Friedman, have argued that the use of the naval bombardments was the turning point in which the U.S. military forces of the Multinational Force in Lebanon (MNF) contingent began to be perceived as active participants in the ongoing civil war rather than neutral peacekeepers, which made them vulnerable to retaliation.

Much use was made of landmines in the vicinity of the town and demining is an ongoing concern. One strategic position known as Hill 888, overlooking the Beirut International Airport was extensively mined.

== See also ==
- Dhour El Choueir
- Khalde
- Lebanese Civil War
- Mountain War (Lebanon)
- People's Liberation Army (Lebanon)
- 1983 Beirut barracks bombing
