= Chevrolet C/K (second generation) =

American truck series by General Motors

Second generation
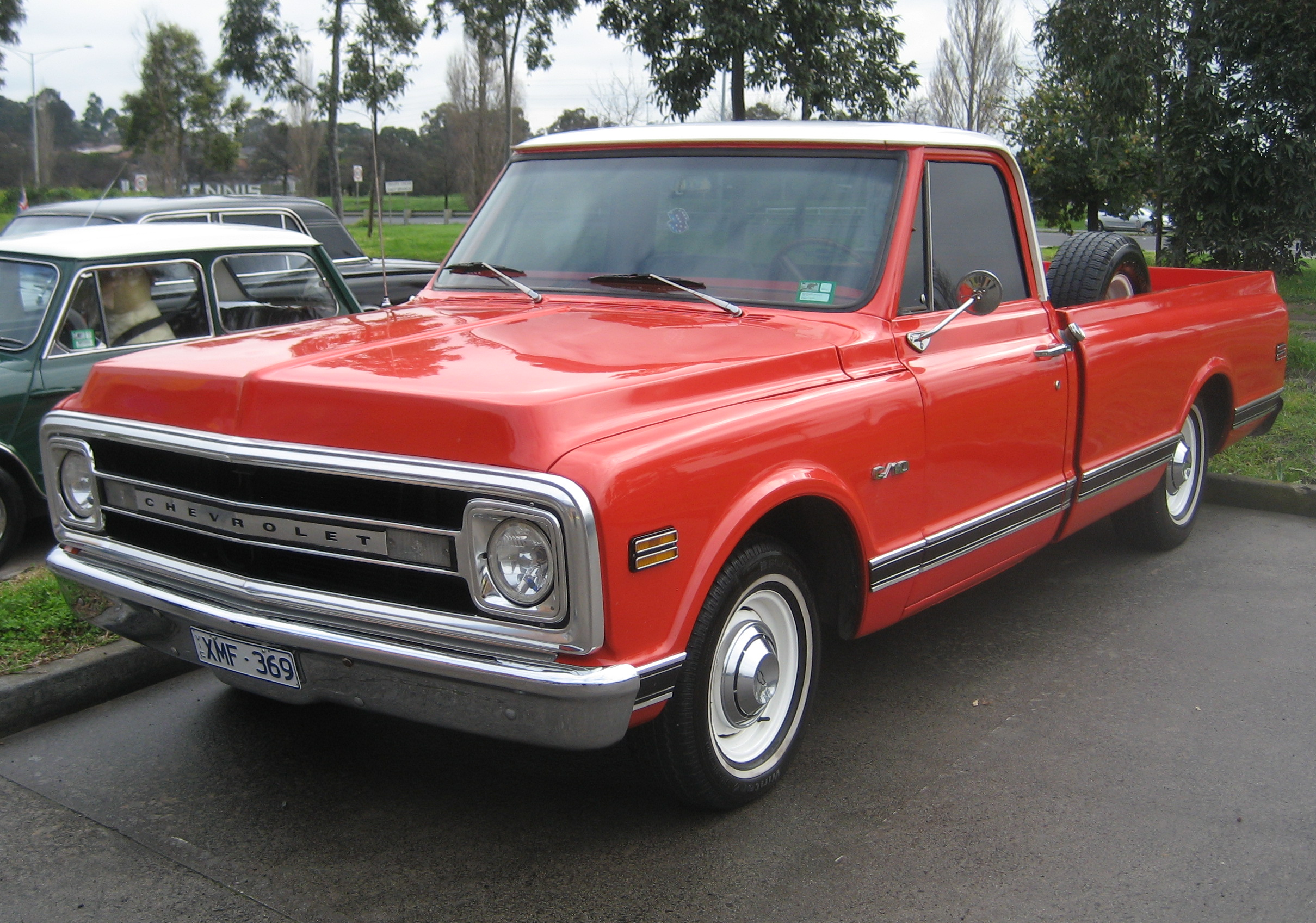
- 1970 Chevrolet C10 Fleetside

Overview
- Manufacturer: General Motors
- Model years: 1967–1972
- Assembly: United States: Baltimore Assembly, Baltimore, Maryland; Flint Truck Assembly, Flint, Michigan; Fremont Assembly, Fremont, California; Janesville Assembly, Janesville, Wisconsin; Lakewood Assembly, Lakewood Heights, Atlanta, Georgia; Pontiac West Assembly, Pontiac, Michigan; St. Louis Truck Assembly, St. Louis, Missouri; North Tarrytown Assembly, North Tarrytown, New York; Canada: Oshawa Truck Assembly, Oshawa, Ontario; Argentina: San Martín, Buenos Aires; Chile: Arica
- Designer: Bill Mitchell

Body and chassis
- Body style: 2-door pickup truck 2-door chassis cab truck
- Platform: GM C/K (Action Line)
- Related: Chevrolet Blazer/GMC Jimmy; Chevrolet Suburban/GMC Carryall

Powertrain
- Engine: 250 cu in (4.1 L) High Torque I6; 292 cu in (4.8 L) High Torque I6; 283 cu in (4.6 L) Small-Block V8; 305 cu in (5.0 L) GMC 60-degree V6; 307 cu in (5.0 L) Small-Block V8; 327 cu in (5.4 L) Small-Block V8; 350 cu in (5.7 L) Small-Block V8; 351 cu in (5.8 L) GMC 60-degree V6; 396 cu in (6.5 L) Big-Block V8; 402 cu in (6.6 L) Big-Block V8
- Transmission: 3-speed manual 4-speed Muncie SM420 manual 4-speed Muncie SM465 manual 4-speed New Process NP435 manual 2-speed Powerglide automatic 3-speed THM-350 automatic 3-speed THM-400 automatic

Dimensions
- Wheelbase: 115 in (2,921 mm) (short box); 127 in (3,226 mm) (long box); 133 in (3,378 mm) (Longhorn)
- Length: 188.5 in (4,788 mm) (short box); 207.75 in (5,277 mm) (long box); 213.75 in (5,429 mm) (Longhorn Fleetside); 217.75 in (5,531 mm) (Longhorn Stepside)

Chronology
- Predecessor: Chevrolet/GMC C/K (first generation)
- Successor: C/K (Rounded Line)

The second generation of the C/K series is a range of trucks that was manufactured by General Motors. Marketed by both the Chevrolet and GMC divisions from the 1967 to 1972 model years, this generation was given the "Action Line" moniker by General Motors (the first-generation C/K did not receive such a name). As with its predecessor, the second generation C/K included full-size pickup trucks, chassis cab trucks, and medium-duty commercial trucks.

The Action Line C/K marked the expansion of the General Motors utility vehicle range, as the Chevrolet Suburban (GMC Carryall) utility wagon was joined by the Chevrolet K5 Blazer (GMC Jimmy) off-road vehicle. A shorter-wheelbase version of the K-series pickup truck, the open-top Blazer/Jimmy was among the first widely produced sport-utility vehicles. This generation marked the debut of the Chevrolet Cheyenne and GMC Sierra nameplates; making their debuts as trim levels, the Cheyenne and Sierra are both used by GM to this day in current production.

Produced by multiple sites across the United States and Canada, the model line was also produced in South America.

== Model history ==
The second-generation C/K was produced from the 1967 to the 1972 model years. Alongside multiple updates resulting from changes in federal regulations, the Action-Line trucks underwent a mid-cycle revision for the 1971 model year.

=== 1967–1970 ===
For 1967, the C/K series underwent a ground-up redesign as GM better adapted the model line towards multi-purpose use; along with improving durability and capability, comfort and convenience features were also increased to improve its effectiveness as a personal-use vehicle. For the pickup trucks, this was the final year of two rear window sizes available, including a small rear window (standard, shared with medium-duty trucks) and wider "full-view" window (optional for pickup trucks and chassis cabs).

For 1968, Chevrolet celebrated its 50th year as a truck manufacturer; to commemorate the anniversary, a 50th Anniversary Package (featuring an exclusive white-gold-white paint scheme) was offered as an option. On all pickup trucks, the larger "full-view" rear window became standard (with the smaller design remaining on medium-duty trucks). Following their requirement by the U.S. government, side-marker lights were added to all four corners. In a minor revision, GMC shifted its emblem from the grille to the hood. On 3/4-ton C-series trucks, GM introduced the Longhorn option, including an 8 1/2-foot Fleetside/Wideside pickup bed.

For 1969, the interior underwent some component changes, adopting a foot-operated parking brake and a redesigned steering wheel; a two-spoke design (with a plastic horn button) replaced the previous three-spoke design (with a chrome horn button). On the exterior, the hood was redesigned with a blunter front end; Chevrolet trucks received a redesigned grille. Upper and lower side moldings were introduced alongside additional two-tone paint configurations; standard on CST-trim (GMC Super Custom) trucks, the side moldings were optional on any other trim levels. GMC introduced the Sierra and Sierra Grande option packages, making them distinct trim levels for 1972.

For 1970, Action-Line trucks saw little change, with the Chevrolet grille receiving a minor revision.

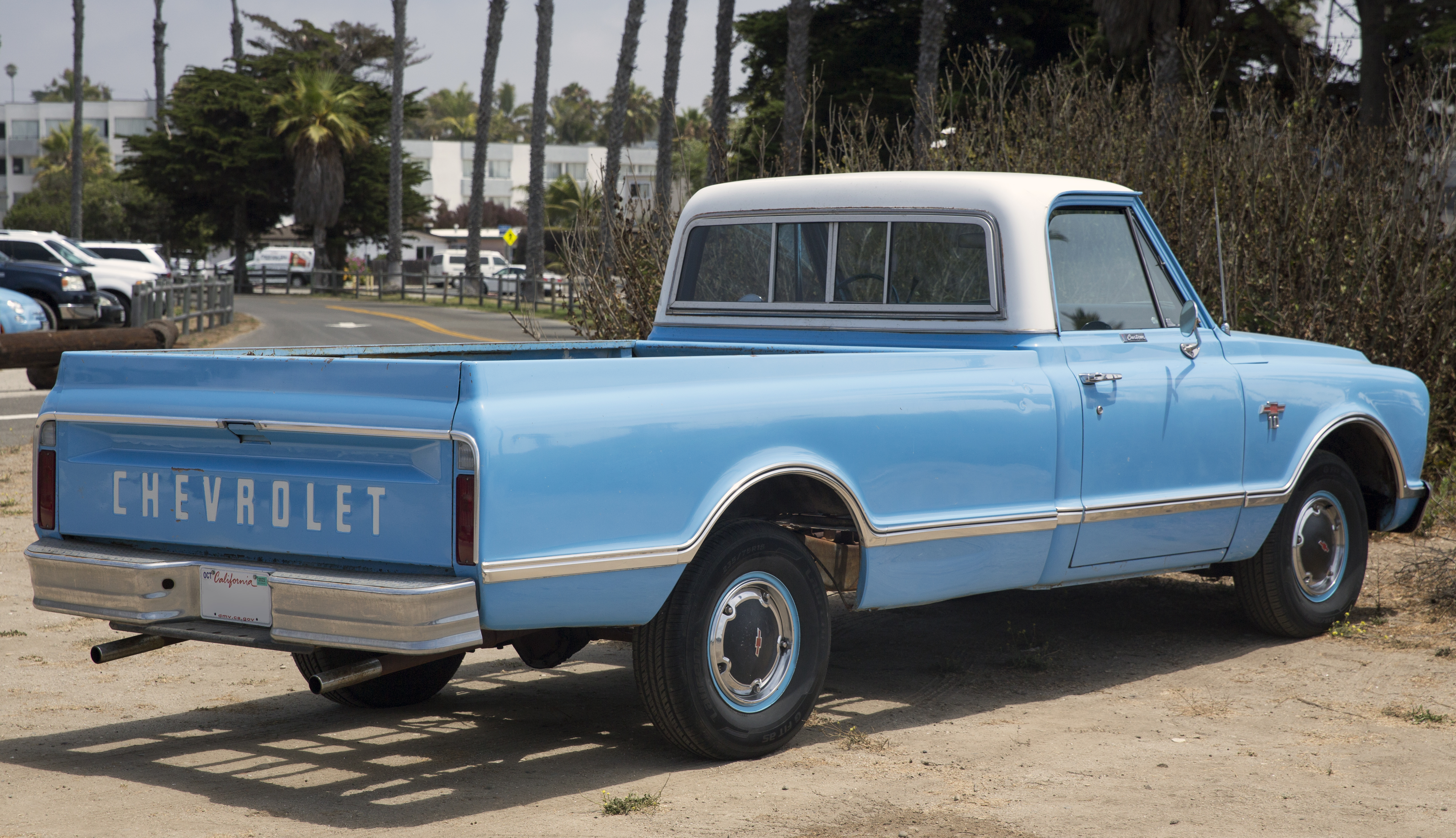
1967 Chevrolet C10 Custom; rear view

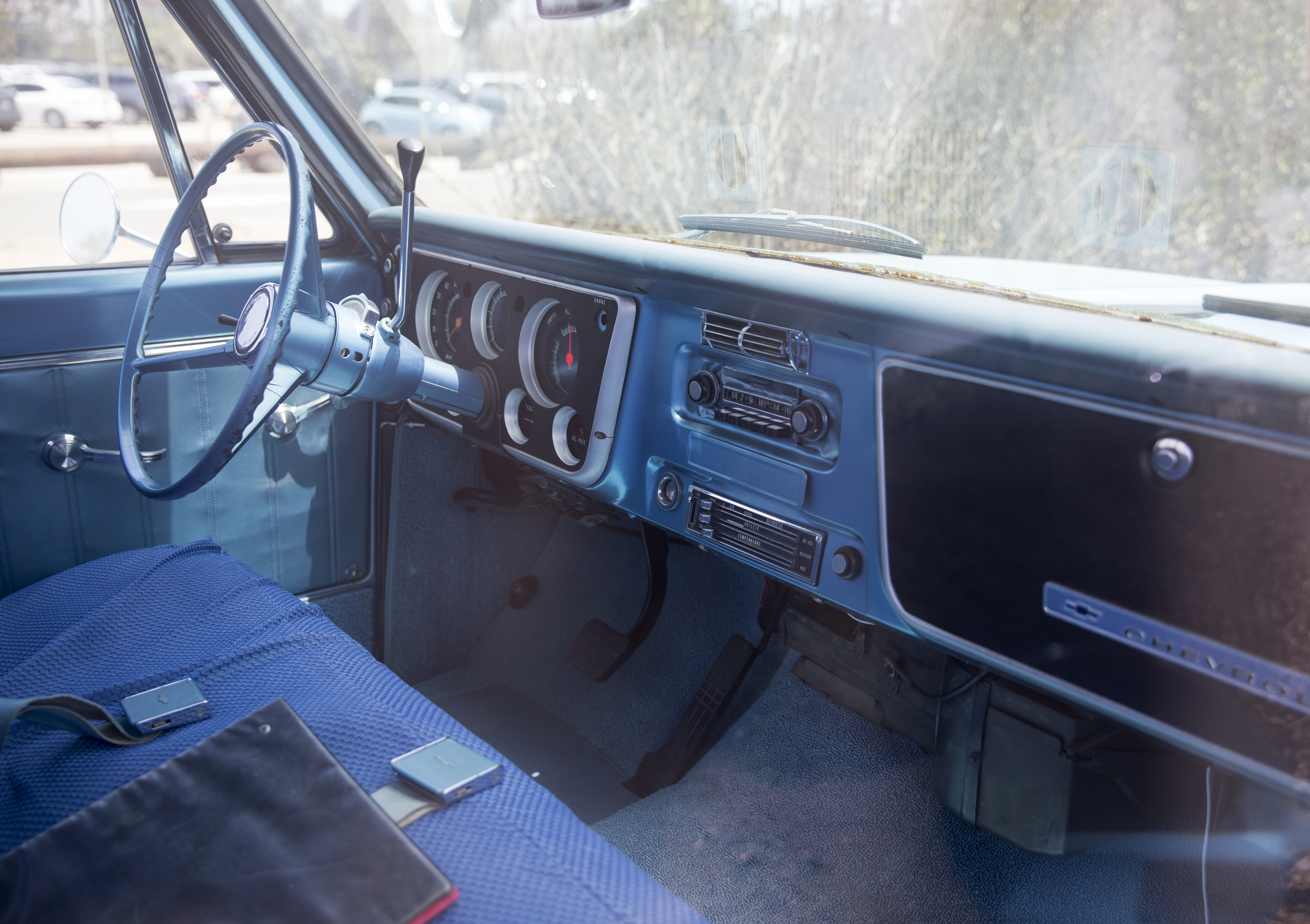
1967 Chevrolet C10 interior

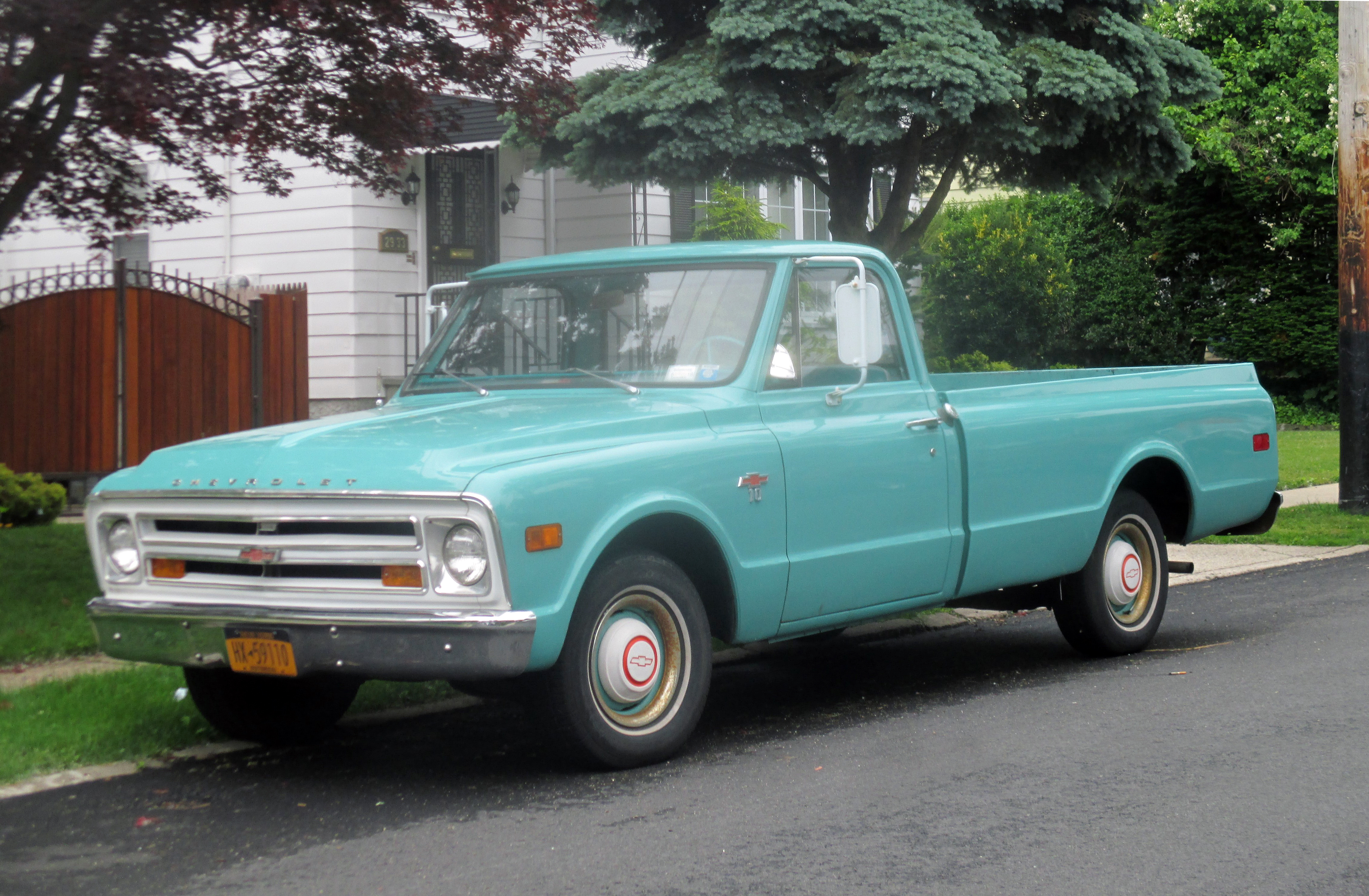
1968 Chevrolet C10

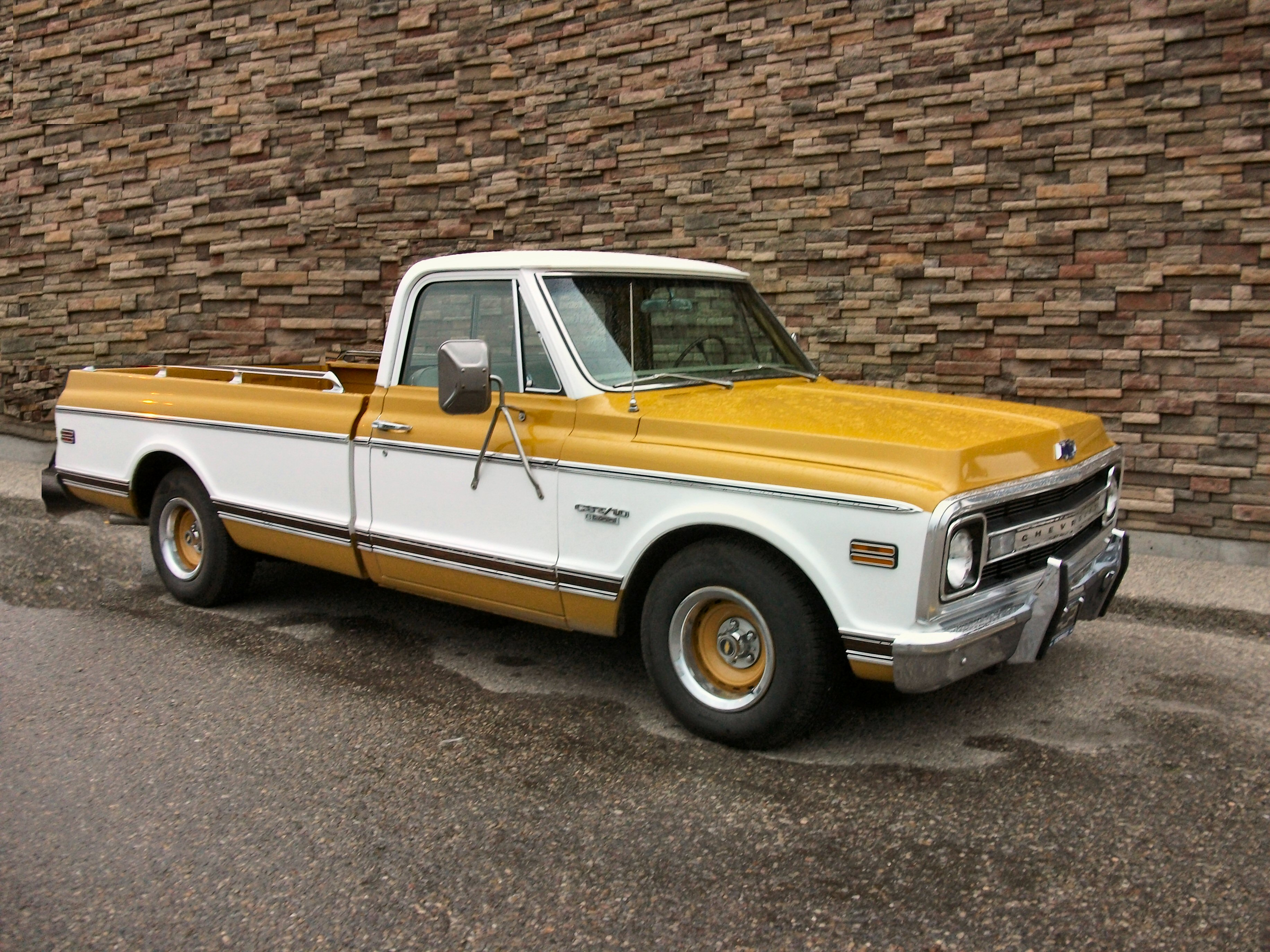
1970 Chevrolet C10 CST

=== 1971 model update ===
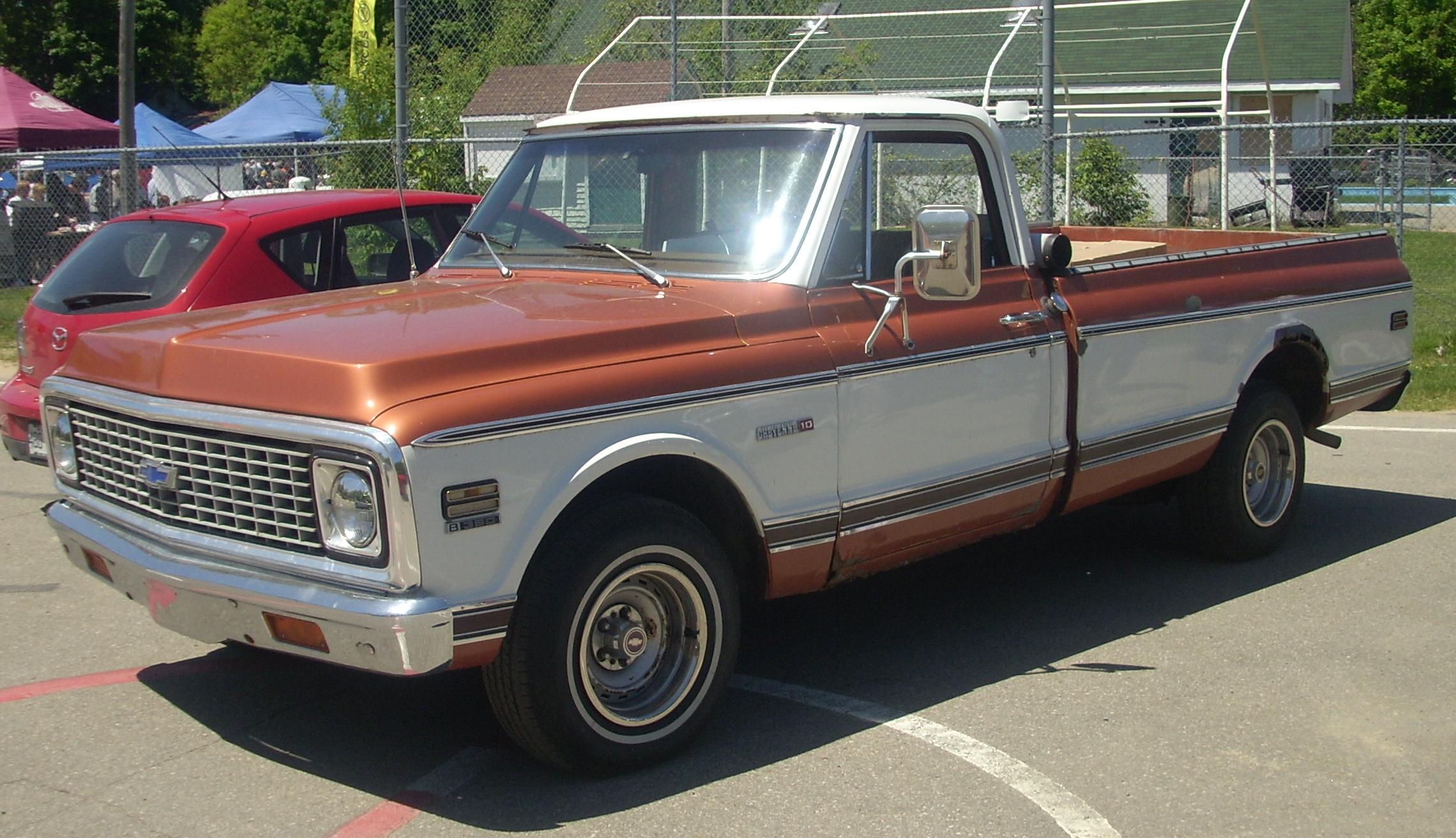
1972 Chevrolet C10 Cheyenne

For the 1971 model year, the Action-Line C/K underwent a mid-cycle revision, distinguished by updated front fascias for both Chevrolet and GMC pickup trucks. Chevrolets received an eggcrate grille design (with the Chevrolet bowtie emblem returning to the grille); GMC grilles shared the stamping as before, styled with additional blacked-out trim. In a chassis upgrade, all light-duty C/K trucks received front disc brakes as standard equipment. The interior underwent upgrades, introducing an optional tilt steering column for the automatic and 4-speed manual transmissions. Following its usage in Chevrolet cars for several years, the C/K offered an AM/FM radio as a factory-installed option for the first time.

For 1972, the interior underwent minor revisions, introducing molded-plastic door panels with integral armrests (requiring updated door handles and window cranks). In another change, a rear-view mirror glued to the windshield replaced the previous version, which was bolted to the headliner.

== Model overview ==
The second-generation C/K series was marketed by both the Chevrolet and GMC divisions. Marketed primarily as pickup trucks, the model line was also offered as chassis cab vehicles without a pickup truck bed; the latter formed the basis of a wide variety of vehicles, ranging from stake trucks, commercial vehicles, and recreational vehicles (RVs).

The Action-Line pickup trucks were sold in ^{1}/_{2}-ton, ^{3}/_{4}-ton, and 1-ton (nominal) payload series, including two bed configurations and three wheelbase lengths; this was the final generation sold only with a two-door cab.

=== Chassis ===
The Action-Line pickup trucks shared a similar chassis configuration as the 1960-1966 C/K, using a drop-center ladder frame. Pickup trucks were offered in three wheelbases: 115 inches, 127 inches, and 133 inches (shared by Stepside and Longhorn pickups); chassis cab trucks were also offered in a 157-inch wheelbase.

Initially produced with drum brakes on all four wheels, the model line adopted front disc brakes for 1971.

==== Suspension ====
For 1/2-ton and 3/4-ton C-series trucks (two-wheel drive), the independent front suspension design of the first generation was largely carried over from 1963 to 1966, using upper and lower control arms with coil springs. K-series 4x4 trucks for both division were leaf-sprung on both front and rear axles, including a live front axle.

Two different rear suspension configurations were used, dependent on specification and payload series. On 1/2-ton and 3/4-ton trucks, Chevrolet equipped a live rear axle with two coil-sprung trailing arms; along with auxiliary rear leaf springs, a rear leaf-spring suspension was an option. GMC pickup trucks of the same payload series offered rear leaf springs as standard, with rear coil springs as optional equipment (the opposite of Chevrolet). On all one-ton trucks, the rear axle was leaf-sprung.

==== Powertrain ====
For its 1967 launch, the Action-Line trucks carried over the four-engine range from the 1966 C/K series. Two inline-sixes were offered, with Chevrolet 250 cubic-inch and 292 cubic-inch engines offered. Two Chevrolet small-block V8s were offered, including 283 and 327 cubic-inch engines. GMC additionally offered divisionally-produced V6 engines for its C/K trucks (305 and 351 cubic inches) alongside the four Chevrolet engines.

For 1968, Chevrolet enlarged the 283 V8 to 307 cubic inches. A 396 cubic-inch V8 became an option (the first time a large-block V8 was offered in a light-duty GM truck). For 1969, Chevrolet enlarged the 327 V8 to 350 cubic inches.

For 1970, GMC phased its V6 engines out of light trucks, switching entirely to Chevrolet-produced engines.

For 1971, the 396 underwent internal revisions and was enlarged to 402 cubic inches. In line with its use in full-size Chevrolet cars, the 402 was labeled as 400 cubic inches.

Through its 1967-1972 production, engines were paired to a variety of transmissions. A three-speed column-shifted manual was standard; on 1/2-ton trucks, a three-speed overdrive was offered as an option, alongside several four-speed manuals. The 2-speed Powerglide automatic was offered as an option, alongside the Turbo-Hydramatic 350 and 400 3-speed automatic transmissions.

1967-1972 C/K pickup truck powertrain details
Engine	Engine family	Production	Fuel system	Output (gross)		Notes
Engine	Engine family	Production	Fuel system	Horsepower	Torque	Notes
250 cu in (4.1 L) I6	Chevrolet High Torque engine	1967-1972	1-bbl	155 hp @ 4200 RPM	235 lb-ft @ 1600 RPM	Known as "Turbo-Thrift" in passenger car installations
283 cu in (4.6 L) V8	Chevrolet small-block engine	1967		175 hp @ 4400 RPM	275 lb-ft @ 2400 RPM	
292 cu in (4.8 L) I6	Chevrolet High Torque engine	1967-1972	1-bbl	170 hp @ 4000 RPM	275 lb-ft @ 1600 RPM	
305 cu in (5.0 L) V6	GMC V6 engine	1967-1969	1-bbl	165 hp @ 3600 RPM	280 lb-ft @ 1600 RPM	305E
307 cu in (5.0 L) V8	Chevrolet small-block engine	1968-1972		200 hp @ 4400 RPM	300 lb-ft @ 2400 RPM	
327 cu in (5.4 L) V8	Chevrolet small-block engine	1967-1968		220 hp @ 4400 RPM	320 lb-ft @ 2800 RPM	
350 cu in (5.7 L) V8	Chevrolet small-block engine	1969-1972	4-bbl	250 hp @ 4600 RPM	350 lb-ft @ 3000 RPM	RPO code LS9
351 cu in (5.8 L) V6	GMC V6 engine	1967-1969	1-bbl			351E
396 cu in (6.5 L) V8	Chevrolet big-block engine (Mark IV)	1968-1970	4-bbl	325 hp @ 4800 RPM	410 lb-ft @ 3200 RPM	
402 cu in (6.6 L) V8	Chevrolet big-block engine (Mark IV)	1971-1972	4-bbl	300 hp @ 4800 RPM	340 lb-ft @ 3200 RPM	Marketed as 400 cubic inches; same as "Turbo-Jet 400" in full-size Chevrolet

=== Body design ===
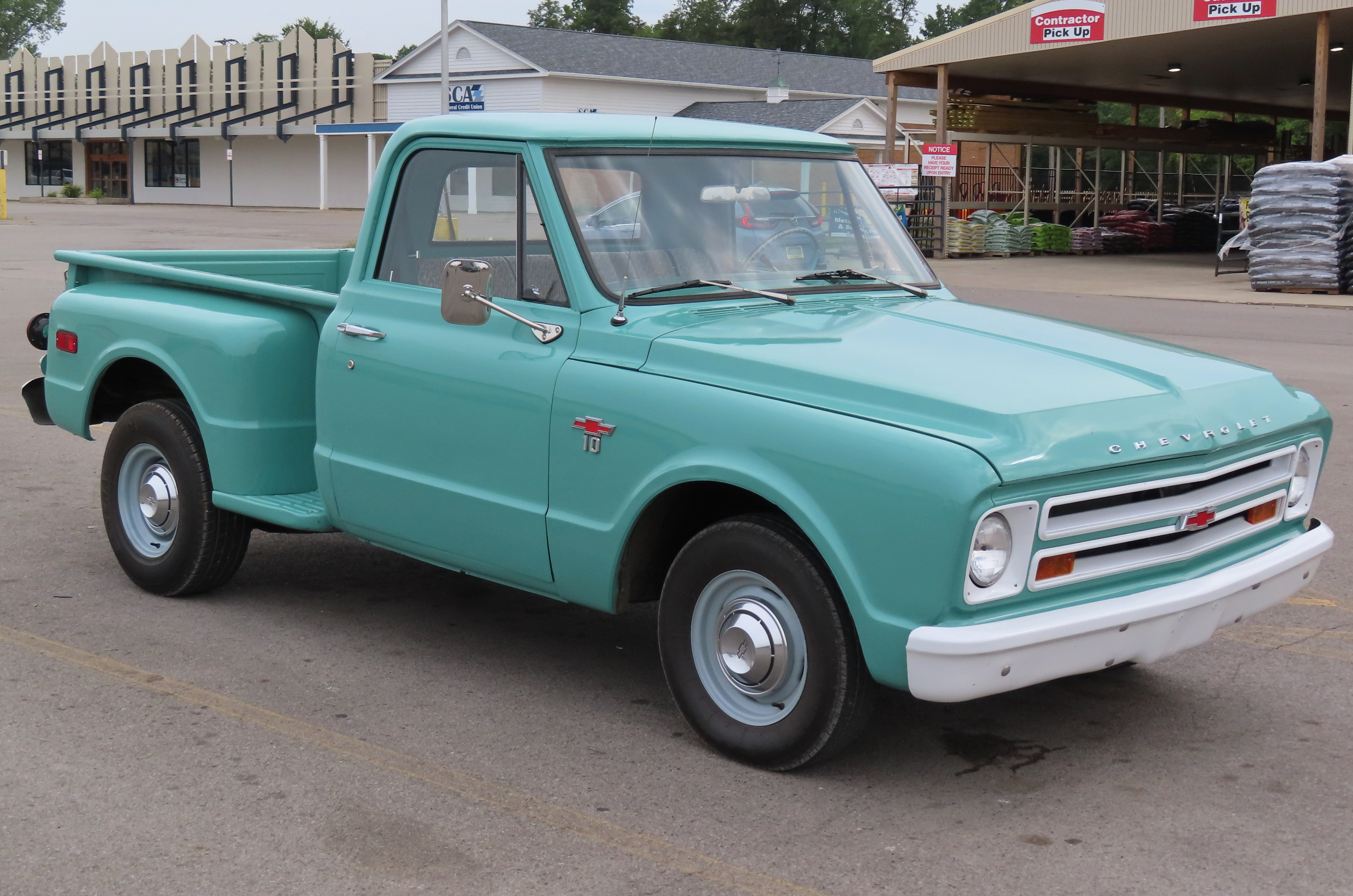
1967 C10, showing stepside bed

The Action-Line C/K trucks were offered solely in a two-door cab configuration from the factory; the model line would become the final generation C/K offered without a factory-produced crew cab. The model line was offered with two bed configurations; alongside the fenderless Chevrolet Fleetside (GMC Wideside), the bed was also offered with rear fenders as the Chevrolet Stepside (GMC Fenderside).

The pickup bed was offered in four different lengths; 6 1/2 feet and 8 feet were shared by both configurations, with 9 feet exclusive to the Stepside; the 8 1/2 feet Longhorn truck combined the 133-inch wheelbase of the 9-foot Stepside with a Fleetside (Wideside) bed.

=== Trim ===
For both Chevrolet and GMC, model nomenclature was largely carried over from the previous generation, with C-series denoting two-wheel drive trucks and K-series denoting 4x4 vehicles (specifically, "C" stood for Conventional-cab truck on light and medium-duty chassis). To denote (nominal) payload ratings, 1/2-ton, 3/4-ton, and 1-ton Chevrolet trucks were again marketed in 10, 20, and 30-series; GMC trucks were branded in 1500, 2500, and 3500 series, respectively.

For the first time since 1961, Chevrolet and GMC offered trim line designations in addition to payload series. In 1972, the Chevrolet Cheyenne and GMC Sierra trims were introduced; the nameplates still remain in use by GM in current production.

==== Chevrolet ====
For 1967, the Chevrolet Action-Line pickup trucks were offered in three trim levels. Alongside an unnamed base trim, an upgraded Custom was offered, with the CST (Custom Sport Truck) serving as the top-of-the-line trim; the trim nomenclature was used through the 1970 model year. For the 1971 model year, the base trim was renamed Custom, with the Custom becoming the Custom Deluxe; the CST was renamed as the Cheyenne trim level.

A 1969 addition was the Custom Comfort and Convenience interior package that fell between the Standard cab and CST cab options. As a running change during the 1971 model year, the Cheyenne Super was added as a fourth trim level above the standard Cheyenne; the Cheyenne Super included woodgrain dashboard trim, full instrumentation, and model-specific interior trim.

==== GMC ====
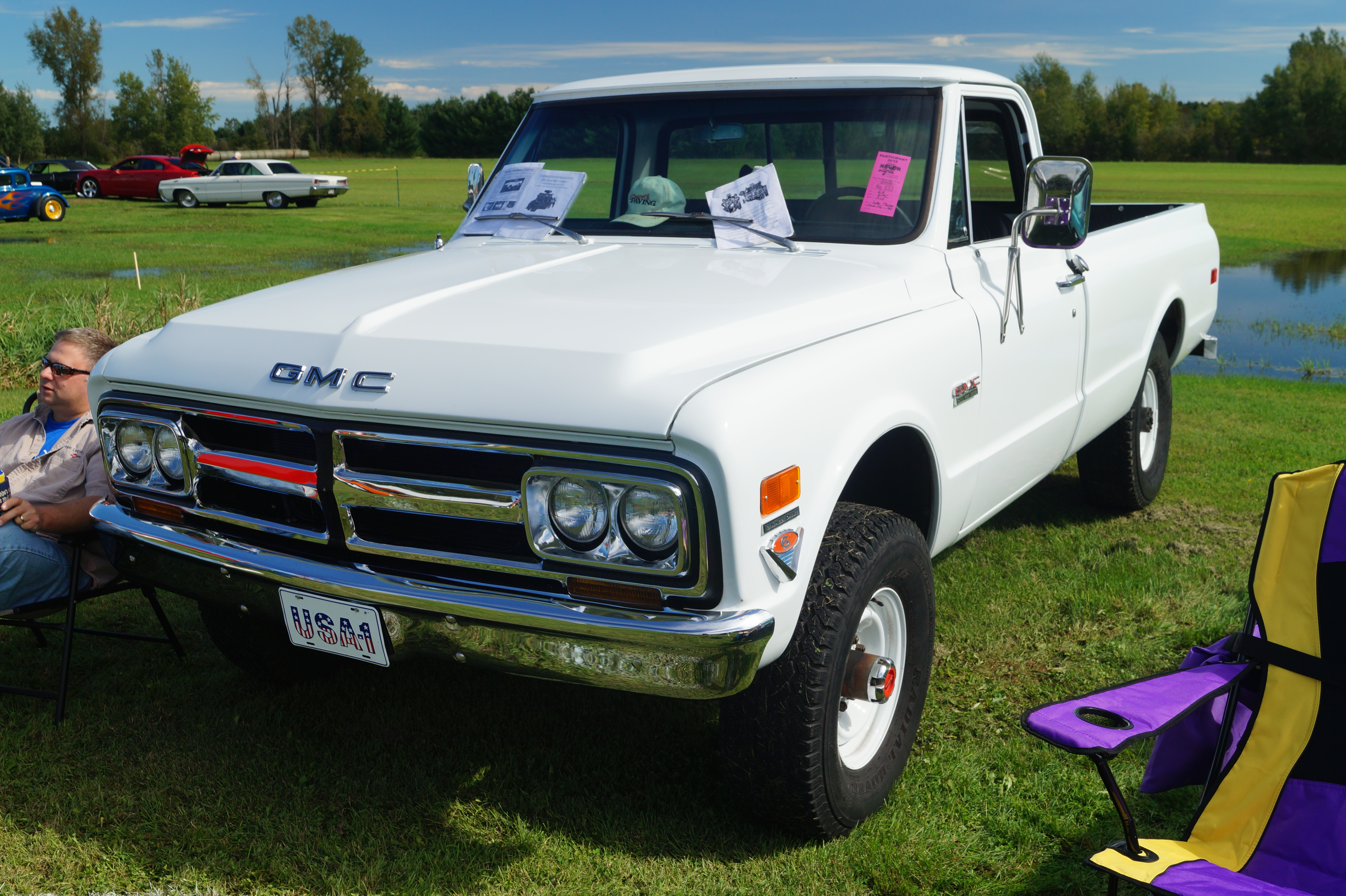
1968 GMC K2500 Super Custom

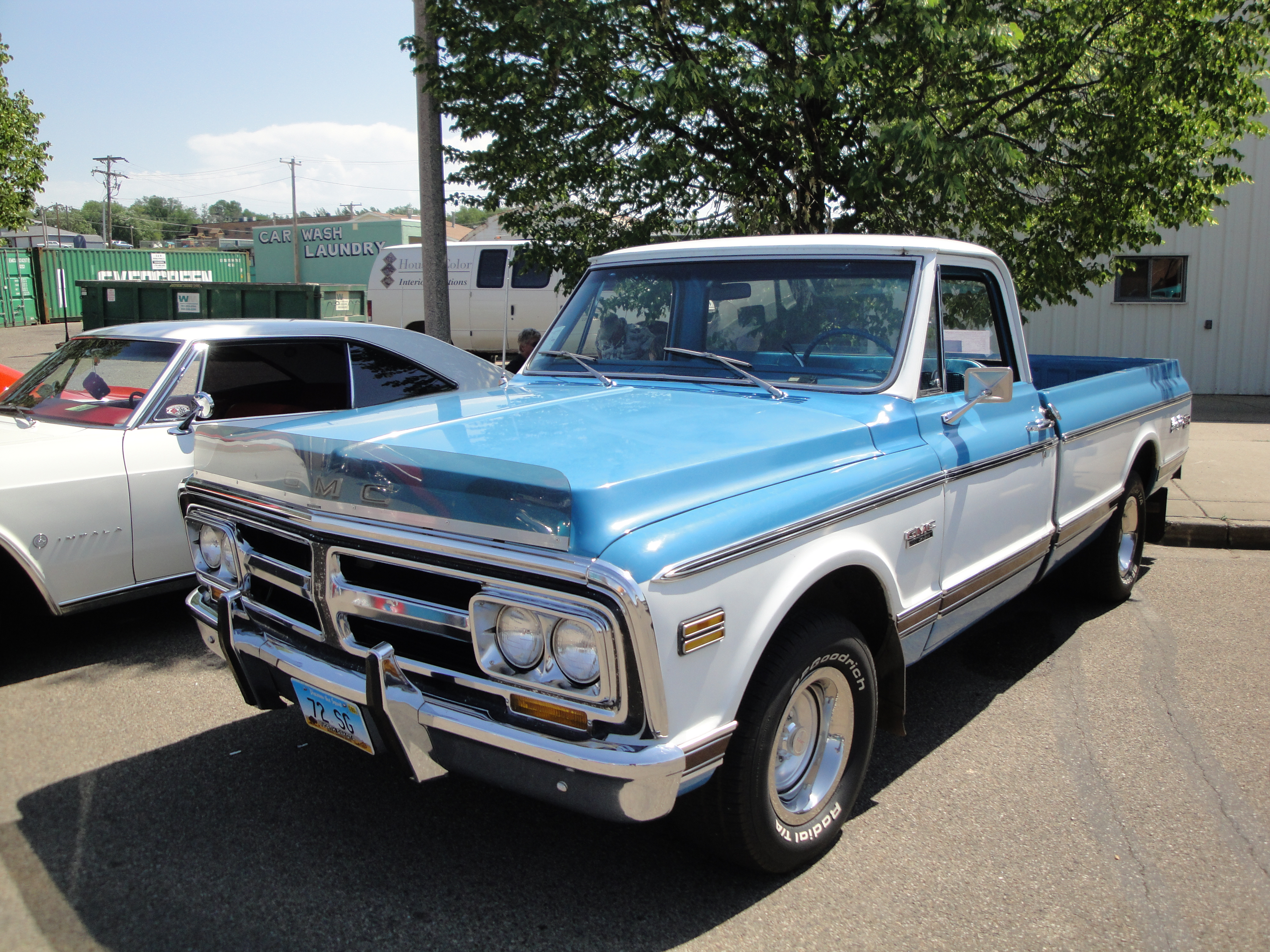
1972 GMC C1500 Sierra Grande

From 1967 to 1971, GMC Action-Line pickup trucks were offered in three trim lines. Deluxe served as a standard trim, an upgraded Custom trim was offered, with Super Custom serving as top-of-the-line trim.

For 1972, the trim line underwent a revision and was expanded from three to four. Custom replaced Deluxe as the standard trim, with Super Custom becoming the upgrade trim. Introduced as the counterpart of the Chevrolet Cheyenne and Cheyenne Super, the GMC Sierra and Sierra Grande served as the top two GMC C/K trims. In both series, the 'Highlander package' included special color-coordinated houndstooth cloth inserts and additional trim colors and insulation.

== Variants ==
=== Utility vehicles ===
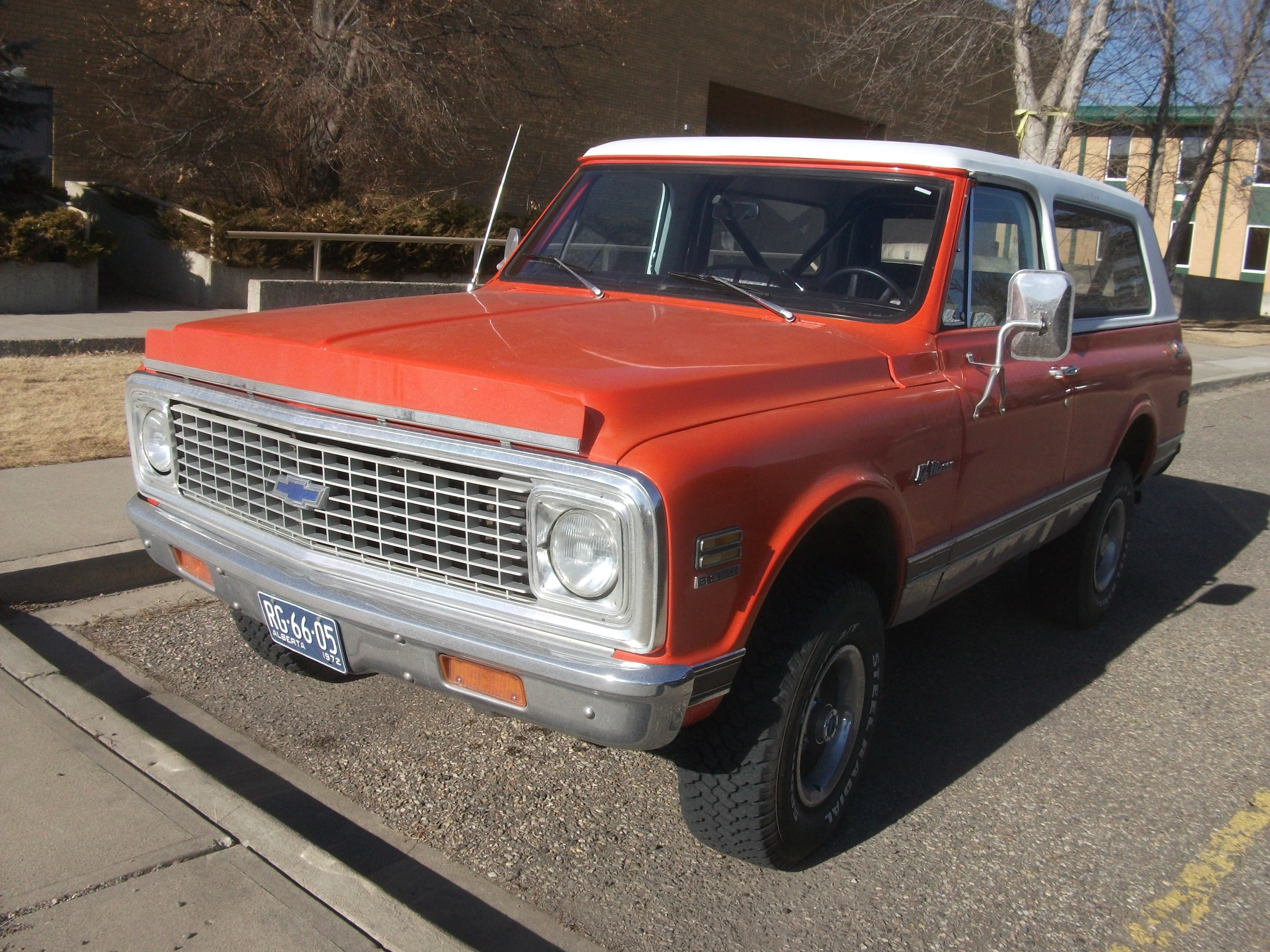
1972 Chevrolet K5 Blazer (top installed)

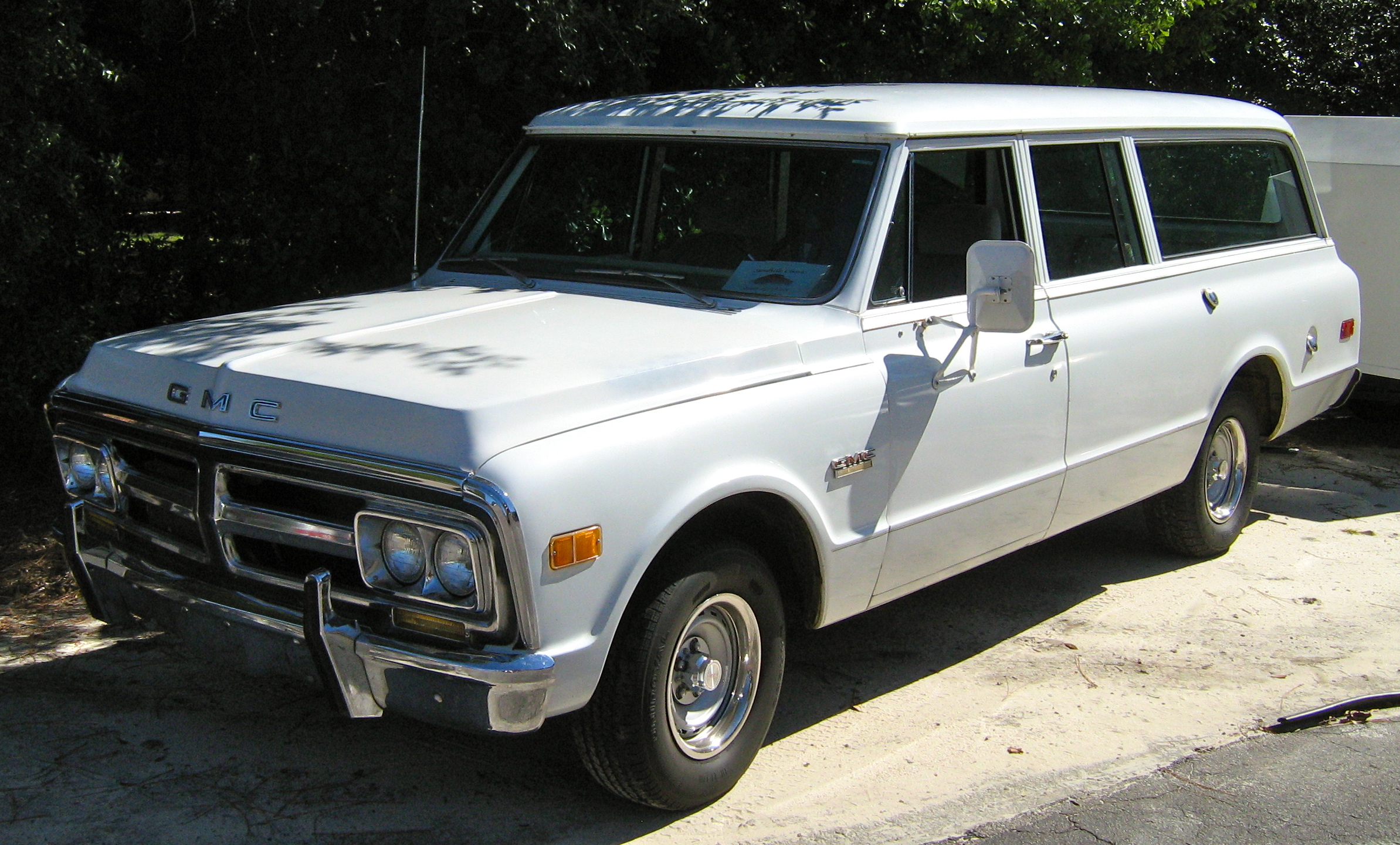
1972 GMC Carryall (Chevrolet Suburban)

The Action-Line C/K chassis served as the basis for the sixth-generation Chevrolet Suburban/GMC Carryall. In line with its Jeep Wagoneer and International Travelall competitors, the Suburban received a rear passenger door (only on the passenger side); for the first time, the model line was also offered in a 3/4-ton payload series. In line with the pickup trucks, the Suburban/Carryall was offered in both rear-wheel drive and four-wheel drive. After the 1970 model year, GM discontinued the panel van configuration of the Suburban, functionally replaced by the 1971 introduction of the G-Series Chevrolet Van/GMC Vandura. However, the side-hinged rear panel doors would remain a notable design feature of the Suburban for three further generations (lasting through 2005).

For 1969, GM introduced the Chevrolet K5 Blazer and GMC Jimmy utility vehicles. Derived from the 1/2-ton K-series, the Blazer/Jimmy was an open-top vehicle competing against the Ford Bronco and International Scout. The Blazer/Jimmy was offered in three configurations; alongside the standard open-top configuration, the model line was offered with either a convertible soft-top or a lift-off hardtop for weather protection. While larger than its competitors, the use of the pickup truck chassis offered the advantage of lowered production costs and shared components, as the 1974 Dodge Ramcharger and the 1978 Ford Bronco adopted a similar configuration.

=== Medium-duty trucks ===
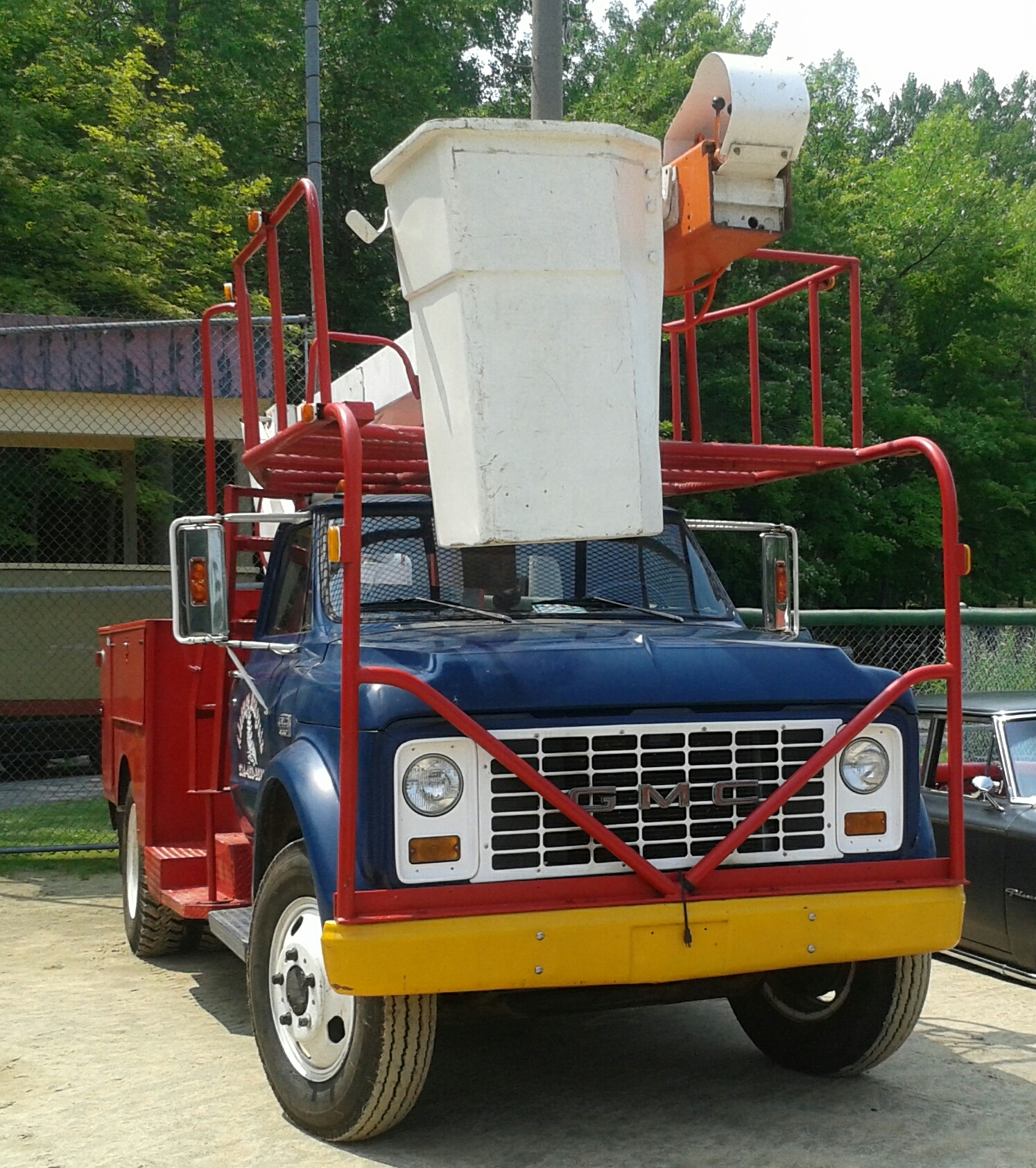
1968-1972 GMC C4500 bucket truck

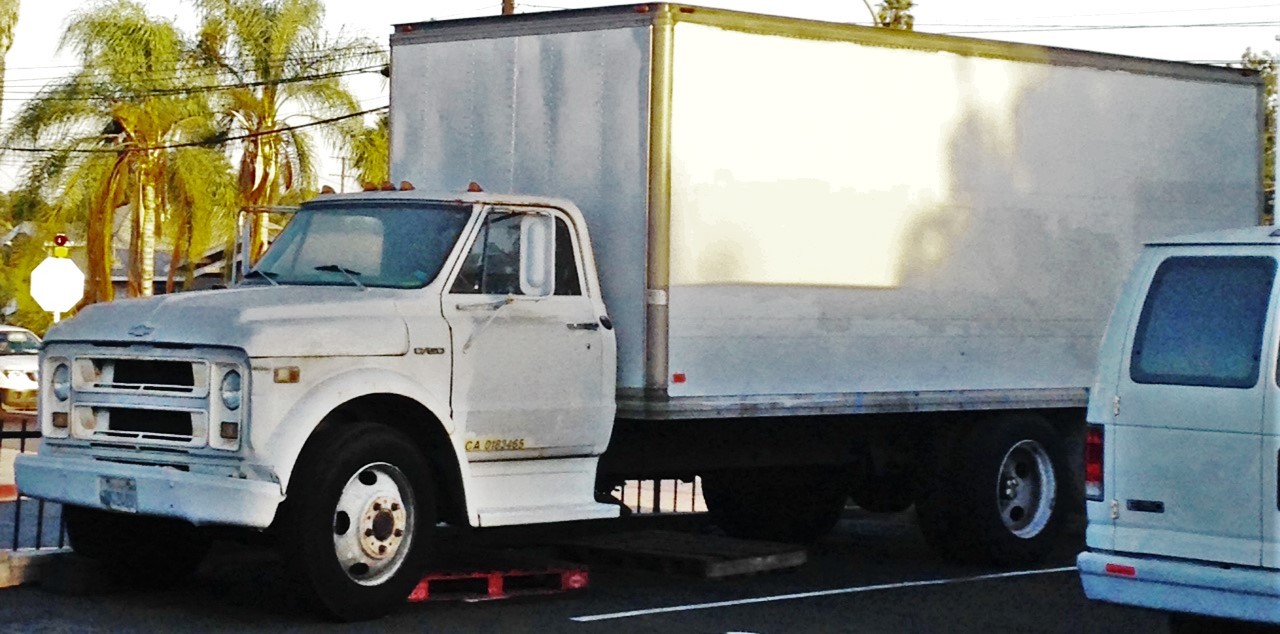
1968-1972 Chevrolet C50 with van body

Above the 1-ton 30/3500 model ranges, the C-series truck (C=Conventional) served as a basis for medium-duty conventional trucks marketed by both Chevrolet and GMC. The model range was produced under three series: the 1 1/2-ton C40 (GMC C4500) and two 2-ton trucks; the "light" C50 (GMC C5500) and "heavy" C60 (GMC C6500). Sharing the cab of the Action-Line pickup trucks, medium-duty trucks used heavier-duty frame rails and suspension, a higher hoodline, and wider front and rear axles (with larger wheels). The S-series was a cowled chassis (without a cab), manufactured primarily for (school) bus production.

The medium-duty trucks were equipped with a wide variety of powertrain offerings. For 1967 and 1968, the model line was offered with Chevrolet 250 and 292 inline-6s, and 283, 307, 327 and 366 V8s; diesel engine offerings included the GMC Toroflow 479 V6 and the Detroit Diesel 4-53 inline-4. For 1969, the engine line was revised; the previous small-block V8s were dropped in favor of a single 350 V8 and a 427 V8 was introduced above the 366 big-block V8. GMC trucks were offered with 305 and 351 V6s, which were available for Chevrolets for 1972.

A 4- or 5-speed manual transmission with a deep-reduction 1st gear and an Allison 6-speed automatic transmission were available. Optional 2-speed rear axles could be shifted while moving, giving each gear two ratios.

For 1973, General Motors introduced medium-duty trucks derived from the Rounded-Line C/K generation; the S-series cowled bus chassis continued production for another decade, lasting through the 1983 model year.

Slotted above the 2-ton C60 (GMC 6500) medium-duty range, the Chevrolet/GMC heavy-duty range (70/80 and 7500/8500-series) also shared their cabs with the C/K pickup trucks. Split into the short-hood H/J series and the long-hood M-series; the former served as the predecessor of the Chevrolet Bruin/GMC Brigadier while the latter preceded the Chevrolet Bison/GMC General conventionals of the 1970s.
