= Bechamoun =

Village situated in Mount Lebanon

Bechamoun Arabic: بشامون
- Village
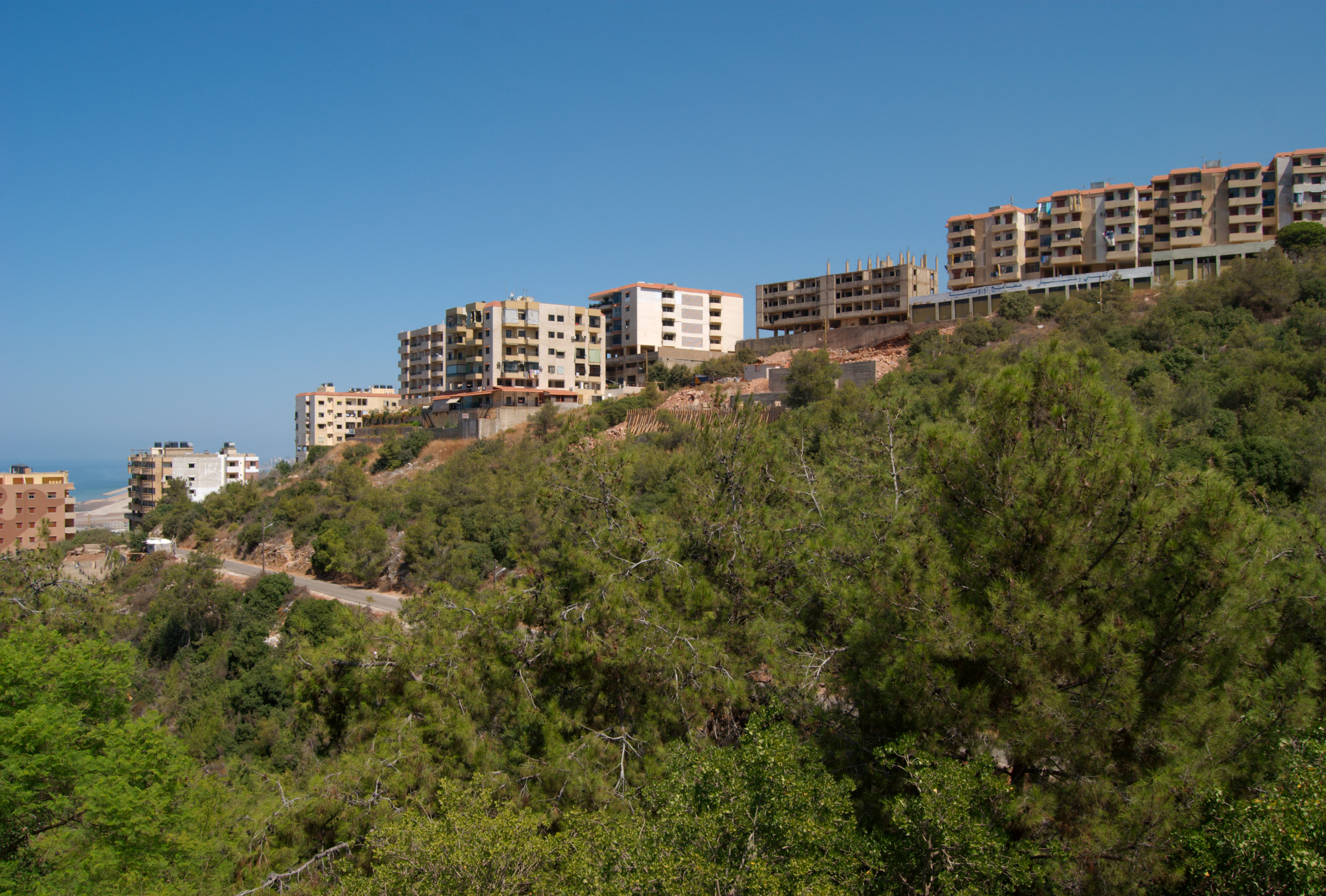
- Bechamoun

- Location within Lebanon
- Coordinates: 33.781936°N 35.531131°E
- Country: Lebanon
- Governate: Mount Lebanon

Area
  - Total: 6.6 km^{2} (2.5 sq mi)

Population
  - Total: 80,000+

Bechamoun (Arabic: بشامون, romanized: Bshāmūn), is a town near Beirut in the Mount Lebanon Governorate of Lebanon. It has an area about 6.6 square kilometres and elevation between 60 and 580 metres above sea level. It lies 8 kilometres from Beirut’s airport and central Beirut. The town has a population of greater than 80000.

In November 1943, when the President of the Republic Bechara el-Khoury, the Prime Minister Riad el-Solh, and the majority of the ministers were arrested by the French mandatory forces, Speaker of Parliament Sabri Hmadeh, Emir Majid Arslan, Minister Habib Abou Chahla and the survivors of the French coup took refuge in Bechamoun and formed a free government, taking up arms in the event of a French attack. The government of Free Lebanon, known as the "Government of Bechamoun", maintained its positions until the prisoners were released on November 22, 1943.

Bechamoun was the first village to have raised the new Lebanese flag, adopted in secret by the deputies.

== Name ==
Bchamoun's name is derived from “Beit Chamoun” (Arabic). The word comes from Syriac Aramaic spoken by the Canaanites. “House of Chamoun” (English), "Temple of Eshmun" (Syriac Aramaic), a Phoenician god.

== Schools ==
Bchamoun has 10 schools, 8 private and 2 governmental.

== Hospitals ==
There is only one hospital in Bchamoun which is Bchamoun Speciality Hospital.

== Geography and Archaeology ==
Bchamoun is divided to 3 parts.

1. Al Daia' zone which is the old village and its three hills surrounded with forests and great views toward Beirut
2. Madares
3. Yanar is a modern city that lies under the hills overlooking the airport and Beirut.

An archaeological site was discovered 6 kilometres (3.7 mi) east of Khalde by V. Hankey in 1963. The site is located on the western terraces of a conical hill, west of the main village called Qalaa' Tahun-el-Haoua. An unpublished collection was also made by R. Saidah. Various potsherds were found and dated back to the Early Bronze Age by Maurice Dunand. Amongst the pottery was a sherd with a cylinder seal showing pattern of marching and alternating goats and lions that was similar to sherds showing a similar type of animalism from Byblos, Megiddo and other Palestinian and Syrian sites dating to the EB period. Although some thinner pink ware was found, sherds were usually red or grey, thick and well fired. The forms suggested were large, flat based jars with flared rims. Decorations found included incised patterns, made with combs to form bands of chevrons. Similar finds were discovered at Jaita I, Kaffer Jarra Roueisse, Nahr Damour, Aramoun and Khallet-el-Khazen. Two used flint blades were found along with part of a basalt object.

== See also ==
- Druze in Lebanon
- Christianity in Lebanon
