= Ali El-Hajj =

Lebanese Zajal poet

Ali El Hajj (1900-1971), born in Qmatiye, was a Lebanese Zajal poet. He is considered one of the most influential Lebanese poets and leaders. Alongside his achievements in poetry, he played a significant leadership role in the community, including the establishment of the municipality of Qmatiye and heading it from 1961 until he died in 1971; and the continuous call for a united Lebanon in the face of threat, after which he was given a national distinction award.

== Early life ==
He learnt reading and writing under one of the village elders. He graduated from high school from the school of Islamic Charitable Purposes in Beirut and continued his studies in the American University of Beirut. Furthermore, he then taught the Arabic and English languages in the schools of Islamic Charitable Purposes. He resigned from his role as a school teacher in 1929 on request from Assaad el-Khoury el-Féghali (nicknamed the Charhrour) to focus on folk poetry. He married Shafika Nasreddine at an early age and had 4 children:

1. Hussein (1925-1965).
2. Abbas (1927-1977).
3. Najib (1934-1994).
4. Muhiba (1930-2004).

== Career ==
=== Ali El Hajj and Assaad el-Khoury el-Féghali ===
Ali El Hajj interacted with the Chahrour on two separate occasions:

1. Winter, 1928, in Al-Bahhar- Alia Hotel
2. End of Summer, 1928, when the Chahrour asked him to join with a number of verses.

The second interaction was a great success. It was then that Ali El Hajj resigned from teaching to join the Assaad el-Khoury el-Féghali's Choir, which was then composed of: Assaad el-Khoury el-Féghali himself, Amin Ayyoub, Yousef Abdullah AlKahali, and Salim Wakid. Throughout 1929, the Choir's composition became: Assaad el-Khoury el-Féghali, Ali El Hajj, Anis Rouhana, Tanios Abdo. This became the first choir to hold parties publicly. After the passing of Assaad el-Khoury el-Féghali in 11 October 1937, Ali El Hajj lead the choir after the joining of Emil Rizkallah.

=== Ali El Hajj and Dr. Taha Hussein ===
Due to popular demand by the Lebanese community in Egypt, the choir (without Tanios Abdo) travelled to Egypt to hold concerts there in 1936. There, they gained the attention of Dr. Taha Hussein and Umm Kulthum. Their stay in Egypt lasted six months.

== Works ==
=== Impromptu Exchanges ===
1. Khalil Rokz, the Chahrour and Ali El Hajj: https://www.youtube.com/watch?v=x-Qrn1NDyAI&feature=youtu.be
2. Lebanese expatriate, Ali El Hajj: https://www.youtube.com/watch?v=EkTySRbuhas&feature=youtu.be
