= Mountain war =

Mountain war may refer to:

- Mountain War (Lebanon), part of the Lebanese Civil War
- Mountain warfare, military operations in mountains and rough terrain
