= 3rd Infantry Brigade (Lebanon) =

- Unit insignia of the 3rd Infantry Brigade
- Active: 1983 – 1984; 1991 – present
- Country: Lebanon
- Allegiance: Lebanon
- Branch: Lebanese Ground Forces
- Type: Mechanized infantry
- Size: Brigade
- Engagements: Lebanese Civil War: Mountain War; Battle of Sidon (1991); South Lebanon conflict (1985–2000): Ansariya ambush; Syrian civil war spillover in Lebanon: 2013 Sidon clash

Commanders
- Colonel: Nizar Abdelkader
- Colonel: Said al-Qaqur
- Colonel: Adnan el-Khatib

The 3rd Infantry Brigade (Lebanon) is a Lebanese Army unit that fought in the Lebanese Civil War, being active since its creation in January 1983 until its disbandment in December 1984, being subsequently re-formed in June 1991.

== Origins ==
In the aftermath of the June–September 1982 Israeli invasion of Lebanon, President Amin Gemayel, convinced that a strong and unified national defense force was a prerequisite to rebuilding the nation, announced plans to raise a 60,000-man army organized into twelve brigades (created from existing infantry regiments), trained and equipped by France and the United States. In late 1982, the 3rd Infantry Regiment was therefore re-organized and expanded to a brigade group numbering 2,000 men, mostly Sunni Muslims from Southern Lebanon, which became on January 18, 1983, at the southern port city of Sidon, the 3rd Infantry Brigade.

== Emblem ==
The Brigade's emblem consists of a silvered sword that symbolizes law and strength, emerging from the brown soil of the country, held firmly by the hands of the 3rd Brigade soldiers in the defense of their homeland. The sword is embraced by a blazing flame symbolizing sacrifice, which enlightens Lebanon's blue sky and burns the enemy with his flames, so that the green cedar tree remains eternal, uniting all Lebanese in its heart, the same as the Arabic numeral (3) inserted at the center of the cedar. The emblem also bears the motto "Our land is ours" written in Arabic script.

== Structure and organization ==
The new unit grew from an understrength battalion comprising three rifle companies to a fully equipped mechanized infantry brigade, capable of aligning a Headquarters' (HQ) battalion, an armoured battalion (34th) equipped with Panhard AML-90 armoured cars, AMX-13 light tanks (replaced in the 1990s by T-55A tanks donated by Syria) and M48A5 main battle tanks (MBTs), three mechanized infantry battalions (31st, 32nd and 33rd) issued with M113 armored personnel carriers (APC), plus an artillery battalion (35th) fielding US M114 155 mm howitzers and various mortars. The Brigade also fielded a logistics battalion, equipped with US M151A2 jeeps, Land-Rover long wheelbase series III (replaced by Land Rover Defender 90s and Humvees received in the 2000s), Chevrolet C20 and Dodge Ram (1st generation) pickups, and US M35A2 2½-ton (6x6) military trucks. Headquartered at the Mohamed Zogheib Barracks near Sidon, in 1983 it was initially placed under the command of Colonel Nizar Abdelkader, later replaced by Col. Said al-Qaqur, in turn succeeded in 1984 by Col. Adnan el-Khatib.

== Combat history ==
=== The Lebanese Civil War ===
Commanded by Colonel Nizar Abdelkader, the Third Brigade during the Mountain War was split into two separated commands deployed at different locations: some of its battalions were positioned in east Beirut, at the Hadath and the Faculty of Sciences sectors leading to the southern suburbs of the Lebanese Capital, while the other units remained stationed at Sidon. During the Battle for west Beirut on February 6, 1984, the Third Brigade's battalions stationed at Beirut's eastern sector provided support to the other Lebanese Army units deployed in the western sector of the city fighting the anti-Government Muslim militias.

In late February-early March 1984, the Third Brigade was placed under the command of Col. Said al-Qaqur and its units previously stationed at east Beirut were transferred back to Sidon, taken by ship under the auspices of the Lebanese Navy. At that time, it was presumed that the Brigade would eventually patrol the Southern regions along the Israeli border. Until early 1983, the Sidon-based units of the Brigade could not leave Israeli-controlled areas for training, but that was no longer the case by mid-year. Confined to barracks for most of the time and forced into inactivity, the Third Brigade was finally disbanded on December 1, 1984, by order of the Lebanese Armed Forces (LAF) Command in east Beirut and by 1987 its units had been dispersed.

=== The post-civil war years 1990–present ===
Upon the end of the war in October 1990, the LAF Command proceeded to reorganize and expand the Lebanese Army's battered mechanized infantry brigades structure, with the Third Brigade being officially re-established in Sidon on June 1, 1991.

== See also ==
- Ansariya ambush
- Lebanese Arab Army (LAA)
- Lebanese Armed Forces
- Lebanese Civil War
- List of extrajudicial killings and political violence in Lebanon
- Lebanese Forces
- List of weapons of the Lebanese Civil War
- Mountain War (Lebanon)
- Progressive Socialist Party
- People's Liberation Army (Lebanon)
- Popular Nasserist Organization (PNO)
- 1st Infantry Brigade (Lebanon)
- 2nd Infantry Brigade (Lebanon)
- 4th Infantry Brigade (Lebanon)
- 5th Infantry Brigade (Lebanon)
- 6th Infantry Brigade (Lebanon)
- 7th Infantry Brigade (Lebanon)
- 8th Infantry Brigade (Lebanon)
- 9th Infantry Brigade (Lebanon)
- 10th Infantry Brigade (Lebanon)
- 11th Infantry Brigade (Lebanon)
- 12th Infantry Brigade (Lebanon)
