= Ksar Akil flake =

Type of flint tool

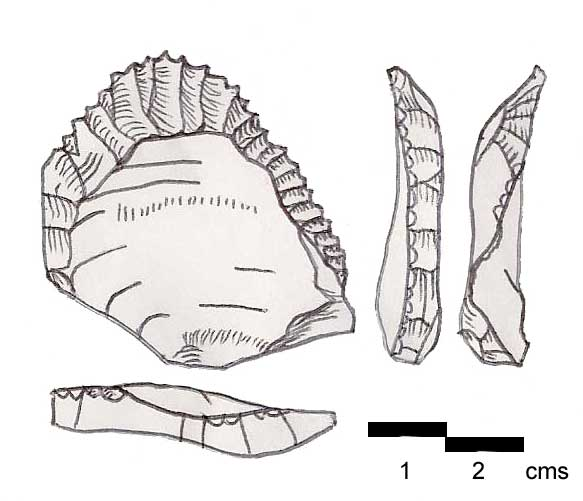
Ksar Akil Flake made by Levallois technique. Found on the surface at Ksar Akil, Lebanon. Blue-grey jurassic flint that patinates to white.

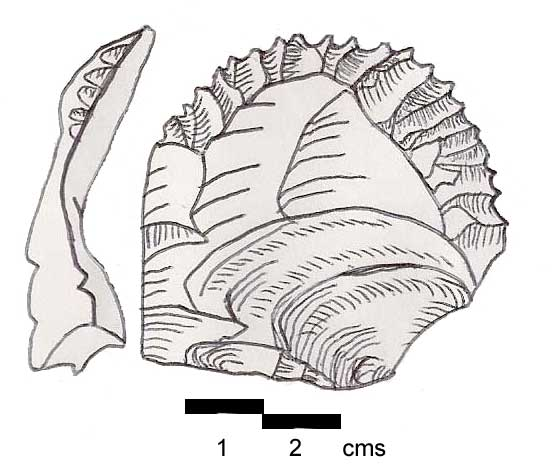
Ksar Akil flake on a flake fragment with fluted retouch at the tip which forms a round, denticulated edge. Found at Borj Barajne.

Ksar Akil Flake is an oval type of Lithic flake with fine, regular teeth at frequent intervals. The flint tool is named after the archaeological site of Ksar Akil in Lebanon, where several examples were found and suggested to date to the late Upper Paleolithic.

Two Ksar Akil Flakes are held by the National Museum of Beirut, marked as "level V", which had a base point at around 3 metres (9.8 ft) below datum. Other examples are held by the Archaeological Museum of the American University of Beirut, Lorraine Copeland and some are also likely to be among the Ksar Akil material held in London. Five other examples are held in the Museum of Lebanese Prehistory found at Borj Barajne in the Sands of Beirut along with two worn examples discovered at Antelias Cave. Another Ksar Akil flake was found at El-Emireh.
