= Abbas Awad =

Lebanese footballer (born 1993)

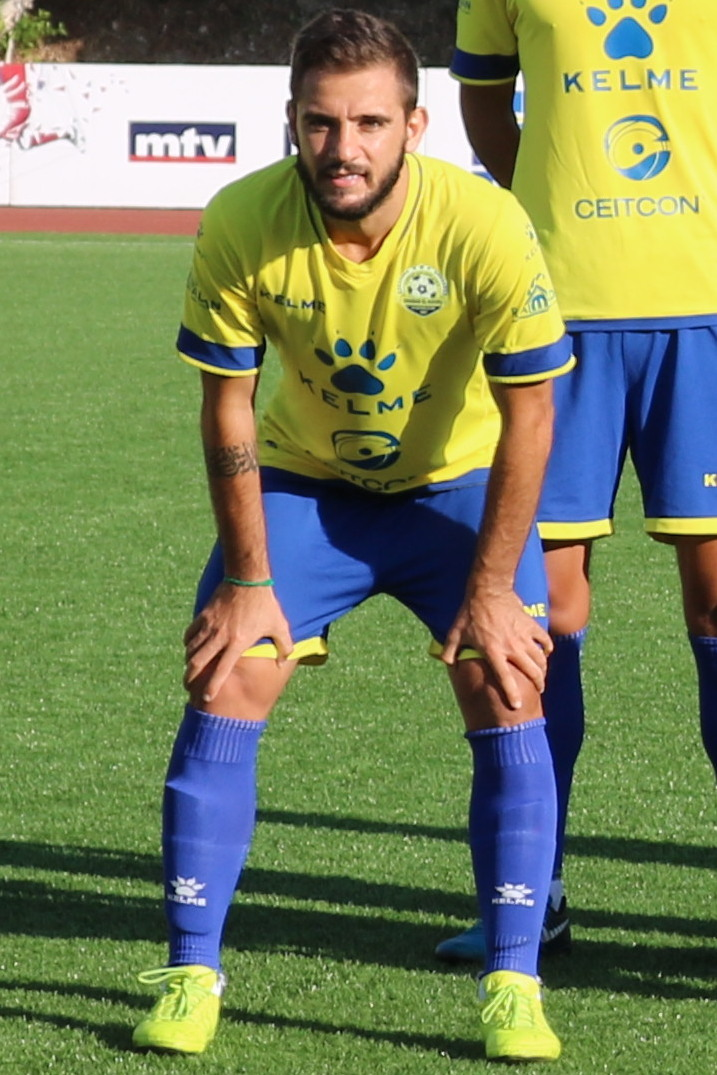
- Awad with Shabab Bourj in 2020

Personal information
- Full name: Abbas Kassem Awad
- Date of birth: 1 August 1993 (age 33)
- Place of birth: Qmatiye, Lebanon
- Height: 1.78 m (5 ft 10 in)
- Position: Full-back

Senior career*
Years	Team	Apps	(Gls)
2012–2013	Shabab Arabi		
2013–2017	Ansar	10	(0)
2016–2017	→ Racing Beirut (loan)	15	(0)
2017–2020	Bank of Beirut (futsal)		
2020–2022	Shabab Bourj	26	(1)
2022–2023	Safa	7	(0)
Total		58	(1)

International career
2015	Lebanon U23	3	(0)
2014	Lebanon	2	(0)
- * Club domestic league appearances and goals

Abbas Kassem Awad (Arabic: عباس قاسم عوض; born 1 August 1993) is a Lebanese former footballer who played as a full-back.

== Club career ==
Starting his career at Shabab Arabi in the Lebanese Third Division, on 1 August 2013, Lebanese Premier League club Ansar announced the signing of Awad. On 31 August 2016, Awad moved on a one-year loan to Racing Beirut.

Between 2017 and 2020, Awad played futsal for Bank of Beirut. He joined Shabab Bourj on 28 August 2020, and Safa on 12 August 2022.

== International career ==
Awad played for the Lebanon national under-23 team in 2015 at the 2016 AFC U-23 Championship qualification.

He was first called up to the Lebanon national team in October 2014, as part of a mixed squad of senior and Olympic players for friendly matches against Qatar and Saudi Arabia. He made two caps for Lebanon in 2014, against Qatar and the United Arab Emirates.

== Honours ==
Racing Beirut

- Lebanese Challenge Cup: 2016
