= Dahr al-Wahsh =

Coordinates: 33.824798°N 35.597394°E

Dahr al-Wahsh (also spelled Dahr al-Wahch) is a village in Lebanon, located 12 kilometres (7.5 mi) to the east of Beirut. Dahr al-Wahsh land is divided between the city of Aley and the towns of Kahale and Araya.

It has received attention as the site of an October, 1990 conflict termed the "Dahr al-Wahsh massacre" by Middle-East studies professor Mordechai Nisan. Interpretation and description of the event varies according to source.

== Dahr al-Wahsh massacre ==
Dahr al-Wahsh has received attention as the site of an October, 1990 conflict termed the "Dahr al-Wahsh massacre" by Middle-East studies professor Mordechai Nisan. Interpretation and description of the event varies according to source.

In 2000, the Lebanese militia Guardians of the Cedars released a statement which included the following description of the event:

The people of the village of Dahr al Wahch saw Syrian soldiers push a column of Lebanese prisoners who were walking in their shorts towards some unknown destination. A nun, a nurse at the governmental hospital of Baabda, saw the arrival of corpses and of the Red Cross ambulances. "I counted between 75 and 80, she explained. Most of them had a bullet in the back of their heads or in their mouth. The corpses still carried the mark of cords around their wrists." The rigidity of the corpses fixed their crossed arms behind their backs. They were naked, wearing only shorts. Some ten of them had their eyes gouged out, another ten had an arm or leg cut off. All had been shot in their heads. There can be no doubt about their execution. The Hraoui government announced that there had been no massacres.

Izzat Nweilati, in a paper published by the journal of the Syrian Human Rights Committee, describes the event as the result of a miscommunication, when Lebanese forces at Dahr al-Wahsh did not receive cease-fire orders from Michel Aoun and so attacked Syrian troops who were crossing a landmine field. With 150 of their own killed, the Syrians retaliated against the Lebanese for deviating against the "rules of war". Newilati, who indicates that then Defense Minister of Lebanon Albert Mansour described the event as a "double massacre", states that the corpses he found a day after the event had been "shot in the head while their hands were tied to their backs", most unclothed.

Lebanese-born Walid Phares of the Foundation for Defense of Democracies posits that the Lebanese attacked the Syrians as a matter of choice, refusing to surrender to Syrian invasion. He describes the battle as an "illustrious episode" in "a short war with terrorism", following which the Syrians tortured and executed soldiers and civilians as an act of revenge.
