= Kaifun =

Kaifun كيفون Keyfoun
- Location in Lebanon
- Coordinates: 33°47′07″N 35°33′33″E
- Country: Lebanon
- Governorate: Mount Lebanon Governorate
- District: Aley District

Area
  - Total: 0.67 sq mi (1.74 km^{2})
- Elevation: 2,600 ft (800 m)
- Time zone: UTC+2 (EET)
  - Summer (DST): +3

Kaifun (Arabic: كيفون, romanized: Kayfūn), (also transliterated Kaifoun, Keyfoun and Kayfoun) is a village in Aley District, Mount Lebanon Governorate, Lebanon. It is bordered by Souk El Gharb to the north, Ain Aanoub and Bechamoun to the west and Baissour to the south. It is around 800 meters above sea level and 26 kilometers away from Beirut.

Kaifun is a popular summer recreational destination for Beirut's residents, and is famous for its Pine forest and view of the Mediterranean Sea.

== History ==
When Mamluks intensified their persecution against Shia Muslims in 1305, a group of Shiites from Beirut (Burj Beirut) settled in Qmatiye and Kaifun, the only major Shia villages in Aley District. Feudal Shiite families from Jabal Amel also settled the town in 19th century.

In 1838, Eli Smith noted the place, called Keifun, located in El-Ghurb el-Fokany; Upper el-Ghurb.

On October 3 2024 Kaifun was bombed by the IDF during the Israeli invasion of Lebanon.

== Demographics ==
Kaifun's natives are Shia Muslims.

Main families include:

- Jawhar
- Saad
- El-Hajj
- Al-Hakim (Ahmad)
- Dagher
- Sirhal
- Reslan
- El-Zein
- Khalife
- Awada
- Jaber
- Jadeed
- Salloukh
- Al-Qadi
- Al-Sheikh

== Bibliography ==
- Robinson, E.; Smith, E. (1841). Biblical Researches in Palestine, Mount Sinai and Arabia Petraea: A Journal of Travels in the year 1838. Vol. 3. Boston: Crocker & Brewster.
