= Mordechai Nisan =

Israeli academic

Mordechai Nisan (Hebrew: מרדכי ניסן; born 24 June 1947) is an Israeli professor and scholar of Middle East Studies at the Rothberg International School of the Hebrew University of Jerusalem. He taught also at Bar-Ilan University, the Open University, and the University of the Holy Land in addition to some Israeli colleges.

== Academic career ==
Mordechai Nisan was a contributing expert to the Ariel Center for Policy Research and a research consultant for the Jerusalem Institute for Western Defense. Nisan has written extensively in English and Hebrew. He holds a Ph.D. from McGill University in Montreal. He has been described as a proponent of the counter-jihadist worldview of Bat Ye'or.

== Published works ==
- "The Syrian occupation of Lebanon", NATIV, Ariel Center for Policy Research, Volume Thirteen, Number 3 (74), June 2000.
- Nisan, Mordechai (Fall 2002). "Islam and Dhimmitude". Middle East Quarterly. 9 (4).
- "The War of Islam Against Minorities in the Middle East," in Muhammad's Monsters, 2004
- "Kadima's Treachery Must be Punished at the Polls" March 27, 2006
- (1977): The Arab-Israeli Conflict, A Political Guide for the Perplexed. The Joshua Group.
- (1978): Israel and the Territories A study in Control 1967-1977. Ramat Gan: Turtledove. ISBN 978-965-200-005-7.
- (1982): American Middle East Foreign Policy: A Political Reevaluation. Griffin, GA: Dawn Pub. Co. ISBN 978-0-9690001-1-2.
- (1991): Toward A New Israel: The Jewish State and the Arab Question. New York: AMS Press. ISBN 978-0-404-61631-1.
- (1999): Identity and Civilization: Essays on Judaism, Christianity, and Islam. University Press of America. ISBN 978-0-7618-1356-9.
- (2002): Minorities in the Middle East: A History of Struggle and Self-Expression (2nd ed.). McFarland & Company. ISBN 978-0-7864-1375-1.
- (2003): The Conscience of Lebanon: A Political Biography of Etienne Sakr (Abu-Arz). London: Routledge Publishers. ISBN 978-0-7146-8378-2.
- (2011): Only Israel West of the River: The Jewish State and the Palestinian Question. Createspace.com. ISBN 978-1-4610-2726-3.
- (2015) Politics and War in Lebanon: Unraveling the Enigma, Transaction Publishers.
- (2019) The Crack-up of the Israeli Left, Mantua Books.
