= Yazbaki =

Druze clan in Lebanon

The Yazbaki clan is a prominent Druze family in Lebanon and, alongside the Jumblatt clan, has been one of the two dominant Druze clans since the mid-18th century. Both clans have historically vied for significant influence within the Lebanese political establishment.

== History ==
The Yazbaki faction has been led by the Arslan family, whose leadership dates back to the 15th century.

An inner-Druze conflict in Lebanon during the 18th and early 19th centuries brought the Yazbaki and Jumblatt factions to prominence in Druze political affairs in Mount Lebanon. This division likely stems from the Druze tactic of aligning with various power contenders during crises, showcasing their adaptability (Yazbakis) and resilience (Jumblattis).

During the Lebanese Civil War, the Arslan family's status declined due to their collaboration with the Kataeb Party. To prevent the Arslan clan from regaining influence, the politician Walid Jumblatt offered numerous Yazbaki activists positions within his various organizations.

== Political influence ==
Both the Yazbaki and Jumblatt clans have played crucial roles in Lebanese politics, often competing for power and influence within the Druze community and the broader political landscape of Lebanon. Throughout its history, the Yazbaki leadership has generally supported the existing political establishment and the concept of "legitimacy."

== See also ==
- Druze in Lebanon
- Jumblatt family
- Arslan family
