= Qmatiye =

Village in Aley District in the Mount Lebanon Governorate of Lebanon

Qamatiyeh قماطية
- Town
- Qamatiyeh shown within Lebanon
- Coordinates: 33°48′05″N 35°34′47″E
- Country: Lebanon
- Governorate: Mount Lebanon
- District: Aley
- City: Aley

Area
  - Total: 0.87 km^{2} (0.34 sq mi)
- Time zone: UTC+2 (EET)
  - Summer (DST): UTC+3 (EEST)
- ISO 3166 code: LB

Qmatiye (Arabic: قماطية, romanized: Qmaṭiyeh) is a village in Aley District in the Mount Lebanon Governorate of Lebanon. It lies right beneath the town of Souk El Gharb. The village has a small population and is a famous tourist attraction in the summer.

== History ==
When Mamluks intensified their persecution against Shia Muslims in 1363, a group of Shiites from Beirut (Burj Beirut) settled in Qmatiye and Kayfoun, the only major Shia villages in Aley District.

In 1838, Eli Smith noted the place, called el-Kummatiyeh, located in El-Ghurb el-Fokany, upper el-Ghurb.

== Demographics ==
Qmatiye's natives are predominantly Shia Muslims with Christian and Sunni minorities.

Main families in the village are:

- Nassereddine
- Hamade
- Jaafar
- Zarwi
- Awada
- Doughaily
- Salloukh
- Chu'aib

== Notable people ==
- Abbas Awad - footballer

== Bibliography ==
- Robinson, E.; Smith, E. (1841). Biblical Researches in Palestine, Mount Sinai and Arabia Petraea: A Journal of Travels in the year 1838. Vol. 3. Boston: Crocker & Brewster.
