= Khallet-el-Khazen =

El-Khazen Tract (خلة خازن ) is on the southern part of the mountain of Lebanon with altitudes between 750 m and 910 m above sea level. The Tract is an area that has witnessed many historical events, from the Phoenicians to modern day Lebanon. There is a cave in the area that is similar to the one of Jeitta Grotto, however it is not as big, being the 8th biggest in Lebanon. Streams of the Litani River pass through the land making the soil very fertile and fit for many agricultural purposes. The land is covered in trees, grass, fruits, and vegetables. Wildlife also is present in the area. Being covered in coniferous forests, it is a really good habitat for animals like rabbits, owls, squirrels, dears, and many others. The Brown Syrian Bear was also present in the area before being extinct in Lebanon due to hunting.
