= Aramoun, Aley =

Aramoun, Aley عرمون
- Village
- Location within Lebanon
- Coordinates: 33°45′35″N 35°31′15″E
- Country: Lebanon
- Governorate: Mount Lebanon Governorate
- District: Aley District

Area
  - Total: 11.68 km^{2} (4.51 sq mi)
- Elevation: 500 m (1,600 ft)
- Time zone: UTC+2 (EET)
  - Summer (DST): +3

Aramoun (Arabic: عرمون) is a village in the Aley District of Mount Lebanon, Lebanon, lying to the east of Khalde and 22 kilometres away from Beirut. Aramoun's altitude ranges between 250 meters to 600 meters further east. The village has a Druze and Christian community, major families are Yehia, Jawhari, Halabi, Mohtar, Abu Ghanam and Dakdouk.

== Nature ==
The village is primarily known for its olives and olive oil as it enjoys a mountain Mediterranean climate. It is also fairly forested.

== Education ==
Aramoun contains 18 schools, of which two are public serving 699 students, and 16 are private serving 2,372 students.
