= February 6 Intifada =

1984 battle of the Lebanese Civil War

- Part of the Lebanese Civil War
Date	6 February 1984
Location	West Beirut
Result	Amal Movement & LNRF victory: Virtual collapse of the Lebanese Armed Forces

Belligerents
Amal Movement; Lebanese National Resistance Front; PSP; SSNP-L; LCP; ASAP-L; (Lebanon) 6th Infantry Brigade; Supported by: Syria	(Lebanon) Lebanese Armed Forces; Supported by: Multinational Force in Lebanon; United States; France; Italy; United Kingdom

Commanders and leaders
Nabih Berri; Walid Jumblatt; Inaam Raad; George Hawi; Hussein Hamdan (Lebanon) Col. Lutfi Jabbar	(Lebanon) Amine Gemayel (Lebanon) Ibrahim Tannous (Lebanon) Michel Aoun

The February 6 Intifada or February 6 uprising in West Beirut took place on 6 February 1984 during the Lebanese Civil War. It was a battle where the Shia Amal Movement and the Druze Progressive Socialist Party decisively defeated the Lebanese army and the Multinational Force present in Lebanon that supported it. It resulted in the collapse of the United States and Israel's influence in Lebanon, and the beginning of the War of the Camps.

== Background ==
The Lebanese army was in full control of Beirut since the Israeli withdrawal. However, they were accused of partisanship, and of orchestrating mass arrests in West Beirut, up to 2,000 Shiites in Dahieh, which led residents to see them more as an occupying army doing as they please upon a defeated population.

The May 17 Agreement which was signed earlier in 1983, was largely denounced by the Muslims and the Syrians, who saw it as an admission of defeat and a recognition of Israel.

Moreover, the US-led Multinational Force present in Lebanon were originally seen as a peacekeeping force in Beirut. However, during the 1983-1984 Mountain War, they aided the Lebanese Army against the Druze PSP and their allies by heavily shelling the Chouf and West Beirut, the heaviest offshore bombardment the U.S. had conducted since the Korean war, cementing their image as just another faction in the civil war.

The 1983 United States embassy bombing in Beirut and the 1983 Beirut barracks bombings were precursors to the February 6 Intifada.

== Events of February 6 ==
On 6 February 1984 leaders of various Lebanese factions were invited by Syrian President Hafez al-Assad to visit Damascus to sort out their difference there. The February 6 intifada was planned to happen while they were all gone. This was to leave the major role in the battle to the Amal Movement, with the intention of elevating their political and military importance.

On that day, resistance fighters based in West Beirut made a total sweeping attack against the Lebanese army. Many Muslim and Druze units had defected to Amal and PSP militias. It turned out to be a decisive victory for Amal.

== Aftermath ==
Following the battle, the Lebanese Army virtually collapsed. With the U.S. Marines looking ready to withdraw, Syrian Arab Republic and Muslim groups stepped up pressure on Lebanese President Amine Gemayel. On 5 March 1984, as a result of the Intifada and the parallel Mountain War, the Lebanese Government canceled the 17 May Agreement, which was favored by Israel and the United States. The Marines departed a few weeks later. Hafez al-Assad thus became the main external power broker in Lebanon.

The events of February 6 set the stage for the War of the Camps, a dark phase of Lebanese civil war characterized by inter-factional violence between members of the same religion and prolonged stalemates. The war would continue for the next 6 years until its conclusion in 1990.

== Legacy ==
The February 6 intifada cemented Hafez al-Assad's reputation as the only Arab leader who stood up against the ambitions on the United States and Israel in a military confrontation, and won.

In Lebanon, politicians generally don't either celebrate, commemorate or condemn the events of 6 February 1984, as doing so would have an ambiguous and potentially divisive significance.

== See also ==
- Intifada
- Syrian military presence in Lebanon
- List of weapons of the Lebanese Civil War
