= Khalde =

Khalde خلدة
- Town
- Location in Lebanon
- Coordinates: 33°47′N 35°29′E
- Country: Lebanon
- Governorate: Mount Lebanon
- District: Aley
- Time zone: UTC+2 (EET)
  - Summer (DST): +3

Khaldah (Arabic: خلدة) is a coastal town located 12 kilometres (7.5 mi) south of Beirut, Lebanon. It is famous as a tourist destination in the summer, especially for its various beach resorts.

The southern portion of Beirut–Rafic Hariri International Airport is located in Khaldah, in addition to a Lebanese Air Force base. Also, the motorway connecting Beirut and Southern Lebanon passes through Khaldah. The town itself lacks any form of urban planning, and in the past few years, most of the green areas have been replaced by commercial and apartment buildings. Some vegetables and citrus trees can still be seen growing in smaller and dispersed areas. As for industries, there are aluminum and glass factories in this area.

== Schools and universities ==
Besides commerce and industries, Khaldah also houses educational institutions such as one islamic University and two Schools.

== History ==
Archeological excavations evidence that the site has been occupied since at least the beginning of the first millennium BC. A few kilometers south of Khaldah is Khan Khaldah, where a major Roman-Byzantine settlement once existed. Here, two 5th and 6th century AD Christian basilicas were found, one built over the other and both were paved with mosaics.

Later during the 1980s, Khalde was used as an unregulated seaport run by Amal.

=== Battle of Khaldeh ===
The highway to Beirut from the South at Khalde was the scene of an intense battle during the 1982 Israeli invasion of Lebanon. When the Israeli army arrived on 11 June, a coalition of Amal, Lebanese Communist Party and PLO fighters fought a rearguard action which held up Israeli progress towards Beirut for six days. The joint forces gave the Israelis the first experience of serious ground opposition in the advance to Beirut. According to journalist Robert Fisk, the Shia militiamen were running on foot into Israeli gunfire to launch grenades the armor, moving to within 20 feet of the tanks to open fire at them. Reportedly, some of the Shia fighters had torn off pieces of their shirts and wrapped them around their heads as bands of martyrdom as the Islamic Revolutionary Guard Corps troops had done in the Iran–Iraq War.

== See also ==
- Amal Movement
- Beirut
- Chouf District
- Lebanese Civil War
- Mountain War (Lebanon)
- 4th Infantry Brigade (Lebanon)
- 6th Infantry Brigade (Lebanon)
