= Lebanese Resistance Regiments =

Former Armed Wing of the Amal Movement

Lebanese Resistance Regiments أفواج المقاومة اللبنانية
- Lebanese Resistance Regiments flag (1975-1991)
- Founders: Musa al-Sadr; Hussein el-Husseini
- Spiritual leaders: Musa al-Sadr; Mohammad Mehdi Shamseddine
- Political leaders: Hussein el-Husseini; Nabih Berri
- Dates active: 1975–1991
- Dissolved: 1991
- Headquarters: Jnah (Chyah, Beirut)
- Active regions: West Beirut; Southern Lebanon; Bekaa Valley; Chouf District
- Ideology: Lebanese Nationalism; Patriotism; Militarism; Big Tent; Anti-Imperialism; Anti-Zionism; Factions: Shia Islamism; Jihadism; Islamic Nationalism; Arab Nationalism; Sectarianism; Pro-Khomeinism
- Status: Disbanded
- Size: 16,000 fighters
- Part of: Amal Movement; Front of Patriotic and National Parties
- Wars: Lebanese Civil War; South Lebanon conflict (1985–2000)

The Lebanese Resistance Regiments (Arabic: أفواج المقاومة اللبنانية, romanized: ʾAfwāj al-Muqāwama al-Lubnāniyya, or أَمَل AMAL), also designated Lebanese Resistance Battalions, Lebanese Resistance Detachments, Lebanese Resistance Legions and Battalions de la Resistance Libanaise (BRL), but simply known by its Arabic acronym أَمَل ʾAmal which means "Hope", were the military wing of the Amal Movement, a political organization representing the Muslim Shia community of Lebanon. The movement's political wing was officially founded in February 1973 from a previous organization bearing the same name and its military wing was formed in January 1975. The Amal militia was a major player in the Lebanese Civil War from 1975 to 1991. The militia has now been disarmed, though the movement itself, now known as the Amal Movement (Arabic: Harakat Amal), is a notable Shia political party in Lebanon alongside Hezbollah.

== Creation ==
The Amal militia was founded in 1975 as the militant wing of the Movement of the Disinherited, a Shi'a political movement founded by Musa al-Sadr and Hussein el-Husseini a year earlier. It became one of the most important Shi'a Muslim militias during the Lebanese Civil War. Amal grew strong with the support of, and through its ties with, Syria and the 300,000 Shi'a internal refugees from southern Lebanon after the Israeli bombings in the early 1980s. Amal's practical objectives were to gain greater respect for Lebanon's Shi'ite population and the allocation of a larger share of governmental resources for the Shi'ite-dominated southern part of the country.

At its zenith, the militia had 14,000 troops. Amal fought a long campaign against Palestinian refugees during the Lebanese Civil War (called the War of the Camps). After the War of the Camps, Amal fought a bloody battle against rival Shi'a group Hezbollah for control of Beirut, which provoked Syrian military intervention. Hezbollah itself was formed by religious members of Amal who had left after Nabih Berri's assumption of full control and the subsequent resignation of most of Amal's earliest senior members.

== History ==
=== Timeline ===
Flag of the Movement of the Dispossessed or AMAL (1974–present)

Harakat al-Mahrumin (حركة المحرومين | The Movement of the Dispossessed) was established by Imam Musa al-Sadr and member of parliament Hussein el-Husseini in 1974. On January 20, 1975, the Lebanese Resistance Detachments (also referred to in English as 'Battalions of the Lebanese Resistance') is formed as the military wing of the Movement of the Disinherited under the leadership of al-Sadr. In 1978 the founder al-Sadr disappears in mysterious circumstances while visiting Libya and was succeeded by Hussein el-Husseini as leader of Amal.

In 1979 Palestinian guerrillas attempt to assassinate then-Secretary General Hussein el-Husseini by launching missiles into his home, outside Beirut.

In 1980 Hussein el-Husseini resigned from Amal leadership after refusing to "drench Amal in blood" and fight alongside the PLO or any other faction. That same year, Nabih Berri became one of the three highest officials of Amal, marking the entry of Amal in the Lebanese Civil War.

When the Iran–Iraq War raged in September 1980, around 500 to 600 Amal volunteers participated in the war next to Mostafa Chamran, one of the co-founders of Amal.

In summer 1982 Husayn Al-Musawi, deputy head and official spokesman of Amal, broke away to form the Islamist Islamic Amal Movement. In May 1985, heavy fighting erupted between Amal and Palestinian camp militias for the control of the Shatila and Burj el-Barajneh refugee camps in Beirut, sparking the so-called "War of the Camps". Over the following two years the fighting took place in four distinct phases, totalling around eight months of conflict. Amal, despite having tanks, artillery and support from the Lebanese army’s 6th Brigade, failed in its objective of dislodging PLO fighters from the refugee camps and was left significantly weakened. The siege of the refugee camps caused tension between Amal and Hezbollah who were opposed to the offensive.

In December 1985 Nabih Berri of Amal, Walid Jumblatt of the Druze Progressive Socialist Party, and Elie Hobeika of the Lebanese Forces signed the Tripartite Accord in Damascus which was supposed to give strong influence to Damascus regarding Lebanese matters. The agreement never came into effect due to Hobeika's ousting.

In mid-February 1987 fighting broke out in West Beirut between Amal and the Druze PLA in what became known as the "War of the Flag". The conflict was sparked when a PLA fighter entered the Channel 7 TV station (French: Télé Liban – Canal 7) building in the Tallet el-Khayyat quarter and replaced the Lebanese national flag with the PSP flag. Its positions thinly manned due to the War of the Camps, an alliance of PSP, LCP/Popular Guard and SSNP drove out Amal of most of its former positions in West Beirut. As a result, on 21 February, 7,000 Syria commandos, under the command of Major-General Ghazi Kanaan, were deployed into West Beirut. Assisted by Lebanese Internal Security Forces (ISF) gendarmes they immediately closed over fifty militia “offices” and banned the carrying of weapons in public. Young men with beards were detained.

On February 17, 1988 the American Chief of the United Nations Truce Supervision Organization (UNTSO) observer mission in Lebanon, Lt. Col. William R. Higgins, was abducted and later killed after meeting with Amal's political leader of southern Lebanon. It was believed that Hezbollah abducted Higgins, though the party to this day denies it and insists that it was done to create problems between them and the Amal movement. In April 1988, Amal launched an all-out assault on Hezbollah positions in south Lebanon and the southern suburbs of Beirut, which became known as the War of Brothers. By May 1988 Hezbollah gained control of 80% of the Shi'ite suburbs of Beirut through well-timed assaults.

In 1989 Amal accepted the Taif agreement (mainly authored by el-Husseini) in order to end the civil war.

On 17 July 1990 fighters from the Palestinian Fatah militia moved into the Iqlim al-Tufah hills, southeast of Sidon in an attempt to separate fighters from Amal and Hizbullah. Fifteen people had been killed in the fighting. Fatah had played a similar role during clashes in the same area in January. A later report describes two weeks of fighting around Sidon, culminating with Hizbullah taking the village of Jarjouh from Amal on 16 July. This report puts the number of dead at around two hundred.

In September 1991, with background in the Syrian controlled end of the Lebanese Civil War in October 1990, 2,800 Amal troops joined the Lebanese army.

=== Origin ===
The origins of the Amal movement lie with the Lebanese cleric of Iranian origin Imam Musa al-Sadr. In 1974, the Harakat al-Mahrumin (Movement of the Deprived) was established by al-Sadr and member of parliament Hussein el-Husseini to attempt to reform the Lebanese system. While acknowledging its support base to be the "traditionally under-represented politically and economically disadvantaged" Shi'a community, it aimed, according to Palmer-Harik, to seek social justice for all deprived Lebanese. Although influenced by Islamic ideas, it was a secular movement trying to unite people along communal rather than religious or ideological lines. The Greek-Catholic Archbishop of Beirut, Mgr. Grégoire Haddad, was among the founders of the Movement.

On January 20, 1975, the Lebanese Resistance Detachments (also referred to in English as 'The Battalions of the Lebanese Resistance') were formed as a military wing of The Movement of the Disinherited under the leadership of al-Sadr, and came to be popularly known as Amal (from the acronym Afwaj al-Mouqawma Al-Lubnaniyya). In 1978, al-Sadr disappeared in mysterious circumstances while visiting Libya, the Amal movement's regional supporter at the time. There are credible allegations that Yasser Arafat asked Gaddafi to "disappear" al-Sadr. Hussein el-Husseini became leader of Amal and was followed by Nabih Berri in April 1980 after el-Husseini resigned. One of the consequences of the rise of Berri, a less educated leader, the increasing secular yet sectarian nature of the movement and move away from an Islamic context for the movement was a splintering of the movement.

== Military structure and organization ==
The movement's militia was secretly established on 20 January 1975 with the help of the Palestinian Fatah, who provided weapons and training at their Beqaa facilities. The formation of Amal was revealed in July that year when an accidental explosion of a landmine at one of the Fatahland camps near Baalbek killed over 60 Shia trainees, which caused considerable embarrassment to Fatah and forced Al-Sadr to admit publicly the militia's existence. When the civil war finally broke out in April 1975, Amal's strength stood at about 1,500–3,000 armed militants, backed by a motor force of gun trucks and technicals fitted with heavy machine guns, recoilless rifles and anti-aircraft autocannons.

By the mid-1980s however, the movement totalled 14,000–16,000 militiamen trained and armed by Syria, of which 3,000–6,000 were full-time uniformed regulars and the remaining 10,000 part-time male and female irregulars. Amal's regular forces were bolstered by 6,000 ex-Lebanese Army soldiers from the Sixth Brigade, a predominantly Shia Muslim formation that went over to their co-religionists following the collapse of the government forces in February 1984. Commanded by the Shi'ite Colonel (later, Major general) Abd al-Halim Kanj, and headquartered at the Henri Chihab Barracks at Jnah in the south-western Chyah suburb of West Beirut, this formation was subsequently enlarged by absorbing Shia deserters from other Army units, which included the 97th Battalion from the Seventh Brigade. Outside the Lebanese Capital, Amal militia forces operating in Baalbek and Hermel received support from certain elements of the mainly Shi'ite First Brigade stationed in the Beqaa Valley.

== List of Amal Leaders ==
- Musa al-Sadr (1975–1978)
- Hussein el-Husseini (1978–1980)
- Nabih Berri (1980–Present)

=== Amal senior military commanders ===
- Akel Hamieh (a.k.a. 'Hamza')
- Mohamad Saad
- Daoud Daoud
- Mahmood Fakih
- Hassan Jaafar

== Administrative organization and illegal activities ==
Amal's main sphere of influence encompassed the Shia-populated slum districts located at south-western Beirut of Chyah, Bir Abed, Bir Hassan, Ouza'i and Khalde, with the latter including the adjoining International Airport, which they brought under their control in late February 1984. Outside the Lebanese Capital, they also operated at Baalbek and Hermel in the Beqaa, and in the southern Jabal Amel region, notably around the port cities of Tyre and Sidon, and in the Iqlim al-Tuffah region down to the UNIFIL zone.

In addition to Syrian backing, Amal received some financial support from Libya and Iran – first by the Shah in 1975-78, replaced after 1979 by the new Islamic regime – and from the Lebanese Shi'ite immigrant community in West Africa. Additional revenues came from protection rackets (Arabic: Khuwa) imposed on Shia neighborhoods and from tolls levied in illegal ports such as Ouza'i in Beirut, along with Zahrani, whose harbour and the adjacent Tapline oil refinery were employed in the contraband of fuel, and Sarafand (used for smuggling imported cars and other goods), both located south of Sidon.

The Movement had its own civil administration and assistance networks, gathered since the mid-1980s under the authority of the so-called 'Council of the South' (Arabic: مجلس الجنوب | Majliss al-Janoub). Headed by Amal's vice-president Muhammad Baydoun and based at the Christian town of Maghdouché near Sidon, it was responsible for running schools, hospitals, and conducting public works on Shia areas. Amal also run from its headquarters at Rue Hamra – located on the namesake district –, in association with Zaher el-Khatib's Toilers League a joint television service, "The Orient" (Arabic: Al-Machriq).

== Split with "Islamic Amal" ==
In the summer of 1982, Husayn Al-Musawi, deputy head and official spokesman of Amal, broke with Berri over his willingness to go along with U.S. mediation in Lebanon rather than attack Israeli troops, his membership in the National Salvation Council alongside the Christians, and his opposition to pledging allegiance to Ayatollah Khomeini.

Musawi formed the Islamist Islamic Amal Movement, based in Baalbeck. It was aided by the Islamic Republic of Iran which, in the wake of the 1979 Islamic Revolution, strove not only to help Lebanon's Shi'a, but to export the PanIslamic revolution to the rest of the Muslim world, something Musawi strongly supported, saying, "We are her (the Islamic Republic's) children."

We are seeking to formulate an Islamic society which in the final analysis will produce an Islamic state. ... The Islamic revolution will march to liberate Palestine and Jerusalem, and the Islamic state will then spread its authority over the region of which Lebanon is only a part.

About 1,500 members of Iran's Islamic Revolutionary Guard or Pasdaran, arrived at the Beqaa Valley at the time and "directly contributed to ensure the survival and growth of al-Musawi's newly-created small militia," providing training, indoctrination and funding. Iran was in many ways a natural ally of Shia in Lebanon as it was far larger than Lebanon, oil-rich, and both Shi'a-majority and Shi'a-ruled. And of course, founder Musa al-Sadr had come from Iran. Iran's generous funding meant generous pay for the militias recruits—$150–200 per month plus cost-free education and medical treatment for themselves and their families—that "far exceeded what other [Lebanese] militias were able to offer." This was a major incentive among the impoverished Shi'a community, and induced "a sizable number of Amal fighters [to] defected regularly to the ranks" of Islamic Amal, and later Hizb'Allah.

By August 1983, Islamic Amal and Hezbollah were "effectively becoming one under the Hezbollah label," and by late 1984, Islamic Amal, along with "all the known major groups" in Lebanon, had been absorbed into Hezbollah.

== The Amal militia in the Lebanese civil war ==
During the Coastal War in March–April 1985, Amal militia forces joined in a Syrian-backed coalition with the Popular Nasserist Organization (PNO), the Al-Mourabitoun and the Druze Progressive Socialist Party (PSP) militias, which defeated the Christian Lebanese Forces (LF) attempts to establish bridgeheads at Damour and Sidon.

=== The War of the Camps ===
The War of the Camps was a series of battles in the mid-1980s between Amal and Palestinian groups. The Druze-oriented Progressive Socialist Party (PSP) and Hezbollah supported the Palestinians while Syria backed Amal.

==== First battle: May 1985 ====
Although most of the Palestinian guerrillas were expelled during the 1982 Israeli invasion, Palestinian militias began to regain their footing after the Israeli withdrawal firstly from Beirut, then Sidon and Tyre. Syria viewed this revival with some anxiety: though in the same ideological camp, Damascus had little control over most Palestinians organizations and was afraid that the build-up of Palestinian forces could lead to a new Israeli invasion. Moreover, Syria's minority Alawite regime was never comfortable with the Sunni militias in Lebanon, traditionally aligned with Egypt and Iraq. In Lebanon, Shia-Palestinian relations had been very tense since the late 1960s. After the multinational force withdrew from Beirut in February 1984, Amal and the PSP took control of west Beirut and Amal built a number of outposts around the camps (in Beirut but also in the south). On April 15, 1985, Amal and the PSP attacked the Al-Mourabitoun, the main Lebanese Sunni militia and the closest ally of the PLO in Lebanon. The Al-Mourabitoun forces were vanquished after a week of heavy fighting and their leader, Ibrahim Kulaylat was sent into exile. On May 19, 1985, heavy fighting erupted between Amal and the Palestinians for the control of the Sabra, Shatila and Burj el-Barajneh camps (all in Beirut). Despite its efforts, Amal could not take the control of the camps. The death toll remains unknown, with estimates ranging from a few hundreds to a few thousands. This and heavy political pressure from the Arab League led to a cease-fire on June 17.

==== Second battle: May 1986 ====
The situation remained tense and fights occurred again in September 1985 and March 1986. On May 19, 1986, heavy fighting erupted again. Despite new armaments provided by Syria, Amal could not take control of the camps. Many cease-fires were announced, but most of them did not last more than a few days. The situation began to cool after Syria deployed some troops on June 24, 1986.

==== Third battle September 1986 ====
There was tension in the south, an area where Shi'as and Palestinians were both present. This unavoidably led to frequent clashes. On September 29, 1986, fighting erupted at the Rashidiyye refugee camp near Tyre. The conflict immediately spread to Sidon and Beirut. Palestinian forces managed to occupy the Amal-controlled town of Maghdouché on the eastern hills of Sidon to open the road to Rashidiyye. Syrian forces helped Amal and Israel launched air strikes against PLO position around Maghdouche. A cease-fire was negotiated between Amal and pro-Syrian Palestinian groups on December 15, 1986, but it was rejected by Yasser Arafat's Fatah. Fatah tried to appease the situation by giving some of its positions to Hezbollah and to the Al-Mourabitoun. The situation became relatively calm for a while, but the shelling of the camps continued. In Beirut, a blockade of the camps led to a dramatic shortage of food and medications inside the camps. Palestinian gunners in the Chouf shelled Shia districts. In mid-February 1987, fighting broke out between Amal and the PLA and PSP militias which resulted in Amal being driven out of large portions of West Beirut. Consequently, the Syrian army returned to West Beirut, February 21, 1987, after an absence of three and a half years. On April 7, 1987, Amal finally lifted the siege and handed its positions around the camps to the Syrian army. According to the New York Times (March 10, 1992, citing figures from the Lebanese police), 3,781 were killed in the fighting.

==== February 1988 ====
On February 17, 1988, Lt. Col William R. Higgins, American Chief of the UNTSO observer group in Lebanon, was abducted from his UN vehicle between Tyre and Nakara after a meeting with Abd al-Majid Salah, Amal's political leader in southern Lebanon. It soon became "clear that Sheikh al-Musawi, the commander to Hezbollah's Islamic Resistance, had been personally responsible for the abduction of Lt. Col Higgins in close cooperation with both Sheikh Abdul Karim Obeid, the local commander of Hizballah's military wing, and Mustafa al-Dirani, the former head of Amal's security service." This is seen as a direct challenge to Amal by Hezbollah, and Amal responds by launching an offensive against Hezbollah in the south where it "scores decisive military victories ... leading to the expulsion of a number of Hizballah clergy to the Beqqa". In Beirut's southern suburbs however, where fighting also raged, Hizballah was much more successful. "[E]lements within Hizballah and the Iranian Pasdaran established a joint command to assassinate high-ranking Amal officials and carry out operations against Amal checkpoints and centers."

By May, Amal had suffered major losses, its members were defecting to Hezbollah, and by June, Syria had to intervene militarily to rescue Amal from defeat. In January 1989, a truce in the "ferocious" fighting between Hizballah and Amal was arranged by Syrian and Iranian intervention. "Under this agreement, Amal's authority over the security of southern Lebanon [is] recognized while Hizballah [is] permitted to maintain only a nonmilitary presence through political, cultural, and informational programmes."

== Disbandment ==
Upon the end of the war in October 1990, Amal militia forces operating in the Capital and the Beqaa were ordered by the Lebanese Government on March 28, 1991, to disband and surrender their heavy weaponry by April 30 as stipulated by the Taif Agreement, a decision that came a few months after the Movement's leadership had already announced the dissolution of its own military force. The Sixth Brigade was re-integrated into the structure of the Lebanese Armed Forces (LAF) whilst an additional 2,800 ex-Amal militiamen joined the re-formed Lebanese Army in September of the following year.

Despite the order to disarm, Amal guerrilla units in the south remained in place until the final Israeli pull-out in May 2000 and the subsequent collapse of the "Security Belt". One of their last significant operations was the Ansariya ambush on September 15, 1997, where Amal commandos under Hezbollah command successfully ambushed an Israeli Shayetet 13 naval commando force.

== Successor military wing ==
By 2006, Amal had a new unnamed military wing, which participated in the 2006 Lebanon War alongside Hezbollah.

Amal's military wing began participating in the 2023 Israel-Lebanon border clashes in November by launching strikes on Israeli military barracks; one of its members was later killed by Israeli shelling of the town of Rab Thalathine. Another fighter was killed in August by an Israeli strike on a car in the town of Khiam. This military wing, which has an elite unit called "Al-Abbas Force", has also participated in fighting against Israel's invasion of Lebanon in October 2024; two fighters from the Al-Abbas Force were killed in battles against the IDF.

== Weapons and equipment ==
Most of Amal's own weapons and equipment were provided by the PLO, Libya, Iran and Syria or pilfered from the Lebanese Armed Forces (LAF) and the Internal Security Forces (ISF) reserves after their collapse in January 1976. Additional weaponry, vehicles and other, non-lethal military equipments were procured in the international black market.

=== Small-arms ===
Amal militiamen were provided with a variety of small-arms, including MAT-49, Sa 25/26 and Crvena Zastava Automat M56 submachine guns, M1 Garand (or its Italian-produced copy, the Beretta Model 1952) and SKS semi-automatic rifles, AMD-65 assault carbines, CETME Model C, Heckler & Koch G3, FN FAL, M16A1, AK-47 and AKM assault rifles (other variants included the Zastava M70, Chinese Type 56, Romanian Pistol Mitralieră model 1963/1965, Bulgarian AKK/AKKS and former East German MPi-KMS-72 assault rifles). Several models of handguns were also used, including Colt Cobra .38 Special snub-nose revolvers, Tokarev TT-33, CZ 75, M1911A1, FN P35 and MAB PA-15 pistols. Squad weapons consisted of Heckler & Koch HK21, RPK, RPD, PK/PKM, Rheinmetall MG 3, FN MAG and M60 light machine guns, with heavier Browning M1919A4 .30 Cal, Browning M2HB .50 Cal and DShKM machine guns being employed as platoon and company weapons. FN FAL assault rifles equipped with telescopic sights were used for sniping.

Grenade launchers and portable anti-tank weapons consisted of M79 grenade launchers, M72 LAW and RPG-7 rocket launchers, whilst crew-served and indirect fire weapons included M2 60mm light mortars, 82-PM-41 82mm mortars and thirty 120-PM-43 (M-1943) 120mm heavy mortars, plus Type 56 75mm, B-10 82mm, B-11 107mm and M40A1 106mm recoilless rifles (often mounted on technicals). Soviet PTRS-41 14.5mm anti-tank rifles were used for heavy sniping.

=== Armored and transport vehicles ===
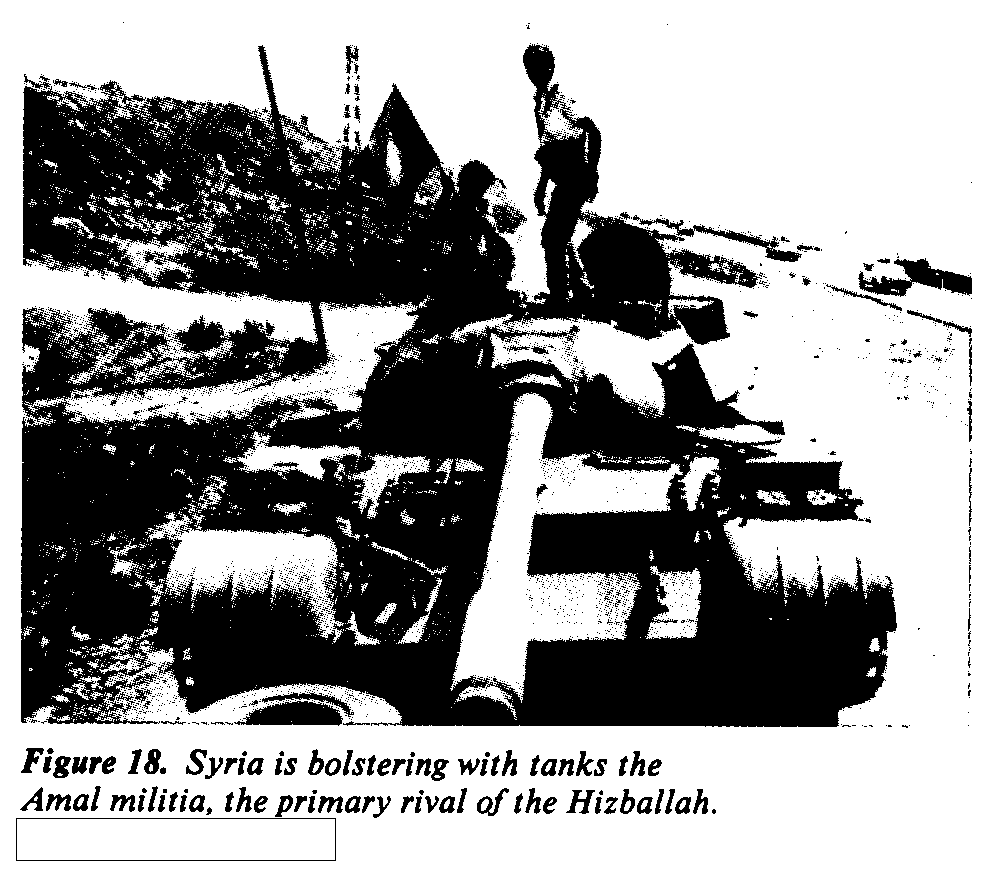
Amal fighters manning a T-55A tank provided by Syria, Beirut 1980s.

Amal's technicals' and gun trucks' fleet consisted mostly of M151A2 jeeps, Land Rover II-III, Santana Series III (Spanish-produced version of the Land-Rover series III), Morattab Series IV (Iranian-produced unlicensed version of the Land-Rover long wheelbase series III), Toyota Land Cruiser (J40/J42), Jeep Gladiator J20, GMC Sierra Custom K25/K30, Dodge D series (3rd generation), Chevrolet C-10/C-15 Cheyenne, Chevrolet C-20 Scottsdale and Chevrolet C/K 3rd generation light pickup trucks, and Chevrolet C-50 medium-duty, Dodge F600 medium-duty and GMC C4500 medium-duty trucks, and GMC C7500 heavy-duty trucks. These were partially supplanted in the 1980s by Volvo Laplander L3314A light utility vehicles, Dodge Ram (1st generation) pickups, Santana 88 Ligero Militar jeeps, Nissan 620 pickup trucks and Nissan Patrol 160-Series (3rd generation) pickups, Jeep CJ-5 and Jeep CJ-8 (Civilian versions of the Willys M38A1 MD jeep), and M35A2 2½-ton 6x6 cargo trucks.

The Sixth Brigade aligned an armoured battalion fielding Alvis Saladin armoured cars, AMX-13 light tanks, M48A5 main battle tanks, and three to four mechanized infantry battalions on M113, Alvis Saracen and VAB (4x4) armored personnel carriers. The collapse of the Fourth Brigade in February 1984 also allowed Amal to seize an additional number of Panhard AML-90 armoured cars, AMX-13 light tanks, and AMX-VCI and M113 APCs.

In addition, the well-equipped Beirut-based Amal regular forces also operated 30 or 50 Syrian-loaned T-55A MBTs, and two or three ex-PLO ZSU-23-4M1 Shilka SPAAG tracked vehicles seized from the Al-Mourabitoun in April 1985, whereas their guerrilla units fighting in the south of the country were able to add a few M113 Zelda and M3/M9 Zahlam half-tracks captured from the Israel Defense Forces (IDF) and their South Lebanon Army (SLA) proxies.

=== Artillery ===
Amal also fielded a powerful artillery corps equipped with Syrian-loaned Soviet 130 mm towed field gun M1954 (M-46) and eighteen 122 mm howitzer 2A18 (D-30) pieces, plus towed Type 63 107mm, truck-mounted BM-11 122mm and twenty BM-21 Grad 122mm multiple rocket launchers, whilst the Sixth Brigade aligned an artillery battalion equipped with US M114 155 mm howitzers. Soviet ZPU (ZPU-1, ZPU-2, ZPU-4) 14.5mm and ZU-23-2 23mm Anti-Aircraft autocannons (mounted on technicals, M35A2 trucks and M113 APCs) were employed in both air defense and direct fire supporting roles.

== Uniforms and insignia ==
Amal militiamen usually wore in the field a mix of military uniforms and western civilian clothes, though they were known to have worn a variety of battle dress, depending on whom they allied to and what other armed forces were occupying the Shia-populated areas where the movement operated in Southern Lebanon, West Beirut and the Bekaa Valley.

=== Fatigue clothing ===
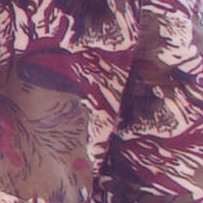
AMAL Pakistani Arid Brushtroke pattern.

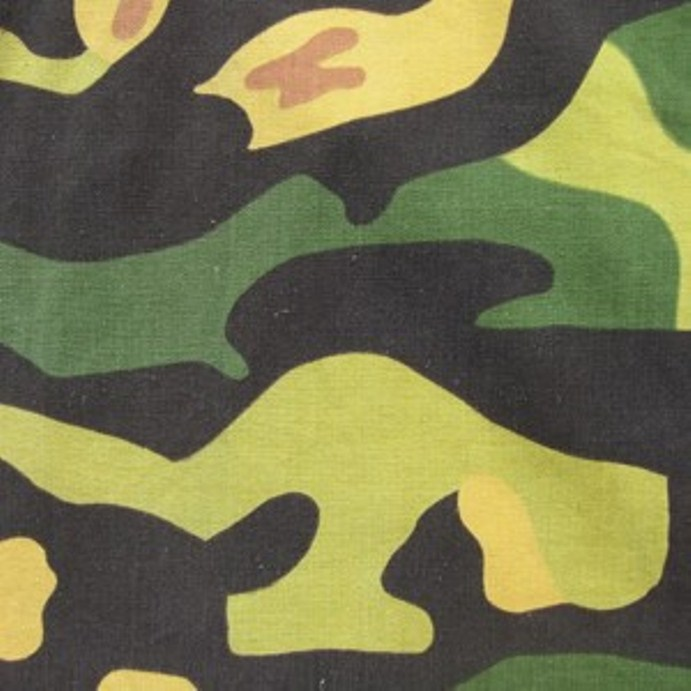
AMAL Czechoslovak Vz 60 "Salamander" (Mlok) pattern.

Amal regular forces adopted early on the Lebanese Army olive green fatigues (a special domestic variant of the US Army OG-107 cotton sateen utilities) as their standard field dress, though surplus military clothing such as olive green French Army Mle 1964 'Satin 300' fatigues, Syrian Army olive green fatigues and captured Israeli olive drab Uniform "B" (Hebrew: Madei Bet) fatigues were used as well.

Camouflage uniforms consisted of Syrian or PLO Lizard horizontal and vertical patterns' fatigues, Syrian copies of the Pakistani Arid Brushstroke (nicknamed "Wisp") fatigues, ex-PLO South Korean "turtle shell" (a.k.a. "geometric") and Czechoslovak Vz 60 "Salamander" (Mlok) patterns fatigues, and captured U.S. Woodland Battle Dress Uniforms (BDU) or locally produced cheap copies. T-shirts in US Highland pattern were sometimes worn.

Civilian or surplus military Parkas, Syrian-supplied olive green and camouflage US M-1965 field jackets, captured Israeli olive green Dubon Parkas and ex-PLO Iraqi copies of the olive-brown woollen Jordanian Commando Sweater (a.k.a. 'woolly-pully') provided with breast pockets and shoulder straps, were worn in cold weather.

=== Headgear ===
Usual headgear consisted of ex-Lebanese Army Baseball caps (a domestic version of the US Army OG-106 Baseball cap), complemented by US BDU caps and boonie hats in U.S. Woodland camouflage pattern, olive green or camouflage bucket hats, and even Soviet M-38 Field Hats in mustard khaki cotton (Russian: Panamanka). Black and midnight blue berets were worn French-style, pulled to the left, although some Amal militiamen wore them pulled to the right. Besides caps, hats and berets, fur-lined cloth bomber hats, civilian knitted woollen caps and military commando caps of various colours were used in the winter.

Cloth or fabric hoods with eye holes, rib-knit two-hole or three-hole balaclavas, transparent women's stockings and commercial white plastic face masks were worn by Amal militiamen to conceal identity; a black-and-white or red-and-white kaffiyeh could also be worn around the neck as a foulard.

=== Footwear ===
The black leather combat boots worn by Amal regulars came from Lebanese Army stocks, the US Army M-1967 model with DMS "ripple" pattern rubber sole and the French Army "Rangers" BM65 (French: Rangers de l'Armée Française BM65) with double-buckle ankle cuff, or were provided by the PLO and the Syrians, complemented by Israeli black or brown leather paratrooper boots captured from the Lebanese Forces (LF). Low-top and high-top Pataugas khaki or olive canvas-and-rubber patrol boots were also used, either obtained from PLO stocks or provided by Syria. Several models of civilian sneakers or "trainers" and "chucks", black or brown leather laced low shoes, boat shoes and loafers, commercial plastic or rubber slides and flip-flops, and leather sandals were widely used by Amal militiamen.

=== Helmets and body armour ===
In the field, Amal infantrymen could be found wearing a variety of helmet types, consisting of US M-1 and French M1951 NATO (French: Casque Mle 1951 OTAN) steel helmets captured from the Lebanese Army, and Israeli Orlite OR-201 (Model 76) ballistic helmets seized from the LF or the South Lebanon Army (SLA). Amal armoured crewmen, depending on the vehicle they manned, wore Soviet TSh-4M black tanker's padded cloth helmets provided by Syria or ex-Lebanese Army US fibreglass "bone dome" Combat Vehicle Crewman (CVC) T-56-6 helmets and CVC DH-132 helmets in ballistic Kevlar. Some Amal fighters also made use of captured flak jackets, either the Ballistic Nylon US M-1952/69 'Half-collar' version or the Israeli-produced Kevlar Rabintex Industries Ltd Type III RAV 200 Protective Vest (Hebrew: "Shapats"), in turn obtained from the Lebanese Army, LF and SLA.

=== Accoutrements ===
The web gear used by Amal militiamen was varied, consisting on the US Army M-1956 load-carrying equipment (LCE) in khaki cotton canvas and the all-purpose lightweight individual carrying equipment (ALICE) in OG Nylon captured from the Lebanese Army, ChiCom Type 56 AK and Type 56 SKS chest rigs in khaki or olive green cotton fabric for the AK-47 assault rifle and the SKS semi-automatic rifle, Soviet three-cell and four-cell AK-47 magazine pouches in khaki or OG canvas, and captured IDF olive green Nylon Ephod Combat Vests; several variants of locally made, multi-pocket chest rigs and assault vests in camouflage cloth, khaki and OG canvas or Nylon were also widely used. Anti-tank teams issued with the RPG-7 rocket launcher received the correspondent Soviet rocket bag models in khaki canvas, the Gunner Backpack 6SH12, the Assistant Gunner Backpack and the Munitions Bag 6SH11; Polish and East German versions in rubberized canvas were employed as well.

=== Insignia ===
Amal Movement logo, worn on brassards and printed on T-shirts.

The Amal Militia apparently never devised a system of rank, branch or unit insignia of their own, although its personnel did wear a variety of field recognition signs. An Islamic green cloth, fabric or canvas brassard of roughly triangular shape and attached to a shoulder strap, bearing the round printed or embroidered full-colour Amal Movement logo was worn on either the upper left shoulder or the right shoulder, whilst a red brassard appears to have been given to the members of the Amal Military Police corps. White, olive green and black T-shirts printed with either the Amal logo, Amal militia unit and sub-unit insignia or the Movement leaders' effigy were commonly worn by Shiite fighters.

Amal militiamen often wore a small, plastified tag bearing the full-colour portrait of Iman Musa al-Sadr hung on a black cord around the neck; period photos also show that Amal fighters applied rectangular-shaped printed paper stickers bearing the image of al-Sadr to their assault rifles' stocks.

== In popular culture ==
The Amal militia has made a few major TV and film appearances, most notably in the 1988 American made-for-television drama film The Taking of Flight 847: The Uli Derickson Story, which was based on the Trans World Airlines Flight 847 hijacking incident in June 1985. They are also featured in the 1990 American military action film Navy SEALs and in the 2001 American action thriller film Spy Game, appearing on several street fighting scenes set during the War of the Camps in Beirut.

Amal troops also appear on 1980s archived TV news footage in the episode of the 2018 Al Jazeera English War Hotels documentary series dedicated to the Commodore Hotel in west Beirut.

== See also ==
- Al-Mourabitoun
- Battle of the Hotels
- Coastal War
- Front of Patriotic and National Parties
- Lebanese Civil War
- Lebanese Communist Party
- Lebanese Forces (militia)
- Le Commodore Hotel Beirut
- List of extrajudicial killings and political violence in Lebanon
- List of weapons of the Lebanese Civil War
- Mostafa Chamran
- Mountain War
- People's Liberation Army (Lebanon)
- Popular Guard
- South Lebanon Army
- War of Brothers
- War of the Camps
- 3rd Infantry Brigade (Lebanon)
