= People's Liberation Army (Lebanon) =

Military wing of the Druze Progressive Socialist Party

People's Liberation Army – PLA جيش التحرير الشعبي
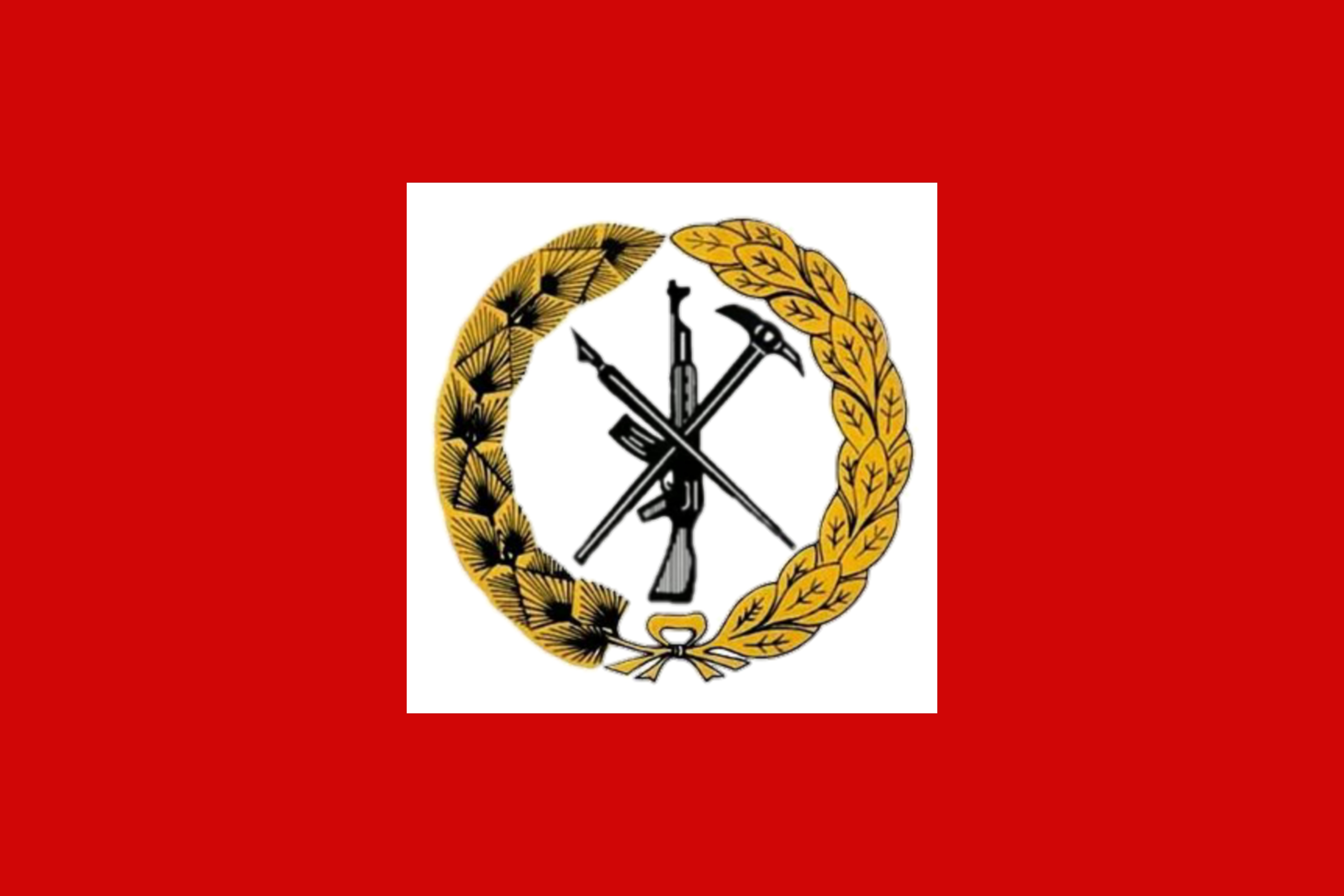
- People's Liberation Army (PLA) flag
- Leaders: Kamal Jumblatt; Walid Jumblatt
- Dates active: 1958; 1975–1994
- Headquarters: Baakline (Chouf District)
- Active regions: Chouf District, Aley District, West Beirut, Northern Lebanon, Southern Lebanon
- Ideology: Socialism; Anti-imperialism; Druze minority interests Secularism
- Status: Disbanded
- Size: 17,000 fighters
- Part of: Progressive Socialist Party; Lebanese National Movement; Lebanese National Resistance Front
- Wars: 1958 Lebanon crisis; Lebanese Civil War; South Lebanon conflict (1985–2000)

The People's Liberation Army – PLA (Arabic: جيش التحرير الشعبي, romanized: Jayish at-Taḥrīr ash-Shaʿabī), also known as the Armée populaire de libération (APL) in French or Forces of the Martyr Kamal Jumblatt (Arabic: قوات الشهيد كمال جنبلاط, romanized: Quwwāt ash-Shahīd Kamāl Junblāṭṭ), was the military wing of the left-wing Druze Progressive Socialist Party (PSP), which fought in the Lebanese Civil War. The PSP and its militia were members of the Lebanese National Movement (LNM) from 1975 to 1982 and its successor, the Lebanese National Resistance Front (LNRF) from 1983 to 1990.

== Emblem ==
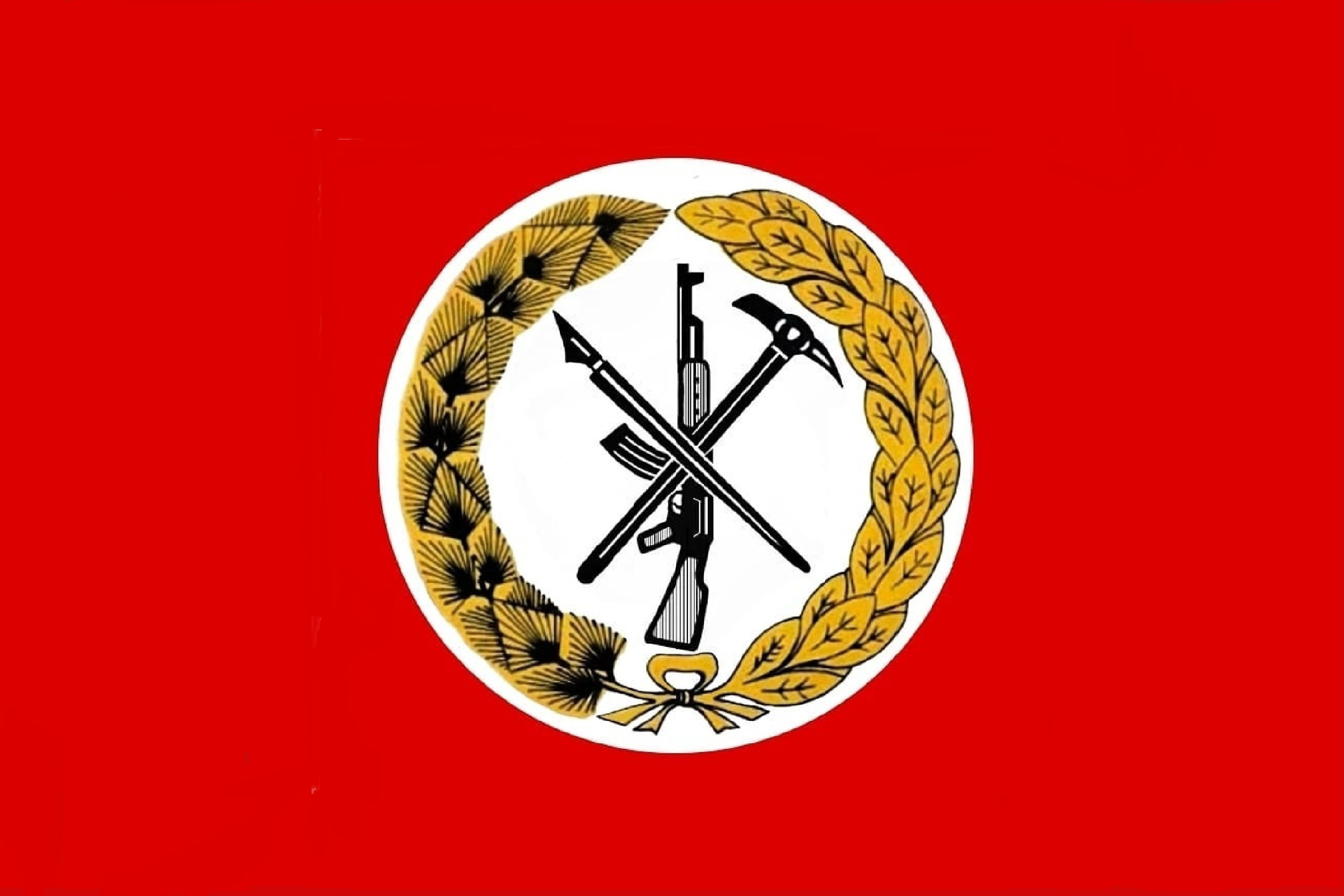
People's Liberation Army flag (alternate version) 1977-1994

First adopted in 1976 and modified in 1977–78, the PLA official emblem consisted of a red flag with a white square on the centre, featuring a crossed dip pen and pickaxe superimposed on an AK-47 assault rifle in the middle standing upwards, all in silver, inserted on a golden circular wreath, the latter consisting of two interlocking branches and leaves of the Oak tree and the Lebanese Cedar tree.

== Origins ==
Although the PSP was officially a secular political party, its military wing was not only well-organized, but also one of the largest sectarian militias in Lebanon. It was first founded unofficially by the Party's president, the za'im (political boss) Kamal Jumblatt at the height of the 1958 Civil War with a strength of about 1,000–2,000 militiamen, which fought alongside the Pan-Arab/leftist anti-government forces against the Lebanese Army, and the pro-government conservative Christian and Muslim militias in Beirut and the Chouf District.

Disbanded upon the conclusion of the war, the PSP was left without an official paramilitary branch until the early 1970s, when – despite Kamal Jumblatt's initial reluctance to engage in paramilitarism – the Party's leadership board decided to quietly raise a new militia force with the help of the Palestine Liberation Organization or PLO (mainly from Fatah, PFLP and DFLP) in response to the Christian rightist Parties' own clandestine military build-up. Initial progress was slow, however, since the PSP under Kamal Jumblatt had no regular militiamen, but relied mostly on its Druze irregulars, which could be mobilised when needed. Because of the secrecy surrounding the formation of its military wing, the PSP was only able to gather 175-185 militiamen, most of them drawn from an existing Boy Scout organization, and each recruit had to finance himself. The weapons that these fighters used, usually a left-over from the PLO or a regional country, were obsolete, somewhat basic and in short supply, as Jumblatt had neither the means nor the will to invest heavily in his new militia.

From 1971 to 1974, this initial intake of young recruits was trained by a Druze medical doctor and former officer in the Mexican Special Forces, Colonel Ghazi Karami, who manned an advanced Commando course at a PSP-run secret training camp set up near Choueifat in the Aley District. Eventually, the group of 185 highly trained fighters that graduated from the course in 1974 with excellent military skills and tactics went to provide the founding cadre for the PSP's first unconventional warfare unit, which was given the title Popular Commandos Forces – PCF (Arabic: قوات الكوماندوز الشعبية | Quwwat al-Kumanduz al-Sha'abya). Led by Ramez Assaf, they first saw action in Beirut during the Battle of the Hotels in 1975-76. Under Kamal Jumblatt's leadership, the PSP was a major element in the Lebanese National Movement (LNM) alliance, which supported the recognition of Lebanon's Arab identity and sympathised with the Palestinians. When the Lebanese Civil War broke out in April 1975, as a member of the LNM the PSP and its small PCF militia were active founders of the movement's military wing, the Joint Forces (LNM-JF).

On 7 August 1976, following an open appeal by Kamal Jumblatt urging Lebanese Muslim youths to join the LNM-JF militias, the PSP's own military wing was re-organized and expanded to a force not exceeding 400 men, being officially established as the Popular Liberation Forces – PLF (Arabic: قوات التحرير الشعبية | Quwwat al-Tahrir al-Sha'abya). In the process, the PLF absorbed the PCF which was integrated in the newly created structure as the Tanukh Brigade (Arabic: لواء تنوخ | Liwa' Tanukh). The name 'Tanukh' clearly indicated Kamal Jumblatt's wish to link his current political venture to that of the early Druze Tanukhid settlers tasked with defending the Lebanese coast against foreign invasions during the Crusades. In any case, this brigade was the basis for many of the fighting units that were formed in PSP-affiliated areas, especially those engaged in combat at this early stage. The PLF continued to expand and by early 1977, it mustered 2,500–3,000 lightly armed fighters drawn from the Druze and Shia Muslim communities of the Chouf, although other sources place its numbers as high as 5,000.

Nevertheless, it was not until the death of Kamal Jumblatt in 1977, that a process to build a real military structure was set in motion in collaboration with the Soviet Union and Syria. On a military level both the Soviets and the Syrians took the PSP under their wing and gradually transformed its PLF militia into a proper army, with modern training and unrestricted access to weaponry when needed. The transformation of the PSP militia into an organised fighting unit was entrusted to Raja Harb, a Druze Lebanese Army Lieutenant (later, Major), who supervised training programs and military equipment deliveries to PLF units in Lebanon. All these developments allowed Walid Jumblatt to finally declare on 1 June 1978 the founding of the People's Liberation Army – Forces of the Martyr Kamal Jumblatt (PLA – FMKL). The Lebanese Druze, under the leadership of Walid Jumblatt (who combined the PSP's presidency with that of the LNM at the time), now had an army capable of confronting any serious challenge, especially the perceived threat that was looming with the rise of Bashir Gemayel and his newly unified Lebanese Forces (LF) Christian militia backed by Israel.

== Military structure and organization ==
In 1975–77 the PLA was a predominantly infantry force, with the basic combat unit being a militia group of about 50 men, in some cases drawn entirely from one extended family, loosely organized into larger company-sized formations provided with light weapons drawn from PLO stocks or pilfered from LAF and ISF barracks. There was no strict chain of command and no set hierarchy existed in the PLA, although Walid Jumblatt usually delegated responsibilities to commanders at various echelons in the militia's organization. In fact, PLA unit, sector or corps' commanders were chosen by consensus as a result of courage displayed in combat, leadership ability, or family ties. Many of these selected commanders had formal military training, being former Lebanese Army officers who had joined the Druze PSP militia when the LAF split under confessional lines in January 1976.

After suffering casualties during the Israeli invasion of Lebanon of June 1982, the PLA was quietly re-organized late that year by Walid Jumblatt, who turned it into a disciplined fighting force provided with Soviet-made armoured vehicles and artillery. Headquartered at the Druze town of Baakline in the Chouf, the PSP militia by 1983 aligned 16,000–17,000 troops, consisting of 5,000–6,000 uniformed regulars backed by 12,000 male and female reservists, staffed and led by a qualified, professionally trained officer corps. Whereas the PLA regular fighters were organized into conventionally structured companies and battalions, the PSP militia own reserve was based on a system of interlocking irregular village defense companies arranged so that each fighter defended his own home. This arrangement was particularly suited to the clan-based Druze community, where allegiance usually is based on the individual's perception of family interests. During the heavy clashes occurred in September 1983 in the Chouf district, the Druze village-based reserve companies and the PLA's regular battalions proved able to coordinate their activities, holding successfully their ground against both the Lebanese Army and the Christian LF militia.

In addition to mobilizing Druze civilian volunteers with no prior military experience, the PLA also absorbed many Druze regular soldiers which had served with the Lebanese Arab Army (LAA) upon its forceful disbandment in 1977-78, being subsequently enlarged in the wake of the Mountain War with the inclusion of a number of Druze officers, NCOs and enlisted men from the Lebanese Army's Fourth Brigade after its disintegration in February 1984. During that conflict, the PLA also received the active support of the 1,800 men-strong, primarily Druze Eleventh Brigade commanded by Colonel Amin Qadi, stationed at Hammana and Beiteddine. Although its membership and command structure was predominantly Druze, the PLA did included a number of Sunnis and Shi'ites in their ranks; most Druze recruits continued to come from the Mountain and, until the return of the Syrian Army in 1987, from the Sanayeh (Kantari District) and the seafront quarters of West Beirut.

Under the command of Major Raja Harb, from 1978 until the end of the civil war in 1990, the PSP militia annually had about 150 men in the USSR, at the two main training facilities run by the Soviet Main Directorate of International Military Cooperation, the Higher Military Combined Command Engineering School of Air Defense and the Higher United Military School in the Odessa, and the Simferopol United Military School on the Crimea. In the winter of 1978, the first group of 52 Druze officer cadets arrived in the USSR, to be exposed to various military courses ranging from the School of Infantry to the more advanced Command and Staff College. Following their return, these skilled fighters formed the cadres in the PSP training camps set up throughout the Chouf District, where they transferred the skills they had acquired to a large number of future combatants. On some of these camps, the Soviet-trained Druze instructors were assisted by several Syrian military advisors sent by Hafez al-Assad to support his new ally Walid Jumblatt. Other Druze officer cadets received their instruction in a PSP-run Military School set up at the town of Debbiyeh, also in the Chouf.

In 1986-87, Walid Jumblatt agreed to lend 2,000 PSP/PLA troops to the Libyan President Colonel Muammar Gaddafi to fight alongside the Libyan Army in the Chadian–Libyan conflict, as part of a aid package deal that included much-needed financing for the PSP troops in Lebanon. In the end, only a small contingent of 120 Druze officers and enlisted men was actually sent to Libya, but they were never used in their intended role of fighting the Chadians; instead, the PLA contingent underwent a regimented training programme in basic infantry, armour, and artillery tactics, manned by Soviet and East German advisors. Upon the conclusion of their instruction cycle, they were provided by the Libyans with a considerable haul of Soviet-made heavy weapons, including tanks, tracked and wheeled APCs, MBRLs, and SPAAGs, before returning to Lebanon by ship to the PSP-controlled port of Jieh in the Iqlim al-Kharrub coastal enclave.

=== Field organization ===
PLA armored, "Commando", infantry, and artillery units were organized into independent formations deployed to a specific area of military operations or "Sector" (Arabic: Qitay), seven of which were formed upon the establishment of the Popular Liberation Forces (PLF) in August 1976, and doubled as Regional Commands. Each "Sector" was assigned a "Commando" company and an infantry company, both of which were raised locally and grouped together into a battalion- or regimental-sized combat task-force termed a "Brigade" (Arabic: Liwa'), plus an attached Military Police Brigade (actually, a Battalion). By February 1984, the PLA aligned eight such "Brigades" that fielded eight "Commando" companies and eight assorted infantry companies, and eight Military Police "Brigades", with their respective "Sectors" being organized as follows:

- The Beirut Sector (Arabic: قطاع بيروت | Qitay Bayrut) – Beirut Brigade (Arabic: لواء بيروت | Liwa' Bayrut)
- The Aley Sector (Arabic: قطاع عاليه | Qitay Alyh) – Aley Brigade (Arabic: لواء عاليه | Liwa' Alyh)
- The Choueifat Sector (Arabic: قطاع الشويفات | Qitay al-Shuwayfat) – Choueifat Brigade (Arabic: لواء الشويفات | Liwa' al-Shuwayfat)
- The North Sector (Arabic: قطاع الشمال | Qitay al-Shamal) – North Brigade (Arabic: لواء الشمال | Liwa' al-Shamal)
- The South Sector (Arabic: قطاع الجنوب | Qitay al-Janub) – South Brigade (Arabic: لواء الجنوب | Liwa' al-Janub)
- The Beqaa Sector (Arabic: قطاع البقاع | Qitay al-Biqaa) – Beqaa Brigade (Arabic: لواء البقاع | Liwa' al-Biqaa)
- The Tripoli Sector (Arabic: قطاع طرابلس | Qitay Tarabulus) – Tripoli Brigade (Arabic: لواء طرابلس | Liwa' Tarabulus)
- The Border Sector (Arabic: قطاع الحدود | Qitay al-Hudud) – Border Brigade (Arabic: لواء حرس الحدود | Liwa' Haras al-Hudud)

=== Branches of service ===
In 1983-84, Walid Jumblatt reestructed the PLA along conventional lines, comprising several branches of service and support units, organized into seven (subsequently augmented to nine) brigade-sized formations termed "Corps" (Arabic: Silah), whilst its branches and specialized technical services consisted of:

- The Infantry Corps (Arabic: سلاح المشاة | Silah al-Moushat) – First formed in 1978 and re-organized in 1984.
- The Armored Corps (Arabic: سلاح مدرع | Silah al-Moudara'a) – Established in 1984.
- The Artillery Corps (Arabic: سلاح المدفعية | Silah al-Madfa'aiya) – Established in 1984.
- The Anti-Aircraft Corps (Arabic: سلاح مضاد للطائرات | Silah Moudadoun lil Tayirat) – Established in 1984.
- The Rocket Corps (Arabic: سلاح الصواريخ | Silah al-Sawarikh) – Established in 1984.
- The Signal Corps (Arabic: فيلق الإشارة | Faylaq al-Ichara) – Established in 1984.
- The Logistics Corps (Arabic: سلاح اللوجستيات | Silah al-luwjustayat) – Established in 1984.
- The Engineering and Support Regiment (Arabic: فوج الهندسة والدعم | Fawj al-Hindasat Waldem) – Established in 1984.
- The Security Police Corps (Arabic: فيلق شرطة الأمن | Faylaq Shurtat al-Amn) – The PLA regular provost corps, established in 1984, which served both as Military Police and as a Gendarmerie in Druze-controlled areas to maintain law and order.

=== Elite units ===
- The Tanukh Brigade – PLA "Commando" and Special Operations unit specialized in unconventional warfare.
- The Jal el Bahr "Commando" Company (Arabic: شركة جل البحر كوماندوز | Sharikat Jal el-Bahr Kumanduz) – Formed in 1978 and based at Jal el Bahr in the Ain el-Mreisseh seafront quarter of Dar el-Mreisseh district in West Beirut, this Soviet-trained "Commando" company included a Combat Swimmer and Maritime Special Operations detachment, specialized in seaborne infiltration and reconnaissance.
- The 1st Naval Regiment (Arabic: أول فوج بحري | Awal Fawj Bahriin)
- The War of 1958 Veterans' association (Arabic: حرب 1958 جمعية المحاربين القدامى | Harb 1958 Jameiat al-Muharibin al-Qudama'a) – Also known as the Rebels of 58 (Arabic: متمردو 58 | Mutamaridu 58), this reserve unit comprised elderly Druze irregulars who had previously fought in the 1958 Civil War and were engaged in the Mountain War in 1983-84.
- The Forces of Abu-Ibrahim (Arabic: قوات ابو ابراهيم | Quwwat Abu Ibrahim) – Contingent of Druze fighting clerics (Sheikhs) that fought in the Mountain War. On 14 February 1984, in what was dubbed "Operation Sayyid Abdallah al-Tanukhi", the Druze Sheikhs participated alongside PLA regulars in the attack that seized all the LF and Lebanese Army positions in the Shahhar-El-Gharbi region southeast of Beirut in Mount Lebanon and liberated the Mausoleum of Sayyid Abdallah al-Tanukhi.

=== Military facilities ===
- PLA "Commando" School (Choueifat, Aley District) – Established earlier in 1971, it was primarily tasked of training the PLA's "Commando" troops.
- PLA Military School (Debbiyeh, Chouf District) – Main training facility of the PLA, which housed its Military Academy to train Officer cadets, the Non-commissioned officer (NCO) School and the Military Police Academy.
- Jal el Bahr Barracks (Dar el-Mreisseh district, West Beirut) – Established in 1978 and allocated in an unfinished apartment building at the Jal el Bahr seafront quarter, this was the main PLA depot in the Lebanese capital, and the headquarters of the Jal el Bahr "Commando" Company.
- Saïd el-Khateeb Barracks (Hammana, Baabda District) – Headquarters of the Lebanese Army's Druze Eleventh Brigade.
- Maasraiti vehicle park (Aley District) – Central parking area where the PLA kept most of its armoured and transport vehicles.
- PLA Engineering and repair depot (Tarchich, Baabda District) – Run by the Engineering and Support Regiment, it housed the PLA's main repair and maintenance wokshops.

== List of PLA Commanders ==
- Kamal Jumblatt (1975–1977)
- Walid Jumblatt (1977–1990)

=== PLA Junior Commanders ===
- Colonel Ghazi Karami
- Lieutenant Colonel Sharif Fayad
- Major Raja Harb
- Major Anwar al-Fatayri – PLA's Commissioner for Mobilisation.
- Riyad Taqi al-Din
- Ramez Assaf – Commander of the PLA Tanukh "Commando" Brigade.
- Saleh al-Deek – Deputy Commander of the Popular Liberation Forces in the Aley Sector.
- Hatem Bou Kheir – Commander of the PLA Jal el Bahr "Commando" Company in West Beirut.
- Ghanem Tarabay – Commander of the PLA forces in the Maten region.
- Fadi al-Ghraizi – Commander of the PLA forces in the Jurd region.
- Toufic Barakat
- Alaaeddine Terro
- Issam Aintrazi (a.k.a. 'Abu Said') – Commander of the Beirut Sector.
- Haitham al-Jurdy (a.k.a. 'Abu al-Shahid') – Commander of the Choueifat Sector.
- Jamal Saab
- Hussein Kerbaj
- Raja Fakhreddin
- Ramzi Al-Rayess – Commander of the Aley Sector.
- Kamil Mahmoud – Head of the security apparatus of PSP President Walid Jumblatt.
- Nadim Bou Harfouch
- Hassan al-Beaini – Commander of the PLA Security Police Corps.
- Mohamad Awad – Commander of the Arab al-Maslakh company of the PLA Security Police Corps.
- Hussein al-Khatib Bibi – Deputy Commander of the Arab al-Maslakh company of the PLA Security Police Corps.
- Jamal Ammar (a.k.a. 'Abu Ammar') – subordinate unit Commander of the PLA Security Police Corps.
- Zouhair Bou Chahine

== Administrative organization and illegal activities ==
The stronghold of the PSP/PLA laid in the Jabal Barouk area within the Chouf, which they turned into a semi-autonomous Canton in the early 1980s, known unofficially as the 'Druze Mountain' (Arabic: Jabal al-Duruz). Centred at the Druze town of Baakline – the PSP's political and military HQ – the canton comprised the Aley and Chouf Districts, including the historic towns of Moukhtara (the Jumblatt family's feudal seat near Beiteddine), Deir al-Qamar, and Bhamdoun, and the Iqlim al-Kharrub coastal enclave south of Beirut, which was added to the canton in March 1984. At west Beirut, the PLA had since 1976-77 a presence at the Ain el-Mreisseh seafront quarters of Dar el-Mreisseh district and the Corniche el-Mazraa of the Msaytbeh district, and controlled since May 1985 the Druze-populated Karakol el-Druze quarter, parts of the Hamra district and a large portion of Rue Jabal el-Arab in the Watta el-Msaytbeh quarter, the latter a small Druze street that housed the PSP's main political offices in the capital city.

From the Israeli withdrawal from the Chouf in 1983 to the end of the civil war in 1990, the PSP ran a highly effective and well-organized civil service, the "Civilian Administration of the Mountain" (CAM or CAOM), in the areas under its control (the Chouf and Aley Districts). The CAM was set up on 1 October 1983 at Beiteddine, headed by an eight-man supreme council that included a central committee and a general congress. Its own 23 bureaus staffed by 3,000 public employees provided everything from education to medical care and also employed 2,000 seasonal workers in agricultural and industrial projects in the Chouf.

To finance the administration, a Druze-run Holding, the COGECO group, was made responsible for running illegal activities at the clandestine ports of Khalde and Jieh in the Iqlim al-Kharrub coastal enclave, which included the importation of fuel from Iran, drug-trafficking and gambling by a network of PSP-run Hotels and illegal Casinos. Additional revenues were generated by leaving tolls on the transit trade of agricultural products and other goods at a number of in-land PLA road checkpoints, whilst the expatriated Druze community in the United States provided financial support.

Beiteddine was also the home of the PSP/PLA media services, responsible for editing its official newspaper, "The News" (Arabic: Al-Anba'a) and operated since February 1984 their own radio station, the "Voice of the Mountain" (Arabic: Iza'at Sawt al-Djabal) or "La Voix de la Montagne" in French.

== Controversy ==
Historically, the Druze in Lebanon managed to maintain for centuries a small, hardy community in the Chouf Mountains overlooking Beirut surrounded by a sea of potential enemies, both Christian and Muslim, and they have a reputation of being savage fighters known for their tenacious battle spirit. Their esprit de corps and brutal methods often convinced their opponents to flee, whilst those who decided to stay and fight never lived to tell the tale. However, the Lebanese Druze have also been amiable to whoever controls the Chouf region at any given time, and they were pragmatic with their dealings with foreign powers such as the Israelis, Americans and Syrians.

Long-standing enemies since the 1860s, the Druze have always been at odds with the Maronites, and acts of barbarism on both sides have bedevilled their ability to co-exist for centuries past. On 16 March 1977, the PSP leader Kamal Jumblatt was ambushed and killed in his car near Baakline in the Chouf by unidentified gunmen (allegedly, fighters from the pro-Syrian faction of the Syrian Social Nationalist Party or SSNP, acting in collusion with the Syrian military commander of the Mount Lebanon region, Colonel Ibrahim Houeijy); believing that the perpetrators were members of the predominately Christian Phalangist Kataeb Regulatory Forces (KRF) or Tigers Militias, PLF militiamen extracted swift retribution on the local Maronite population living in the intermixed towns and villages around Baakline. Despite the hasty dispatch on 17 March of 4,000 Syrian Army troops from the Arab Deterrent Force (ADF) to keep the peace in the Chouf, it is estimated that about 177–250 Maronite villagers were killed in reprisal actions (known as the Chouf massacres) at the towns of Moukhtara and Barouk, and at the villages of Mazraat el-Chouf, Maaser el-Chouf, Botmeh, Kfar Nabrakh, Fraydis, Machghara, Baadaran, Shurit, Ain Zhalta and Brih (St George's Church attack).

During the Mountain War, the predominantly Maronite Lebanese Forces militia occupied the Chouf District and tried to impose its authority by force, allegedly killing some 145 Druze civilians at Kfar Matta in September 1983 (although other sources allege that the death toll mounted to 200 people), followed by other killings at Sayed Abdullah, Salimeh and Ras el-Matn in the Baabda District. The Lebanese Forces command later accused the Druze PLA of committing "unprecedented massacres" in the Chouf – in order to deny support, cover or a visible community for the LF to protect, the Druze PSP/PLA leadership implemented a territorial cleansing policy to drain the Christian population from the region, during which Walid Jumblatt's militia forces overran between 31 August and 13 September 1983 sixty-two Maronite villages (including Bmarian, Bireh, Ras el-Matn, Maaser Beit ed-Dine, Chartoun, Ain el-Hour, Bourjayne, Fawara, and Maaser el-Chouf), slaughtered 1,500 people and drove another 50,000 out of their homes in the mountainous areas east and west of Beirut. In retaliation, some 127 Druze civilians were killed by LF militiamen between 5–7 September at the Shahhar region, Kfarmatta, Al-Bennay, Ain Ksour, and Aabey, where the LF also desecrated the tomb of a prominent Druze religious man. It is estimated that these 'tit-for-tat' killings ultimately led to the displacement of 20,000 Druze and 163,670 Christian villagers from the Chouf.

Like other Lebanese militias, the PLA was also involved in the assassination and kidnapping of political adversaries. In late 1976, Druze "Commandos" from the then Popular Liberation Forces (PLF) made an unsuccessful attempt on the life of Ahmad Safwan, the lider of the rival Shia Knights of Ali militia in West Beirut, which was enough to convince him to disband his own 400-strong militia shortly afterwards. In one occasion, on 23 September 1984 PLA fighters attempted to seize two Lebanese Army soldiers posted on sentry duty outside the Barbir Hospital in the Ouza'i district of West Beirut, though the latter managed to escape on foot towards the Army-manned Ojjeh checkpoint situated nearby at the Green Line, despite being pursued by their captors in a civilian car. Later on 8 September 1988, the deputy for Jezzine in the Lebanese Parliament, Dr Farid Serhal, was seized by PLA militiamen at a checkpoint also in the Ouza'i district of West Beirut and driven off to the Le Bristol Hotel Beirut in Rue Madame Curie, Ras Beirut, where he was temporarily held hostage.

== The PLA in the Lebanese Civil War ==
=== The early phase 1975–1982 ===
When the Lebanese Civil War began in April 1975, as a member of the LNM the Druze PSP was an active founder of its military wing, the Joint Forces (LNM-JF), and during the 1975–77 phase of the Lebanese Civil War, they were heavily committed in several battles. At the Battle of the Hotels in October 1975, the Popular Commandos Forces led by Ramez Assaf engaged Christian Kataeb Regulatory Forces (KRF) and Tigers Militia fighters, and later participated in the 'Spring Offensive' held against East Beirut and Mount Lebanon, battling the Lebanese Front militias at the Aley District in March–April 1976. At the former location, the PSP Popular Commandos Forces allied with the Lebanese Arab Army (LAA) battled Internal Security Forces (ISF) and Army of Free Lebanon's (AFL) units during an unsuccessful attempt to raid the AFL Headquarters at the Shukri Ghanem Barracks complex in the Fayadieh district.

Kamal Jumblatt's opposition to the Syrian military intervention of June 1976 in support of the official Lebanese Government and his adversaries of the Christian Lebanese Front militias, resulted in the PSP/PLF fighting Syrian Army troops at the Battle of Bhamdoun in the Chouf District. Between 13 and 17 October 1976, the Druze PSP's Popular Liberation Forces and their allies of the Sunni Al-Mourabitoun militia, the LAA and the PLO inflicted heavy losses on the Syrian 3rd Armoured Division when they tried to enter Bhamdoun by force. In 1977, PLF militia forces were also involved in the fierce fighting that engulfed the northern port city of Tripoli, clashing once again with the Christian Lebanese Front militias and the Lebanese Army.

=== The Mountain War 1983–84 ===
During the June 1982 Israeli invasion of Lebanon the PSP/PLA remained neutral, with Walid Jumblatt refusing to allow PLO units to operate within Druze territory and the PSP militia forces did not fought against the Israel Defense Forces (IDF), even though they supported their arch-enemies the Maronite Kataeb Party and its military arm, the Lebanese Forces (LF) militia. However, when President Amine Gemayel refused to grant the Druze community the expected political representation, Walid Jumblatt formed in response in July 1983 a Palestinian- and Syrian-backed military coalition, the Lebanese National Salvation Front (LNSF), that rallied several Lebanese Muslim and Christian parties and militias opposed to the U.S.-sponsored May 17 Agreement with Israel. Led by Jumblatt's PSP/PLA, the alliance gathered its rivals of the Druze Yazbaki clan, the Syrian Social Nationalist Party (SSNP), the Al-Mourabitoun and the Lebanese Communist Party (LCP)/Popular Guards, which fought the LF, the Lebanese Armed Forces (LAF) and the U.S. Marines contingent of the Multinational Force (MNF II) in the Chouf and Aley Districts and at West Beirut between September 1983 and February 1984.

During that conflict, the PSP/PLA clashed with the Lebanese Army's 4th infantry Brigade units reinforced by the 101st Ranger Battalion from the 10th Airmobile Brigade fighting desperately to retain their positions at Aabey, Kfar Matta, Ain Ksour, and Al-Bennay in the Aley District. Druze radio operators from the PSP/PLA Signal Corps managed to intercept, alter, and retransmit Lebanese Army radio communications, which allowed them to impersonate the LAF command in east Beirut by ordering 4th Infantry Brigade units to retreat to safer positions. Simultaneously, they ordered Lebanese Army's artillery units positioned at east Beirut to shell their own troops' positions in the western Chouf, which wreaked havoc among 4th Infantry Brigade units and forced them to fall back in disorder towards the coast while being subjected to friendly fire.

On 22 March 1984, Druze PLA militiamen backed by the Shia Amal militia drove their erstwhile allies of the Sunni Al-Mourabitoun militia and other smaller factions from their positions along the Green Line in the central districts of Beirut, ostensibly to prevent any violations of the ceasefire that came into effect after the decisive defeat of the Lebanese Army and the Lebanese Forces during the February 6 Intifada. Later on 24 July, the PLA battled again the Al-Mourabitoun militia at West Beirut, until the fighting was curbed by the intervention of the predominately Shia Sixth Brigade.

=== The War of the Camps 1985–87 ===
When the Coastal War broke out in March–April 1985, the PSP/PLA joined in a Syrian-backed coalition with the Popular Nasserist Organization (PNO), the Al-Mourabitoun and the Shi'ite Amal Movement, which defeated the Christian Lebanese Forces (LF) attempts to establish bridgeheads at Damour and Sidon. This alliance was short-lived, however, and as soon this battle ended, they joined in May another powerful coalition that gathered Amal and LCP/Popular Guards militia forces backed by Syria, the Lebanese Army, and anti-Arafat dissident Palestinian guerrilla factions gathered in the Palestinian National Salvation Front (PNSF) pitted against an alliance of pro-Arafat Palestinian refugee camps' PLO militias, the Al-Mourabitoun, the Communist Action Organization in Lebanon (OCAL), the Sixth of February Movement and the Kurdish Democratic Party – Lebanon (KDP-L). Although the PSP/PLA had stormed and seized the Al-Mourabitoun's radio and television studios in the Mahallat Abu Shaker Party headquarters' offices located near the Gamal Abdel Nasser Mosque in the Corniche El-Mazraa district earlier in March, and helped Amal in defeating the Al-Mourabitoun after a week of heavy fighting, they were reluctant to suppress altogether the PLO and KDP-L militias defending the refugee camps, preferring instead to stay out of the fight and remain militarily neutral in the subsequent conflict. Despite the PLA's "neutrality" posture, however, they did allowed the pro-Arafat Palestinian fighters to station their artillery on Druze-controlled areas in the Chouf.

Between July and November 1985, the PLA battled Amal for the control of some key positions in West Beirut previously held by the Multinational Force (MNF II), until a cease-fire agreement mediated by the Syrian military intelligence chief in Lebanon, Major general Ghazi Kanaan, was signed in late November. The terms of the agreement clearly favored Amal, which forced Walid Jumblatt on 24 November to publicly "reconsider" the military presence of his own PSP/PLA militia in the western sector of the Lebanese Capital.

In January 1987, PLA bodyguards provided protection to the Church of England's special envoy Terry Waite during his trip to West Beirut to negotiate the release of several British hostages then held by the Islamic Jihad Organization (IJO), though they were unable to prevent him of being tricked and abducted in turn by the IJO on 20 January. Besides personal protection, the PLA also provided security to the Commodore Hotel at Rue Baalbek on the Hamra district of West Beirut – which housed many foreign correspondents on assignment in the war-torn Lebanese Capital and served as an international news media center – and to the Soviet Embassy at Rue Mar Elias in the Ain el-Tineh quarter in Ras Beirut, also in West Beirut.

The following month, the PLA and Amal again turned against each other in what became known as the "War of the Flag". The conflict was started when a PLA fighter walked to the Channel 7 TV station (French: Télé Liban – Canal 7) building in the Tallet el-Khayat sector at Msaytbeh and replaced the Lebanese national flag hoisted there by the Druze five-coloured flag, which was interpreted by Amal militiamen as a deliberate act of provocation. A new round of brutal fighting soon spread throughout western Beirut, and although Amal forces initially managed to restore the Lebanese national flag on the Channel 7 building, they were subsequently overpowered by an alliance of PLA, LCP/Popular Guard and SSNP militias, and driven out of large portions of West Beirut. On 21-22 February, the week of fighting was ended by the arrival in West Beirut of 7,000 Syrian Commando troops under the command of Maj. Gen. Kanaan, assisted by Lebanese Internal Security Forces (ISF) gendarmes, who immediately closed over fifty militia "offices" and banned the carrying of weapons in public, detaining in the process many young men with beards suspected of being militiamen.

That same year, the PLA fought again the Lebanese Army in the Aley District, after the predominately Christian Maronite Fifth brigade had been deployed at the strategic town of Souk El Gharb to prevent Druze artillerymen from shelling the Lebanese Capital.

=== The later years 1988–1990 ===
During the 1989–1990 Liberation War, the PLA fought alongside pro-Syrian Lebanese Forces – Executive Command (LFEC) and Palestinian National Salvation Front (PNSF) militias backed by the Syrian Army against General Michel Aoun's Lebanese Army faction at the second battle of Souk El Gharb on 13 August 1989. The ground offensive was preceded by a massive and sustained Syrian artillery barrage on the positions held by Aounist troops, who repulsed the assault by inflicting some 20-30 casualties on the PSP/PLA attackers. Later on 13 October 1990, the PLA participated in the final offensive that brought a decisive end to the Lebanese Civil War, assisting Syrian Social Nationalist Party (SSNP), LFEC militiamen and Syrian troops in the capture of Gen. Aoun's HQ at the Presidential Palace in Baabda.

== Disbandment ==
Upon the end of the war in October 1990, PSP/PLA militia forces operating in Beirut and the Chouf were ordered by the Lebanese Government on 28 March 1991 to disband and surrender their heavy weaponry by 30 April as stipulated by the Taif Agreement to the Syrian Army and the Lebanese Armed Forces (LAF). Accordingly, the PLA's military hardware was collected and delivered to two central parks under Lebanese Army and Syrian supervision, one being located at the Beiteddine barracks where all the artillery pieces were stored, and the other at the Ain Zhalta barracks where the remaining equipment that included tanks, APCs, howitzers, anti-tank guns, tank transporters and their respective trailers, cargo trucks, and truck-mounted MBRLs was stored in turn.

A total of 3,300 former PLA militiamen, including 50 officers, requested integration into the structure of the LAF, but only 1,300 of these applicants were actually integrated. Some 800 ex-PLA fighters joined the re-formed Lebanese Army during the first stage, 160 of whom were attached to the Internal Security Forces (ISF) or the Lebanese Customs Administration. At a later stage, probably towards the beginning of 1992, an additional 500 Druze militiamen were integrated into the LAF and the ISF, with the process being completed by mid-1994.

Despite the order to disarm, some PSP/PLA guerrilla cells from the South Sector continued to operate in southern Lebanon against the Israel Defense Forces (IDF) and their South Lebanon Army (SLA) proxies in the "Security Belt" until the final Israeli pull-out in May 2000. The PLA is no longer active.

== Weapons and equipment ==
Besides Palestinian and Syrian backing, the collapse of the Lebanese Armed Forces (LAF) and Internal Security Forces (ISF) in January 1976 allowed the PSP/PLA to seize some weapons and vehicles from their barracks and police stations, though they received further military assistance from Libya, Iraq, Poland, Czechoslovakia, East Germany, and the USSR. Additional weaponry, vehicles and other, non-lethal military equipments were procured in the international black market.

=== Small-arms ===
PLA infantry units were provided with a variety of small arms, comprising Mauser Gewehr 98 and Karabiner 98k, Lee–Enfield SMLE Mk III, Pattern 1914 Enfield, Berthier 1907/15 – M16 Lebel and MAS-36 bolt-action rifles, MAS-49, M1 Garand (or its Italian-produced copy, the Beretta Model 1952) and SKS semi-automatic rifles, AMD-65 assault carbines, Heckler & Koch G3, FN FAL, M16A1, AK-47 and AKM assault rifles (other variants included the Zastava M70, Chinese Type 56, Romanian Pistol Mitralieră model 1963/1965, Bulgarian AKK/AKKS and former East German MPi-KMS-72 assault rifles). Submachine guns and shotguns, such as the PPSh-41, Beretta Model 12, Steyr MPi 69 and Winchester Model 1200 were employed by PLA bodyguard units.

Several models of handguns were used, such as Colt Cobra .38 Special snub-nose revolvers, Colt M1911A1, Tokarev TT-33, CZ 75, FN P35 and MAB PA-15 pistols. Squad weapons consisted of Bren Mk. I .303 (7.7mm), MG 34, RPK, RPD, PK/PKM, FN MAG and M60 light machine guns, with heavier Browning M1919A4 .30 Cal, Browning M2HB .50 Cal, SG-43/SGM Goryunov and DShKM machine guns being employed as platoon and company weapons. Soviet Dragunov SVD-63 sniper rifles and SIG SG 542 assault rifles equipped with telescopic sights were used for sniping.

Grenade launchers and portable anti-tank weapons included M203, M79, M72 LAW and RPG-7 rocket launchers whilst crew-served and indirect fire weapons comprised M1938 107 mm, 120-PM-38 (M-1938) 120 mm, MT-13 (M1943) 160 mm and 240 mm M-240 heavy mortars, plus DKB Grad-P 122 mm Light portable rocket systems, SPG-9 73 mm, B-10 82 mm, B-11 107 mm and M40A1 106 mm recoilless rifles (often mounted on technicals).

=== Armoured and transport vehicles ===
The PSP militia fielded by 1977 a small mechanized corps made of Panhard AML-90 and Staghound armoured cars, AMX-13 and M41A3 Walker Bulldog light tanks, M42A1 Duster SPAAGs, Panhard M3 VTT and M113 armored personnel carriers seized from the Lebanese Army in February 1976, plus a fleet of gun trucks and technicals. The latter consisted of US Willys M38A1 MD jeeps, Land-Rover series II-III, Toyota Land Cruiser (J40), Toyota Land Cruiser (J43), Chevrolet C-10/C-15 Cheyenne light pickup trucks, Chevrolet C/K 3rd generation and Jeep Gladiator J20 light pickup trucks, GMC K1500 and GMC C4500 medium-duty trucks, and M35A2 2½-ton (6x6) military trucks, equipped with heavy machine guns, recoilless rifles, and Anti-aircraft autocannons.

These vehicles were partially supplanted in the early 1980s by new models, such as Soviet UAZ-469 light utility vehicles, Jeep CJ-5 and Jeep CJ-8 (civilian versions of the Willys M38A1 MD jeep), Toyota Land Cruiser (J45), Toyota Land Cruiser (FJ70) 1984, Nissan Patrol 160-Series (3rd generation), Nissan 620 and Datsun 720 pickup trucks, whilst the disintegration of the Fourth Brigade allowed the PLA to seize a number of US M151A2 jeeps, M880/M890 Series CUCV, Chevrolet C-20 Scottsdale and Dodge Ram (1st generation) pickup trucks, and M35A2 2½-ton cargo trucks, which they turned into technicals by arming them with Heavy machine guns, recoilless rifles and AA autocannons. They also captured four Alvis Saladin armoured cars, seven US-made M48A5 main battle tanks (MBTs), AMX-13 light tanks, and forty-three M113 APCs for their own armoured corps.

The PLA's armoured units were further strengthened between 1983 and 1987 with the arrival of some 74 T-55A MBTs, BTR-152V1, BTR-60PB, and BMP-1 APCs and two ZSU-23-4M1 Shilka SPAAGs supplied on loan by the DPFLP, Syria, Libya, and the USSR; a few M3/M9 Zahlam half-tracks were captured from the Lebanese Forces in 1983. For logistical support, the PLA relied on Toyota Land Cruiser (J42) hardtop, Toyota Land Cruiser (J45) hardtop and Nissan Patrol 160-Series (3rd generation) hardtop light pickups, Syrian-supplied Mercedes-Benz Unimog 416 and GAZ-66 light trucks, GMC C4500 medium-duty trucks, Soviet ZIL-131 (6x6) military trucks, Ural-4320 AWD (6x6) general purpose trucks, captured Israeli AIL M325 Command Cars ('Nun-Nun') and US M35A2 2½-ton (6x6) military trucks. A number of Soviet BTS-4 and VT-55KS Armoured Recovery Vehicles (ARV) and MAZ-537G tank transporters were also employed. Volkswagen (Type 2) T3 Transporter vans were used as military ambulances.

=== Artillery ===
The PLA also fielded a powerful artillery corps equipped with obsolete Soviet ZiS-2 57 mm anti-tank guns, M1944 (BS-3) 100 mm anti-tank and field guns, M101A1 105 mm towed field howitzers, Mle 1950 BF-50 155 mm howitzers, Soltam M-71 155 mm 39 caliber towed howitzers, 122 mm howitzer 2A18 (D-30), 130 mm towed field gun M1954 (M-46), Chinese Type 59-1 130mm field guns and M1955 (D-20) 152 mm towed gun-howitzers, whilst the rocket corps fielded truck-mounted BM-11 122 mm and BM-21 Grad 122 mm and towed Chinese Type 63 107 mm MBRLs. A small number of DEFA D921/GT-2 90mm anti-tank guns mounted on M3/M9 Zahlam half-tracks were captured from the Lebanese Forces in 1983-84.

Yugoslav Zastava M55 A2 20 mm, Soviet ZPU (ZPU-1, ZPU-2, ZPU-4) 14.5mm and ZU-23-2 23 mm Anti-aircraft autocannons (mostly mounted on technicals and BTR-152 and M113 APCs), and towed M1939 (61-K) 37 mm and AZP S-60 57 mm anti-aircraft guns were employed in both air defense and direct fire supporting roles. In addition to AA guns and autocannons, the PLA received from Syria a number of man-portable, shoulder-launched Soviet SA-7 Grail surface-to-air (SAM) missiles which were used to bring down two Lebanese Air Force Hawker Hunter fighter jets and one Israeli Air Force (IAF) Kfir fighter-bomber jet during the 1983–84 Mountain War (the pilot was rescued by the Lebanese Army).

=== Sea craft ===
The Combat Swimmer and Maritime Special Operations detachment of the West Beirut-based Jal el Bahr "Commando" Company operated a small number of rubber inflatable dinghies that were used for seaborne infiltration operations.

=== Aircraft ===
In 1988, the PLA gained it's greatest trophy when a Lebanese Air Force pilot, the Druze Lieutenant Majed Karameh, defected from Adma airfield located in the East Beirut canton, and flew his Aérospatiale SA 342K Gazelle attack helicopter to the Druze-controlled Chouf, where it was impounded upon landing and transported by a PLA MAZ-537G tank transporter to the Saïd el-Khateeb Barracks at Hammana in the Baabda District. This particular helicopter appears to have never been used in combat by the PLA (since they had no aviation component, and therefore lacked the technically proficient personnel to help fly and maintain the captured airframe), which ended up being simply placed on storage at Hammana under the custody of the Druze 11th Infantry Brigade for the remainder of the Civil War.

== Uniforms and insignia ==
Usually, PLA militiamen wore in the field a mix of military uniforms, western civilian clothes and traditional Druze garb, though they were known to have worn a variety of battle dress, depending on whom they allied to and what other armed forces were occupying their territory.

=== Fatigue clothing ===
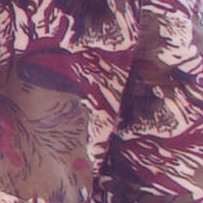
PSP/PLA Pakistani Arid Brushtroke pattern.

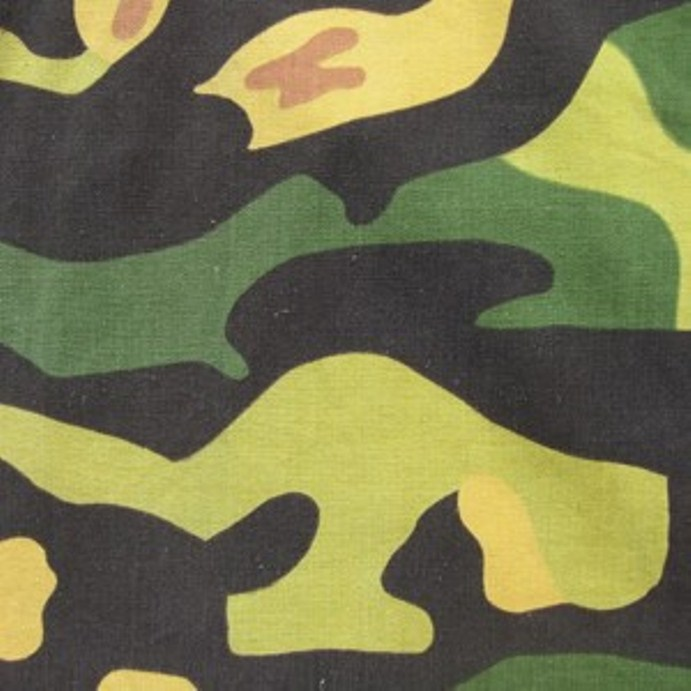
PSP/PLA Czechoslovak Vz 60 "Salamander" (Mlok) pattern.

Besides ex-Lebanese Army olive green fatigues (a special domestic variant of the US Army OG-107 cotton sateen utilities), a light mustard khaki work uniform of Soviet origin made for export was also issued to PLA combat troops, which consisted of a cotton shirt and pants. The shirt featured a six-buttoned front and two unpleated, pointed breast pockets closed by pointed flaps, was provided with shoulder straps and had long sleeves with buttoned cuffs. It was worn with matching trousers, which had two side slashed pockets, two pleated cargo pockets closed by straight, dual-buttoned flaps, and two internal pockets at the back, closed by pointed flaps. Locally produced PLO copies of Iraqi Army olive green and light khaki fatigues, which comprised a shirt with a six-buttoned front, two pleated breast pockets closed by pointed flaps, shoulder straps and long sleeves with buttoned cuffs, plus matching trousers provided with two side slashed pockets and one internal pocket at the back, were widely worn by PLA militiamen. Syrian Army olive green fatigues and captured Israeli olive drab Uniform "B" (Hebrew: Madei Bet) fatigues were used as well.

Camouflage uniforms consisted of Czechoslovak Vz 60 "Salamander" (Mlok) pattern fatigues, Iraqi Highland pattern (a.k.a. "Iraqi Woodland") fatigues, Italian M1929 Telo mimetico fatigues, West German Bundeswehr 1956 Splinter pattern jackets, Syrian or PLO Lizard horizontal and vertical patterns' fatigues, Syrian copies of the Pakistani Arid Brushstroke (nicknamed "Wisp") fatigues, captured U.S. Woodland Battle Dress Uniforms (BDU), and Palestinian Brushstroke fatigues; the latter was a PLO Brushstroke variation incorporating very dark olive and purplish-brown strokes with very long and thin brush trails on a sandy-colored background. The PLA did develop though their own unique camouflage pattern, a hybrid Lizard/Pakistani Arid Brushstroke design, which was locally produced. T-shirts in US Highland pattern were sometimes used.

Syrian-supplied olive green and camouflage US M-1965 field jackets, captured Israeli olive green Dubon Parkas and ex-PLO Iraqi copies of the olive-brown woollen Jordanian Commando Sweater (a.k.a. 'woolly-pully') provided with breast pockets and shoulder straps, were worn in cold weather.

=== Headgear ===
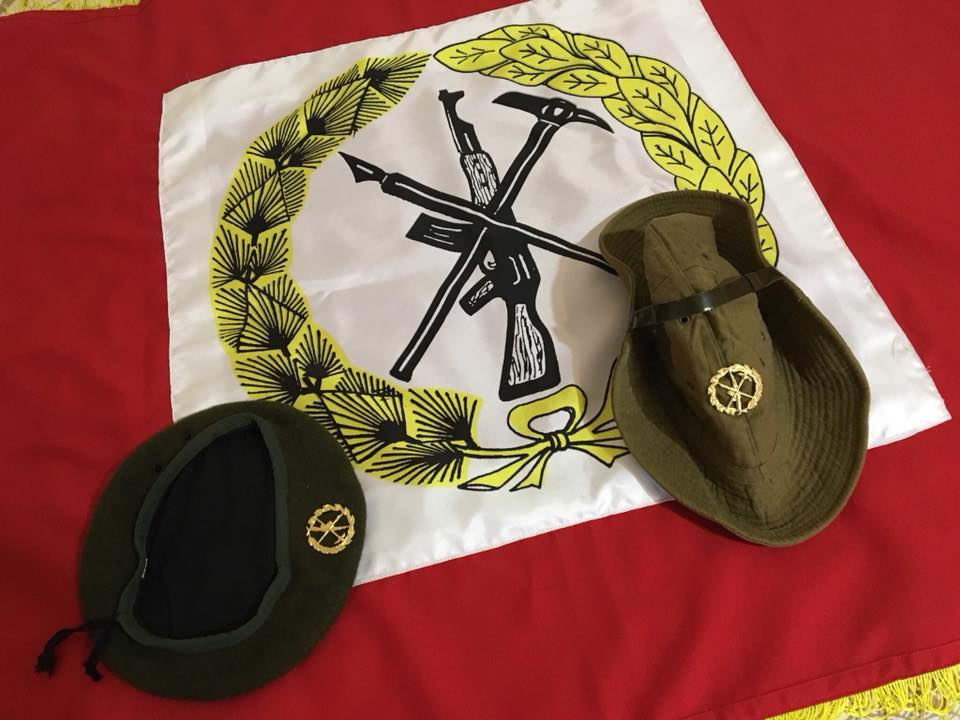
PSP Beret and Soviet-made Afghanistan War Panamanka M-38 Field Hat resting on a PLA flag.

Usual headgear consisted of ex-Lebanese Army Baseball caps (a domestic version of the US Army OG-106 Baseball cap), Czechoslovak field caps in Vz 60 "Salamander" (Mlok) camouflage pattern, PLO patrol caps in lizard camouflage pattern, patrol caps in "Iraqi Woodland" camouflage pattern, and US BDU caps in U.S. Woodland camouflage pattern. Black, midnight blue or olive green berets were worn French-style, pulled to the left, whilst the PLA Security Police Corps were given red berets and "commando" units wore maroon berets, although berets made of Pakistani brushstroke and PLA hybrid lizard/Pakistani brushstroke camouflage cloth were also worn by these special operations' formations. Soviet M-38 Field Hats in mustard khaki cotton (Russian: Panamanka) were worn in the summer, replaced by the traditional Druze tan knitted woollen cap in the winter; Tan-Khaki pile-type caps, fur-lined cloth bomber hats and Ushanka-style shaggy black fur hats were sometimes seen. A black-and-white or red-and-white kaffiyeh was also worn around the neck as a foulard or wrapped around the head to conceal identity.

=== Helmets and body armour ===
In the field, PLA infantrymen could be found wearing a variety of helmet types, consisting of Syrian-supplied East German M-56, Soviet SSh-60 and SSh-68 steel helmets or captured US M-1 and French M1951 NATO (French: Casque Mle 1951 OTAN) steel helmets, and Israeli Orlite OR-201 (Model 76) ballistic helmets. Armoured crews initially received the standard Lebanese Army dark green tanker's compressed fibre-and-leather crash helmet (French copy of the World War II US Army M-1938 Tanker Helmet, nicknamed the "Gruyére"), followed by Soviet TSh-4M black tanker's padded cloth helmets, US fibreglass "bone dome" Combat Vehicle Crewman (CVC) T-56-6 helmets and CVC DH-132 helmets in ballistic Kevlar captured from the Lebanese Army.

In addition to helmets, some PLA militiamen also used captured flak jackets, either the Ballistic Nylon US M-1952/69 "Half-collar" vest and the Israeli-produced Kevlar Rabintex Industries Ltd Type III RAV 200 Protective Vest (Hebrew: "Shapats").

=== Footwear ===
PLA footwear was equally diverse. Black leather combat boots initially came from Lebanese Army stocks, the US Army M-1967 model with DMS "ripple" pattern rubber sole and the French Army "Rangers" BM65 (French: Rangers de l'Armée Française BM65) with double-buckle ankle cuff, or were provided by the PLO and the Syrians, complemented by Israeli black or brown leather paratrooper boots captured from the Lebanese Forces and high-top Pataugas olive canvas-and-rubber patrol boots. Several models of civilian sneakers or "trainers" and "chucks", and rubber gumboots were also used by PLA militiamen.

=== Accoutrements ===
Web gear consisted on the US Army M-1956 load-carrying equipment (LCE) in khaki cotton canvas and the all-purpose lightweight individual carrying equipment (ALICE) in OG Nylon captured from the Lebanese Army, ChiCom Type 56 AK, Type 56 SKS, Type 63 SKS and Type 81 AK chest rigs in khaki or olive green cotton fabric for the AK-47 assault rifle and the SKS semi-automatic rifle, Soviet three-cell and four-cell AK-47 magazine pouches in khaki or OG canvas, East German "raindrop" camouflage four-cell AK-47/AKM magazine pouches, and even IDF olive green Nylon Ephod Combat Vests; several variants of locally made, multi-pocket chest rigs and assault vests in camouflage cloth, khaki and OG canvas or Nylon were also widely used. Anti-tank teams issued with the RPG-7 rocket launcher received the correspondent Soviet rocket bag models in khaki canvas, the Gunner Backpack 6SH12, the Assistant Gunner Backpack and the Munitions Bag 6SH11; Polish and East German versions in rubberized canvas were employed as well. Locally made round brown leather bandoliers and assorted belts, featuring multiple cartridge pockets fastened with small brass pommels meant to carry loose ammunition for quick access, were worn over the shoulder and around the waist by some militiamen issued with bolt-action or semi-automatic rifles.

=== Insignia ===
Apart from sector, corps and unit flags, the PLA apparently never devised a system of rank, branch or unit insignia of their own, although its personnel did wear a variety of field recognition signs. A full-colour cloth embroidered round patch bearing the PSP logo was sometimes worn on the left pocket of fatigue shirts. Berets were worn with the standard PLA cap badge placed above the right eye; issued in gilt metal for all-ranks, it was also found pinned to Soviet field hats, Baseball caps and even combat uniforms. White, red, olive green and black T-shirts stamped with either the PSP logo, the PLA crest, PLA unit and sub-unit insignia or the Party leaders' effigy were commonly worn by Druze fighters.

A red cloth or plastic brassard of roughly triangular shape and attached to a shoulder strap, bearing the stamped full-colour Progressive Socialist Party logo with the initials "PSP" below in white Latin script, flanked by the inscription of the Sector to which the bearer was assigned to and surmounted by another inscription bearing "People's Liberation Army" in white Arabic script, was worn on the upper left arm (the Tanukh Brigade and Security Police Corps were issued their own versions in plastic). A simple red cloth or plastic oval armband bearing only the PSP logo with no lettering was also used. Steel helmets painted in red, marked with white stripes at the sides and the initials "PSP" were issued to Security Police Corps' troopers assigned patrol duties in urban areas.

== In popular culture ==
The Druze PLA has made a few major film appearances, most notably in the 1981 West German anti-war film Circle of Deceit (German title: Die Fälschung), where some of its fighters appear on a night chase scene driving technicals throughout the streets of west Beirut. They are also mentioned in the 1990 American military action film Navy SEALs and in the 2001 American action thriller film Spy Game, appearing on a street fighting scene set during the War of the Camps in Beirut.

PLA troops are also featured on 1980s archived TV news footage in the episode of the 2018 Al Jazeera English War Hotels documentary series dedicated to the Commodore Hotel in west Beirut.

== See also ==
- Al-Mourabitoun
- Amal Movement militia
- Battle of the Hotels
- Holiday Inn Beirut
- Lebanese Arab Army
- Lebanese Civil War
- Lebanese Communist Party
- Lebanese Forces (militia)
- Lebanese National Movement
- Le Commodore Hotel Beirut
- List of extrajudicial killings and political violence in Lebanon
- List of weapons of the Lebanese Civil War
- Mountain War (Lebanon)
- Popular Guard
- Progressive Socialist Party
- St George's Church attack
- Terry Waite
- Vanguard of the Maani Army (Movement of the Druze Jihad)
- War of the Camps
- 2008 conflict in Lebanon
- 4th Infantry Brigade (Lebanon)
- 7th Infantry Brigade (Lebanon)
- 10th Infantry Brigade (Lebanon)
