= Le Commodore Hotel Beirut =

Hotel in Beirut, Lebanon

Le Commodore Hotel Beirut, also known as the Beirut Commodore Hotel, Hotel Commodore, or simply the Commodore is a five-star luxury hotel located on Rue Baalbek in the Hamra district of Beirut in Lebanon.

== History ==
During the Lebanese Civil War, the Commodore became the international news media's hotel of choice, providing a safe haven for many Lebanese and foreign correspondents and diplomats on assignment between 1975 and 1987. When registering at the hotel, guests were greeted with the question "Artillery side or car-bomb side?" Another fixture at the hotel during the war was the resident parrot, Coco, who frequently startled visitors by imitating the sound of incoming shells. The bird disappeared during a round of fighting in 1987 and was believed to have been taken by a gunman who stormed the hotel.

Unlike other foreign journalists, the Robert Fisk, the Middle East correspondent for The Times who set residence at Beirut in 1976, stated that he never stayed in the Commodore, describing it as a seedy hotel with extremely high prices, where he met regularly with colleagues from the Associated Press to have lunch with them at the hotel's restaurant.

In mid-February 1986, a week of fighting between the Druze (PSP) and Amal militias took place. The PSP drove Amal from most of West Beirut, including the Commodore. The hotel was extensively looted for several days. Order was restored on 22 February by the arrival of the Syrian army, which entered West Beirut for the first time since being evacuated in August 1982. After the war, the hotel was demolished (demolition started in February 1987) and built anew. Hussam Boubess was among the investors of the new hotel. It reopened in February 1996 and was affiliated with Concorde Hotels of France.

In January 2026, the hotel ceased operations.

== Famous guests ==
- Terry A. Anderson
- Jonathan Dimbleby
- Thomas Friedman
- John McCarthy (journalist)
- Terry Waite

== Description ==
The hotel consists of a seven-story building with 203 guest rooms and suites, some with private balconies.

== In popular culture ==
The Commodore Hotel is briefly mentioned in a scene of the 2001 action thriller film Spy Game, set during the War of the Camps in Beirut.

== See also ==
- Amal movement militia
- Battle of the Hotels
- Beirut Central District
- Holiday Inn Beirut
- People's Liberation Army (Lebanon)
- Lebanese Civil War
- Lebanon hostage crisis
- War of the Camps

== Bibliography ==
- John Laffin, The War of Desperation: Lebanon 1982-85, Osprey Publishing Ltd, London 1985. ISBN 0 85045 603 7
- Thomas L. Friedman, From Beirut to Jerusalem, Anchor Books, 1990. ISBN 978-0385413725, 0385413726
- Tim Llewellyn, Spirit of the Phoenix: Beirut and the Story of Lebanon, I.B. Tauris, London 2010. ISBN 978-1-84511-735-1 –
- Robert Fisk, Pity the Nation: Lebanon at War, London: Oxford University Press, (3rd ed. 2001). ISBN 0-19-280130-9 –
- Robert Fisk, The Great War for Civilization: The Conquest of the Middle East, Harper Perennial, London 2006. ISBN 978-1-84115-008-6
