= Kfarmatta =

Kfarmatta Kafr Matta
- village
- Location within Lebanon
- Coordinates: 33°43′36″N 35°31′31″E
- Country: Lebanon
- Governorate: Mount Lebanon
- District: Aley

Kfarmatta or Kfar Matta (Arabic: كفرمتى) is a Lebanese village in the Aley District of Mount Lebanon Governorate, Lebanon.

The village is home to four hundred centennial olive trees, covering an area of 1.2 hectares.

== Lebanese civil war ==
The village was the site of one the worst massacres of the Mountain War, a phase of the Lebanese Civil War fought mainly between Druze and Christian militias. The massacre happened on 5 September 1983, when Phalangist militias and the Lebanese Armed Forces captured the village from Druze forces. After the capture happened rumours of a massacre by Phalangist forces began to circulate, and UPI reported that "up to forty" Druze civilians had been killed. Druze forces then massacred Christian civilians in what is expected to be a retaliation action for the massacre, and from 4 to 6 September 1983, Christians were massacred in the Bhamdoun area by the People's Liberation Army aided by Palestinian militants.

After Druze militias recaptured Kfarmatta five months later, they reported that they had found the bodies of some 117 Druze civilians, including women and children, who had been killed by the Christian militias and Lebanese Army. The attackers did not try to bury the bodies so witnesses reported seeing corpses hanging from balconies and lying on the streets. Among the dead was the Druze village sheikh and his family.

Phalangist official Fadi Frem confirmed that the village had been captured, but denied that a massacre had taken place. Commander of the Lebanese Army Ibrahim Tannous ordered an investigation into the massacre. His report concluded that there was no involvement by Lebanese soldiers in the massacre, which Druze witnesses and community leaders rejected as false and a whitewashing of the army.

During the recapture of Kfarmatta, Canadian journalist Clark Todd, the London Bureau chief for the CTV Television Network, was shot near the town by combatants. He was brought inside the village for shelter by his TV crew, but he died from his injuries while the crew went out looking for help.

== Notable residents ==
- Amin Nasser ad-Din (1876–1953), a Lebanese journalist, writer, and linguist.
