= Clark Todd =

Canadian journalist

- Born: October 10, 1944; Saint John, New Brunswick, Canada
- Died: September 5, 1983 (aged 38); Kfar Matta, Lebanon
- Education: University of New Brunswick

Clark Todd (10 October 1944 – 5 September 1983) was the London bureau chief for the CTV Television Network. He was wounded in fighting in the Aley Mountains while covering the civil war in Lebanon in 1983 with a television crew. The crew found shelter for him in the village of Kfar Matta and went for help, but he died from his wounds before they were able to return. Todd, a graduate of University of New Brunswick, covered events in Biafra, Poland, Belfast and many other conflict areas, while also winning international recognition in much broader areas of journalism. He received the Amos Tuck Award for Best Economic Reporting (1978), on the topic of the Fall of the Dollar; the Overseas Press Club of America Award for Best Documentary (1977), on Eurocommunism; the Bagriel Award (1979), for a report on The Pope in Poland; the Peabody Award (1979); and posthumously, the Michener Award to an individual whose efforts exemplify the best in public service journalism (1983).

Todd was the first journalist killed in the Lebanese Civil War.

== Personal life ==
Todd was born in Saint John, New Brunswick, Canada, and raised by his mother in difficult circumstances. He graduated from the Saint John High School, and later graduated from the University of New Brunswick. His broadcasting career included CKGM in Montreal and CJON in St. John's, Newfoundland and Labrador. In 1972, he married a British woman, Anne Carmichael (his second wife), and they settled in Hatfield, Hertfordshire. Prior to his CTV attachment, he worked mostly as a freelance journalist based in London.
