= Doobon coat =

Israeli military winter coat

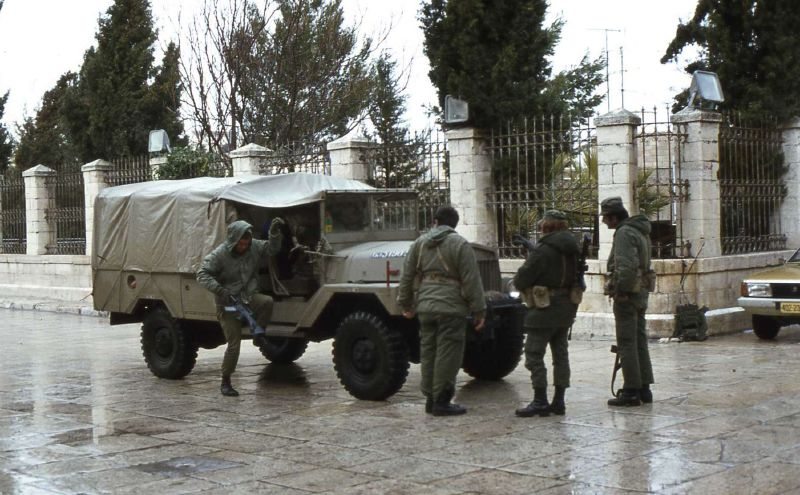
- Israeli soldiers on patrol wearing Doobon coats, Bethlehem, 1978.
- Type: Military cold weather parka
- Place of origin: Israel

Service history
- Used by: See Users
- Wars: 1978 South Lebanon conflict 1982 Lebanon War; Falklands War; Lebanese Civil War; First Intifada; Al-Aqsa Intifada; South Lebanon conflict (1985–2000); 2000–2006 Shebaa Farms conflict 2006 Lebanon War; Battle of Gaza (2007); Gaza War (2008–09); 2014 Israel–Gaza conflict Gaza war

Production history
- Designer: IDF Logistics Corps
- Designed: 1970s
- Manufacturer: IDF Logistics Corps; Hagor Industries Ltd; ISREX Ltd; S.I.S Sal Safety & Uniforms (Lebanon); Columbus LB (Lebanon); Idaho (France); TREESCO (France)
- Produced: 1971–present
- Variants: See Variants

The Doobon coat (Hebrew: מעיל דובון | me'eel Doobon), also called the Dubon military cold weather parka, Dubon winter parka, Dubon parka or IDF winter parka, is an Israeli windproof military winter coat issued to the Israel Defense Forces (IDF) of the State of Israel since the early 1970s. It replaced the British-style heavy woollen Greatcoats and Battledress jackets, and US M-1943 and M-1965 field jackets previously worn by Israeli infantry and elite units during the 1967 Six-Day War, the 1967-1970 War of Attrition, and the 1973 Yom Kippur War. In Hebrew, the name 'Doobon' means 'Little Bear', purportedly because this winter coat makes anyone wearing it look like a teddybear – and by extension because it's as warm as a bear's hug.

== History ==
The Doobon coat was first developed and produced in 1971 by the IDF Logistics Corps for its combat troops, being specially designed to keep Israeli soldiers and laborers warm at any weather while operating outdoors for prolonged periods of time. Its original colors were olive green for the IDF ground forces and Royal blue for the Israeli Air Force (IAF), Israeli Navy and Israeli security forces personnel. These are almost the only colors in which is manufactured to date, although Khagor ("חגור") Ltd. received a concession to use the Doobon brand for coats that are marketed for sale to both IDF soldiers and Israeli civilians.

== Design ==
The Doobon coat is a padded garment of military-grade construction, comprising a waterproof outer layer made of 100% Dacron and an inner layer made of 100% Nylon, with a lining in between filled with hollow synthetic fibers and Acrylon for insulation, designed to retain the wearer's body temperature and shield him from the harsh weather conditions typically found on cold climates. It has one inner pistol pocket placed near the upper left sleeve and two outer built-in slashed side pockets, sleeves reinforced at the elbow by oval-shaped patches, stretchable cuffs, shoulder straps, functional drawstrings at both waist and hood that provide additional warmth and comfort, and a regular insulated hood provided with slots for use with communications gear. The coat has a double front fly closure, comprising a full length metal zipper with a storm flap secured by four metal press studs and weights 1.25 kg.

== Variants ==
=== Israeli variants ===
The IAF blue female parka differs from the male variant in that it has no slots in the hood for headphones, and has outer plastic closures in the front fly.

== Military use ==
=== Israeli service ===
The IDF first got the opportunity to test its new Doobon coat during the 1978 South Lebanon conflict.

=== Middle East ===
During the Lebanese Civil War, the pro-Israeli militias in Lebanon, the Christian Lebanese Forces (LF) and the South Lebanon Army (SLA) also began to receive the Doobon coat in substantial quantities to equip their troops in the late 1970s, with captured examples eventually falling into the hands of militiamen from other Lebanese factions throughout the 1980s and 1990s. Photographic evidence taken at the time shows the Israeli winter parka being used by fighters from the Druze People's Liberation Army (PLA), the Shia Amal Movement and Hezbollah.

=== Latin America ===
The Argentine Army ordered in the early 1980s some 200,000 parkas of a commercially produced version of the Doobon, made under contract in Israel by ISREX Ltd, which were issued to Argentine infantry units during the Falklands War, but later they produced their own version.

== Civilian use ==
=== Israel ===
Outside the military, the Doobon coat is worn mostly by Israeli civilians who have to work in the open for long hours on winter time, and by those who belong to Zionist groups that manifest their opposition towards trendy and fashionable clothing. The Doobon coat is also a symbol of Modern Orthodox Judaism and residents of the Israeli settlements, as well as for socialist Zionists, including Kibbutz members.

The Doobon coat symbolizes being an Israeli in the work of various artists, including those of Yehonatan Geffen. In his Ballad of Druze, he rhymed the words Druze (in Hebrew "Droozy" דרוזי) and Uzi, and phrased "Well, with the Doobon and the Uzi, who can see he is a Druze?"

=== Lebanon ===
The Doobon coat proved so popular amongst Lebanese militiamen and civilians alike during the Civil War years, that by the early 2000s the Lebanese private firm S.I.S Sal Safety & Uniforms began producing an unlicensed local copy, which is commercially marketed as the 'RATRF Field jacket ripstop textile waterproof'. Another Lebanese company, Columbus LB , has developed multiple updated camouflaged variants of the Doobon (including, but not limited to: M81 Woodland, Portuguese/Palestinian vertical lizard and A-TACS AU) and keeps manufacturing the original solid-color versions as well.

== Users ==
- Argentina: used by the Argentine Army.
- Israel: used by the Israel Defense Forces and Israel security forces.
- Turkey: used by the Turkish Land Forces.
- Palestine: used by the Palestinian National Security Forces.
- Hamas (Izz ad-Din al-Qassam Brigades): captured from the IDF and PNSF or acquired as surplus.
- Hezbollah: captured from the South Lebanese Army or locally made copies.
- Lebanon: locally-produced variants used by the Lebanese Armed Forces and Internal Security Forces.

=== Former users ===
- Amal Movement: captured from the Lebanese Forces and the South Lebanon Army (1983–2000).
- Lebanese Forces: provided by Israel (1978–1993).
- People's Liberation Army (Lebanon): captured from the Lebanese Forces (1983–1993).
- South Lebanon Army: provided by Israel (1978–2000).

== See also ==
- Ephod Combat Vest
- Tembel hat
- OR-201
- M-1965 field jacket
