= Hamza akl Hamieh =

Lebanese militant and aircraft hijacker (1954-2018)

Hamza akl Hamieh (1954 – 1 February 2018), known simply as 'Hamza', was a Lebanese militant and aircraft hijacker.

In 1984, Hamza was appointed military commander of the Lebanese Shi'ite political movement Afwaj al Muqawimal al Lubnaniya (Lebanese Resistance Regiments).

== Early life ==
Hamza Akl Hamieh was born in Taraya, Baalbek, Lebanon. In his twenties, he became a follower of the Shi'ite religious leader, Imam Musa al-Sadr.

== Militant career ==
According to Hamza Akl Hamieh, he volunteered at a young age for the Amal Movement, which he said helped shape the mindset that later led him to join Hezbollah. At around the age of twenty, he joined the leftist Muslim factions during the Lebanese Civil War in Beirut, and later fought against the Israeli invasion of Lebanon (1978).

He carried out at least six aircraft hijackings between 1979 and 1982, reportedly in response to the disappearance of Musa al-Sadr. Beginning in 1979 with his "Sons of Musa al-Sadr brigade", he became known among young Shi'ites, and his activities culminated in the hijacking of Kuwait Airways Flight 561 in Beirut on 24 February 1982.

Just 79 days earlier, he had completed the second longest hijacking in history, after commandeering Libyan Arab Airlines 727 in midair between Zurich and Tripoli, flying 6,000 miles with multiple stops throughout Europe and the Middle East before landing in Lebanon three days later.

As an Amal commander in the early 1980s Hamieh led many operations against the Multinational Force in Lebanon. Including the 1983 barracks bombings that killed 241 US military personnel and an attack in January 1984 on airport positions.

The US intelligence mentions Hamza as a possible organizer of the TWA flight hijacking

Hamza Akl Hamieh served as military commander of Amal from 1984 to 1987, and left the movement in 1992.

Having ties with Hezbollah, he formed the Castle Brigade to enable Sunnis in Baalbek to fight in the Syrian Civil War.

=== Internationally ===
He fought in 1979 in Afghanistan against the Soviets and in the Iran–Iraq War on the Iranian side. In the 2010s he was advising the Kurds how to fight ISIS

== Personal life ==
He lived in Lebanon until his death and was interviewed in Beirut in November 2014.
