= Anwar al-Fatayri =

Anwar Al Fatayri
- أنور الفطايري
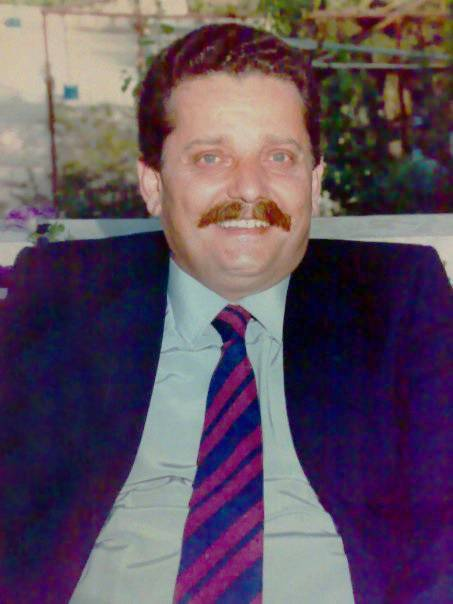
- Born: February 1946
- Died: 9 February 1989 (aged 42–43); Chouf district, Lebanon
- Education: Beirut Arab University; Lebanese University
- Occupation: Politician

Anwar Habib al-Fatayri (Arabic: أنور حبيب الفطايري; February 1946 – 9 February 1989) was a Lebanese Druze politician and junior commander of the People's Liberation Army who was assassinated on 9 February 1989.

== Biography ==
=== Early life and education ===
Anwar bin Hassib Al-Fatayri was born in Jdeideh of the Chouf district in Lebanon in 1946. He received his primary education at Al-Mukhtara School and secondary education at the School of the Missionary Fathers in Jounieh. He then joined the Faculty of Education at the Lebanese University and obtained a BA in Mathematics and then at the Arab University, where he obtained a BA in History.

=== Career ===
In the Progressive Socialist Party, he assumed several offices. He was the secretary of its youth wing and the Mobilization Commissioner in 1976, the secretary of the Publicity and Publication Commission in 1978, a member of the Leadership Council and received the General Secretariat in 1984. In 1985, he was a member of the Political Bureau and a member of the Committee Central until the date of his assassination.

== Assassination ==
On 9 February 1989, Fatayri was in Wadi Benhaliah, the Chouf region, preparing for a military implementation by Walid Jumblatt. A general that was alongside Fatayri shot him for reasons that are still unknown. A full national funeral was held for him in Dar Al-Mukhtara, in which a number of dignitaries and national leaders spoke, including Walid Jumblatt.

On 14 April 2018, Taymur Jumblatt, son of Walid, unveiled the statue of Anwar al-Fatayri, in a celebration that was held in the town of Jdeideh in the Chouf district, in the presence of Progressive Socialist Party leaders, municipal governors and civil and Druze sheikhs.

== See also ==
- Lebanese Civil War
- Mountain War (Lebanon)
- People's Liberation Army (Lebanon)

== Bibliography ==
- Makram Rabah, Conflict on Mount Lebanon: The Druze, the Maronites and Collective Memory, Alternative Histories, Edinburgh University Press, 2020 (1st edition). ISBN 978-1474474177
