= Cordura =

Brand of high-performance fabrics developed by DuPont and now owned by Invista

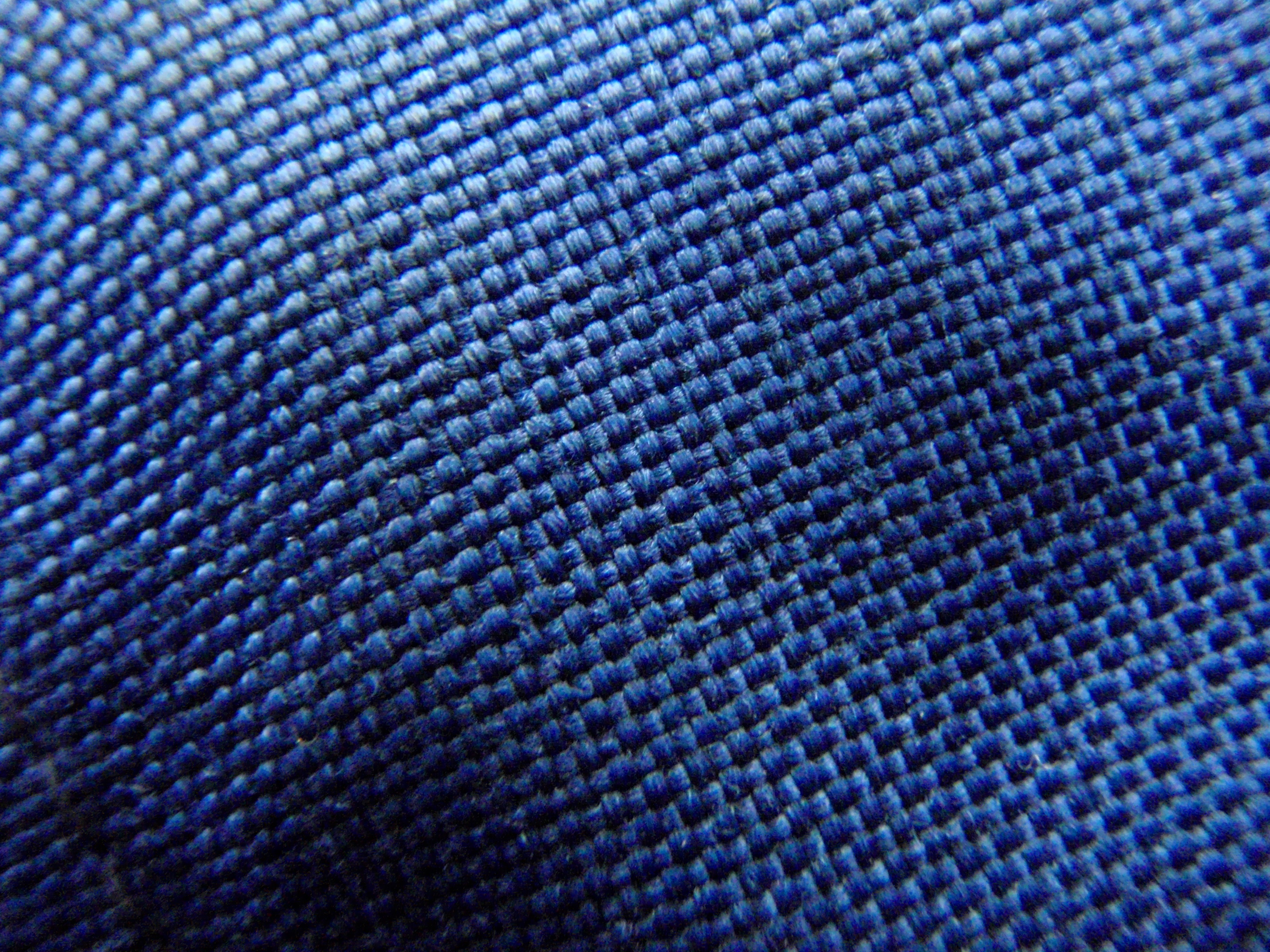
Blue Cordura fabric

Product hangtag

Cordura is a brand of synthetic fiber-based fabrics used in products such as luggage, backpacks, trousers, military wear, and performance apparel.

Cordura was developed and trademarked by DuPont in 1929; it is currently owned by Invista, a subsidiary of Koch Industries.

== Overview ==
DuPont introduced Cordura as a type of rayon, a semi-synthetic fiber made from natural sources of regenerated cellulose.

=== Development ===
In 1948 DuPont claimed its Cordura high-tenacity rayon was "as strong as mild steel yet able to stand up under repeated flexing":

DuPont scientists were working to improve on the properties of rayon…when, in 1928, a rubber company asked for a rayon yarn that would be stronger than cotton for tire cords. The problem was given to a team of organic, physical, and analytical chemists, chemical and mechanical engineers and physicists. In developing the new improved rayon, a number of theoretical studies were carried out: for example, (1) rates of diffusion of the coagulating bath into the viscose filaments, (2) the mechanism of coagulation of viscose, (3) the relationship between fiber structure and properties by X-rays, and (4) a phase study of spinning baths. Concurrently, applied research was necessary. This proceeded along many lines, but the main problem was the spinning technique. It was known that a short delay in the bath between the spinneret and the stretching operation allowed greater tension on the filaments. DuPont engineers, therefore, designed a series of rollers, each revolving faster than the previous one, to increase the tension gradually. In addition, a textile finish was developed that combined just the right amount of plasticizing action and lubricating power, allowing the filaments to twist evenly in forming the cord. A new adhesive was prepared to join the yarn with rubber. New twisting techniques for cord manufacture were found, since the usual methods caused loss in rayon strength. Chemical and mechanical engineers were faced with the design and operation of equipment for more than 15 different types of unit operations. Equipment had to operate every minute of the day, yet turn out perfectly uniform yarn. It was necessary to filter the viscose so carefully that it would pass through spinning jet holes less than 4/1000 of an inch without plugging. Some of the most exacting temperature and humidity control applications in the chemical industry were required. Out of the cooperation among scientists—ranging from studies of cellulose as a high polymer to design of enormous plants—came a new product, "Cordura" high-tenacity rayon, as strong as mild steel yet able to stand up under repeated flexing. Tires made with it are less bulky and cooler running, yet give greater mileage under adverse operating conditions. [1948 DuPont advertisement]

=== Expansion ===
Cordura was further developed during World War II and used in tires for military vehicles.

By 1966, three decades after the arrival of nylon formulations, the Cordura brand name was transferred to nylon products. Eastpak was the first brand to use Cordura fabric in their luggage. By 1979, "soft-sided" Cordura luggage made up about 40 percent of the luggage market.

JanSport used the canvas-like nylon in their original daypacks in the 1970s, and now exclusively uses polyester Cordura. In the 1980s, 1000 denier (D) Cordura nylon was adopted for duffle bags. During the 1990s, European workwear clothing brands adopted the 1000D and 500D fabric for reinforcements. Today, Cordura is used in textile motorcycle jackets and pants for abrasion resistance.

Variants of Cordura fabrics vary in weight, appearance, tear resistance, and color retention. There are also base layer, denim, and canvas fabrics that blend Invista 420 D nylon 6, 6 fiber, and cotton, known as "Cordura Baselayer," "Cordura Denim," and "Cordura Duck," respectively.

Some Cordura fabrics have been specifically designed for military applications and extended outdoor use.
