= Mustard (color) =

Color

Color coordinates
- Hex triplet: #FFDB58
- sRGB^{B} (r, g, b): (255, 219, 88)
- HSV (h, s, v): (47°, 65%, 100%)
- CIELCh_{uv} (L, C, h): (88, 85, 69°)
- Source: Maerz and Paul
- ISCC–NBS descriptor: Brilliant yellow
- B: Normalized to [0–255] (byte)

Mustard is a dull/dark yellow color that resembles culinary mustard. It is similar to the color Flax.

The first recorded use of mustard as a color name in English was in 1886.

== In culture ==
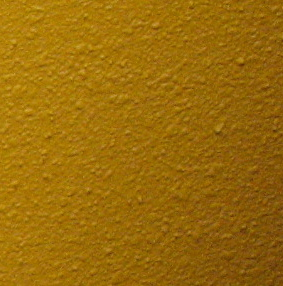
A plaster wall painted a dark shade of mustard called "baby mustard"

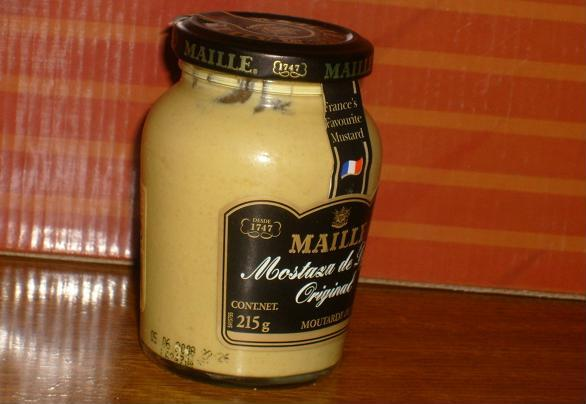
A jar of mustard

- The board game Cluedo has a mustard-colored pawn representing the character Colonel Mustard.
- A mustard-colored belt is awarded to the winner of the Nathan's Hot Dog Eating Contest at Nathan's Famous in Coney Island, New York.
- In the bandana code of the gay leather subculture, wearing a mustard-colored bandana means that one is a size queen. However, the color called "mustard" in the bandana code is lighter than the mustard color shown above.

== See also ==
- List of colors
