= Foulard =

Lightweight twill fabric

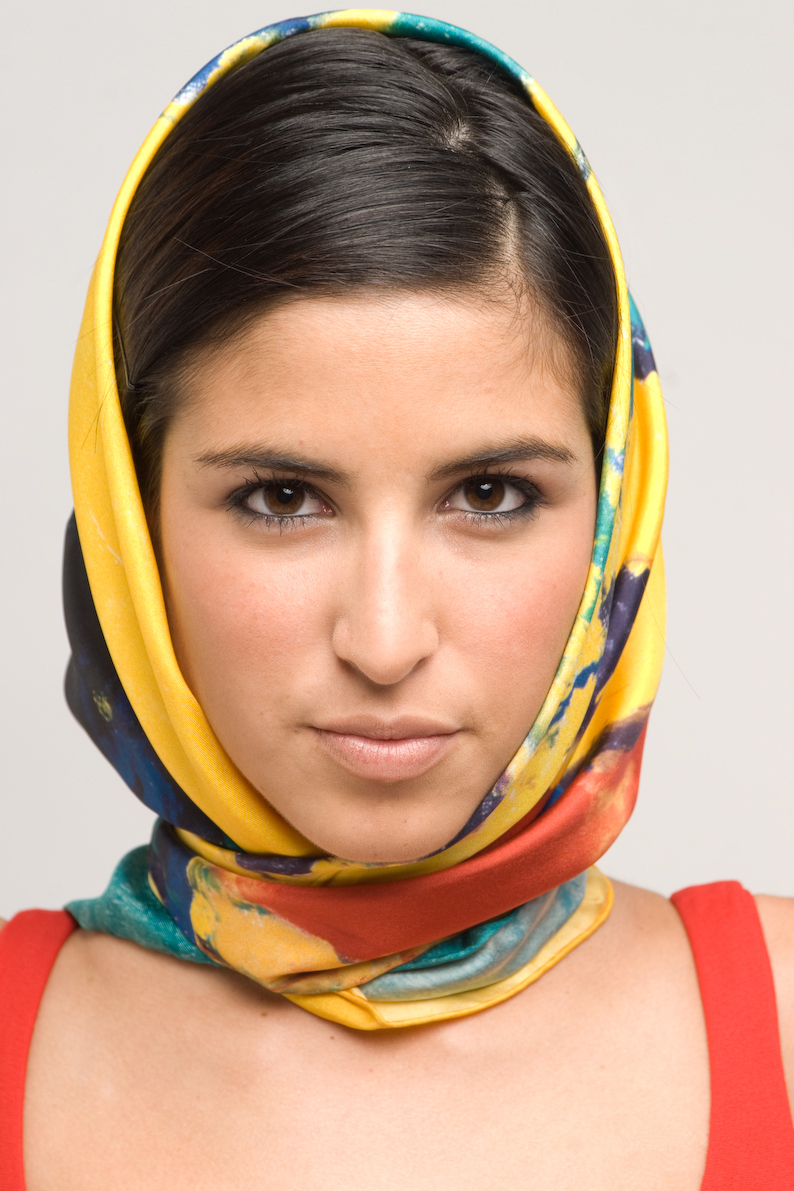
Silk foulard

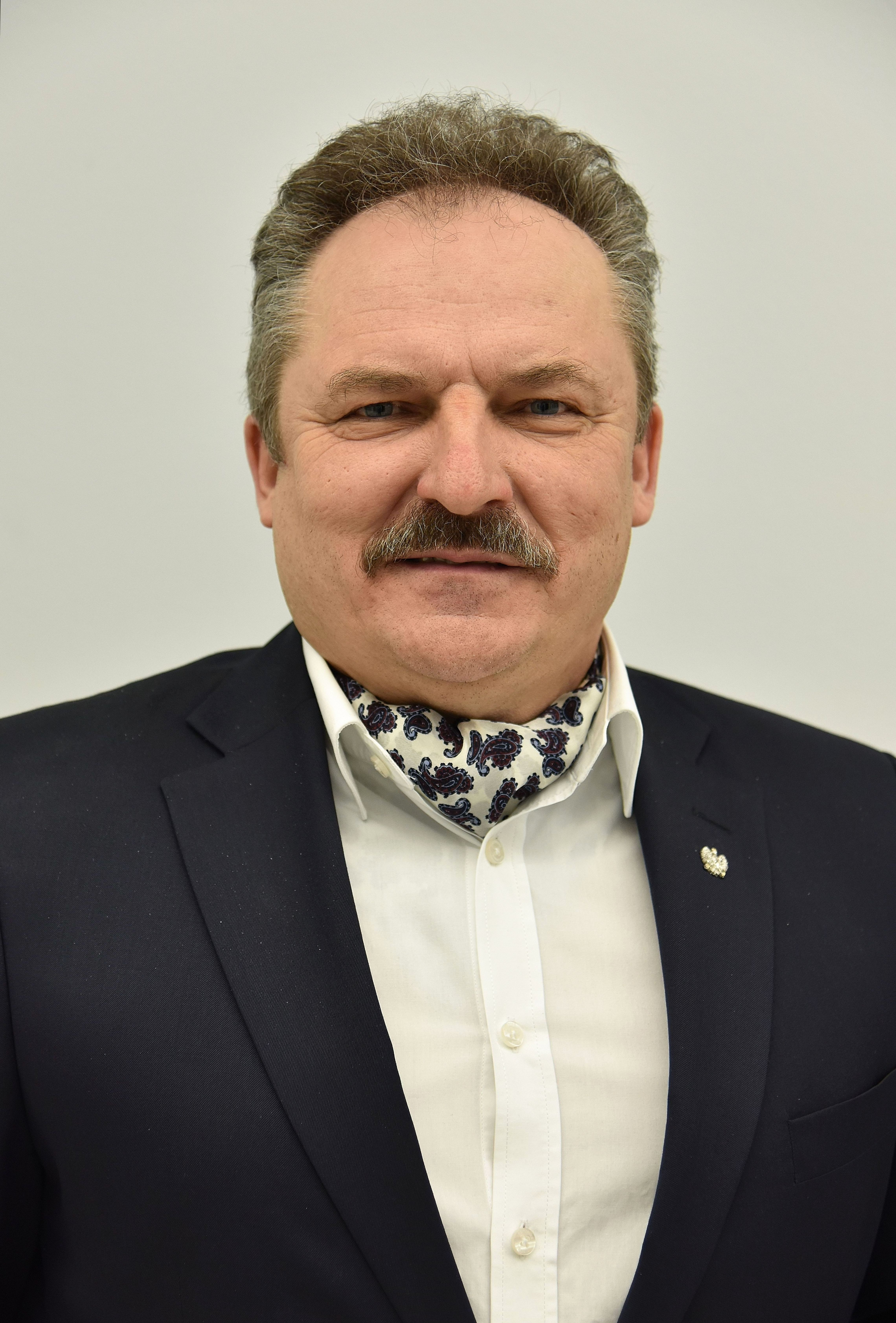
Marek Jakubiak with foulard

A foulard is a lightweight fabric, either twill or plain-woven, made of silk or a mix of silk and cotton. Foulards usually have a small printed design of various colors. By metonymy, it can also be an article of clothing, such as scarves and neckties, made from this fabric. In men's neckties, foulard is a pattern rather than a material; it is a small-scale pattern with a basic block repeat, also called a set pattern or a tailored pattern.

== History ==
Foulard is believed to have originated in East Asia. The word comes from the French word foulard, with the same proper and metonymic meanings. In modern French, foulard is the usual word for a neckerchief. In Quebec foulard is also used for scarf (écharpe in France).

== Modern era ==
Ralph Lauren's fashion industry success began with his importation of foulards from London to the United States.

In 1989, a public debate over headscarves erupted in France when three Muslim girls in a state secondary school refused to remove their headscarves to comply with the school administration's concept of secularism. It became known as the "affaires de foulard."

Foulard fabric is also used in home décor wall coverings.
