= High-top =

Type of shoe

Fila Foggia Hi LTD 03

The high-top is a shoe that extends slightly over the wearer's ankle. It is commonly used for sports, particularly basketball. It is sometimes confused with the slightly shorter mid-top, which typically extends no higher than the wearer's ankle. High-tops also should not be confused with shorter-length boots such as ankle boots, since high-tops usually refer to athletic shoes, although can also refer to other above-ankle shoes such as some hiking boots. Some dress and casual shoes may also be high-tops.

Converse All-Stars, Air Jordans, Nike Air Forces 1, 2, and 3, Reebok Freestyle, Reebok BB4600, Nike Air Yeezy and Fila Foggia Hi LTD are examples of high top sneakers. Others include skateboarding sneakers, such as the Vans Vault Hi Fi LX. High-tops are supportive to the wearer's ankles and are useful to those with hypermobility and fallen arches.

== Gallery ==
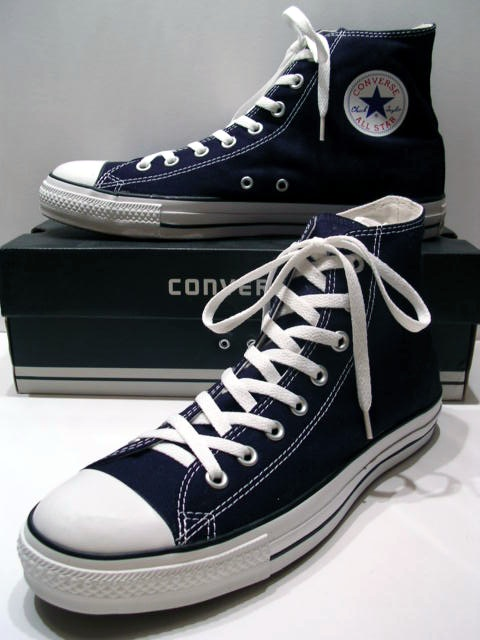
A pair of Converse All-Star high tops

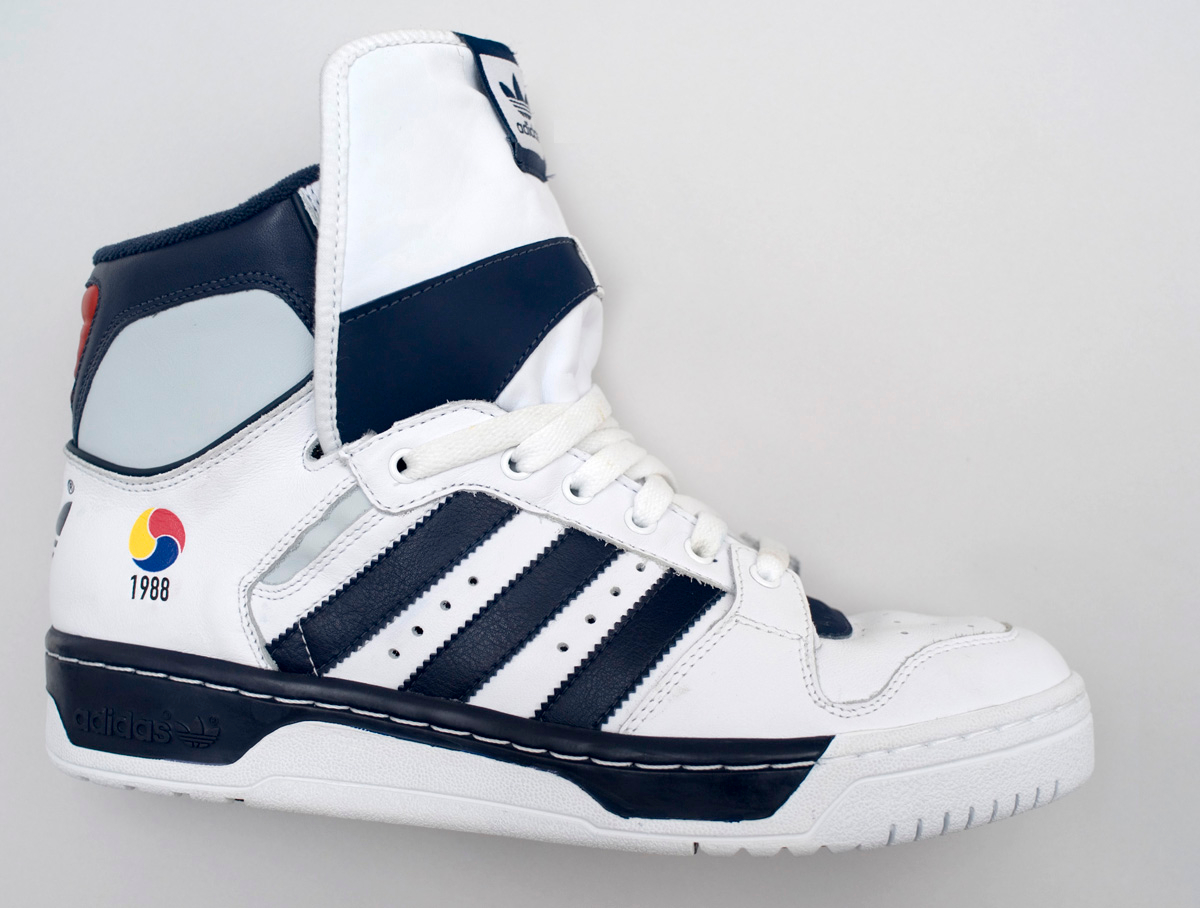
Adidas Conductor High Tops

== See also ==
- List of shoe styles
