= Hamra, Beirut =

Neighborhood in Beirut

Hamra الحمراء
- Neighborhood
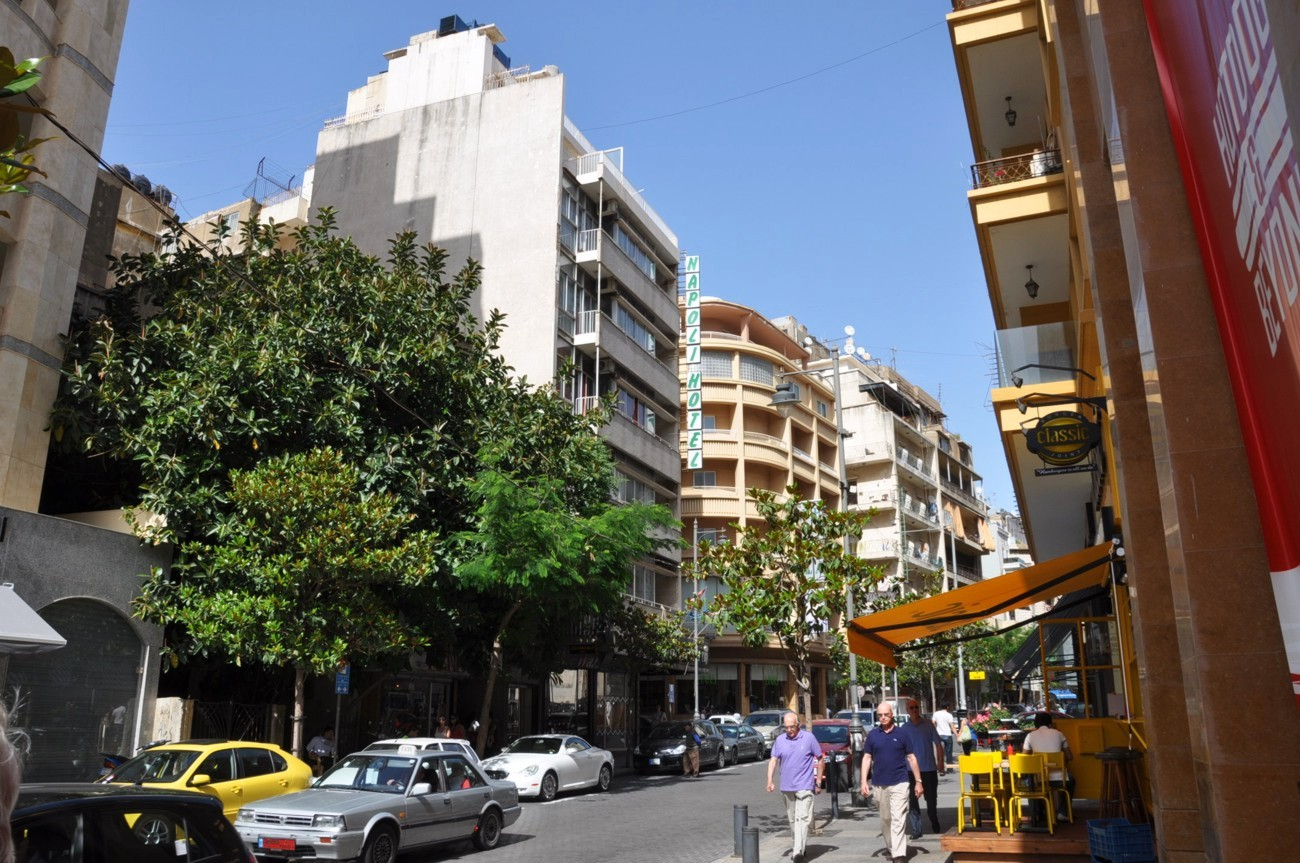

- Location in Lebanon
- Country: Lebanon
- Governorate: Beirut Governorate
- District: Beirut District

Government
  - Municipality: Beirut Municipality

Area
  - Total: 0.52 km^{2} (0.20 sq mi)
- Highest elevation: 50 m (160 ft)
- Lowest elevation: 25 m (82 ft)

Population
  - Total: 8,740
  - Density: 17,000/km^{2} (44,000/sq mi)
- Time zone: UTC+2 (EET)
  - Summer (DST): UTC+3 (EEST)
- Dialing code: +961
- Website: beirut.gov.lb

Hamra (Arabic: الحمراء al-Ḥamrāʾ) is a neighborhood (sector 34) in Beirut, Lebanon (quarter Ras Beirut). The heart of the neighborhood, Hamra Street, is a major commercial district, and is known for its fashion stores, restaurants, cafes, bars and hotels, and a lively nightlife.

The American University of Beirut, Lebanese American University, and Haigazian University are in the neighborhood.

Hamra Street used to be one of the main places where Arab poets, writers, thinkers, and philosophers met and collaborated, making it an important cultural hub. Many impacts of the Lebanese Civil War remain on the walls, but it has also seen development. Although it may not be as culturally and artistically vibrant as before, it remains rich with life and art. Graffiti has become a form of artistic expression along the central boulevard; an example is a mural of the popular singer and icon Sabah towards the beginning of the street.
