= History of the Chouf region =

History of area within Lebanon

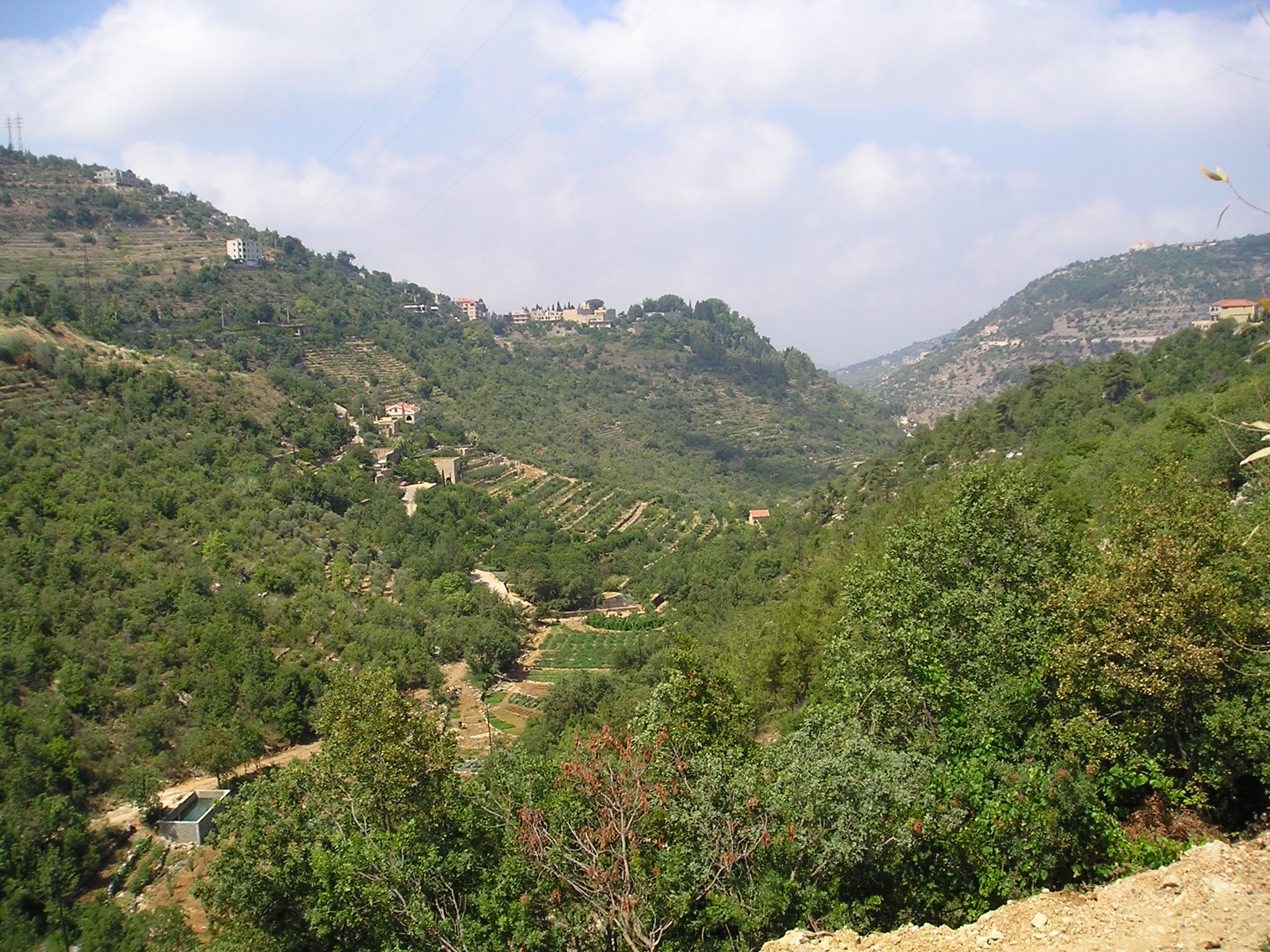
The mountains of the Chouf

The Chouf region, also spelled Shouf, is a historical and geographical area located in the central part of Lebanon. Like much of Lebanon, the Chouf was inhabited by the Phoenicians, an ancient Semitic civilization known for their seafaring skills and trade. However, Evidence of inhabitance in the mountains dates back to the 5th century B.C.E. and archaeological evidence, consisting of Roman burial sites and pottery has proved a continuous inhabitation since 450 B.C.E.

== Early history ==
The Lordship of the Schuf was created out of the Lordship of Sidon as a sub-vassal around 1170. It was centred on the Cave of Tyron. Julian of Sidon sold it to the Teutonic Knights in 1256. Carved into the rock of a cliff overlooking the Bisri and 'Aray valley, the Fortress of Niha overlooks the road between Sidon and the Beqaa Valley. It was first mentioned in 975 AD and then again in 1133. Control over the fortress alternated between the Crusaders and local Muslims until its destruction in 1261. In 1270, the Mamluk leader Baibars ordered it rebuilt.

Archaeological sites lies on a slope of a hill on the outskirts of Shheem in the Chouf Mountains. It is a Roman-Byzantine village with a Roman temple towering above the rest of the ancient architecture. The temple faces east and has a small porch. There is a carving of the sun god Helios on one of the doorframes. Another carving portrays the image of a priest with outstretched arms.

== Ottomans ==
The Ottoman Empire conquered the Levant from the Mamluks following the Battle of Marj Dabiq near Aleppo in 1516. The Ottoman sultan Selim I largely preserved the Mamluk governing structures and officials of the region. His beylerbey (provincial governor) over Damascus, Janbirdi al-Ghazali, had served the same role under the Mamluks. After Janbirdi declared himself sultan following Selim's death in 1520, the Ottomans stamped out his revolt and began to incorporate the Levant more firmly into the empire's structures. The most significant challenge for the Sublime Porte (imperial Ottoman government in Constantinople) in the Levant had been the subjugation of its eastern desert and western mountainous peripheries. Selim had entrusted the pacification of Bedouin tribes and the security of the Hajj pilgrimage route between Damascus and Mecca to the powerful Sunni Muslim Bedouin dynasties of the Beqaa Valley and Jabal Nablus, the Hanash and Tarabay, respectively.

=== Emirate of Mount Lebanon ===
==== Ma'n dynasty ====
The first known government action against the Druze occurred in 1518 during the rebellion of Nasir al-Din, the Hanash chieftain and the sanjak-bey of Sidon-Beirut, against Selim. The rebellion was suppressed by Janbirdi, who arrested and executed Nasir al-Din and captured the latter's Druze allies, the chiefs Qurqumaz, Zayn al-Din and Alam al-Din Sulayman from the Chouf-based Ma'n family and Sharaf al-Din Yahya of the Gharb-based Tanukh-Buhtur family. The four Druze chiefs were released after paying a heavy fine.

The beylerbey of Damascus, Khurram Pasha, launched a punitive expedition against the Chouf Druze led by the Ma'nid chiefs in 1523. Forty-three Druze villages, including Barouk, the headquarters of Qurqumaz, were burned and Ibn Tulun reported that Khurram Pasha returned to Damascus with four camel loads of Druze heads and Druze religious literature proving the religion's hostility to Sunni Islam. The expedition represented the first attempt to impose direct government authority in the Chouf. Khurram Pasha followed up by appointing subashis (police superintendents) to enforce law and order in the area, but they were killed by the Druze. Khurram Pasha responded by launching a second punitive expedition against the Chouf on 18 June 1524, during which thirty villages were burned and the beylerbey returned the next day with three camel loads of Druze heads and 300 Druze women and children captives. The campaigns were lauded by the contemporary ulema and poets of Damascus. There are no further mentions of Druze rebellions or government expeditions in the sources until the late 16th century.

Tensions between the Druze and the Porte rose considerably as the Druze, along with other tribal and sectarian groups in Syria, acquired firearms which were at times superior to the firearms used by the Ottoman armies. The possession of firearms by non-military subjects was forbidden, though the authorities faced difficulties enforcing the ban in Syria. The Syrians obtained at least part of their arsenals from European powers intent on destabilising Ottoman rule in Syria. The arsenals were provided using mercantile ships which docked in the Syrian ports. Other sources included the Janissaries of Damascus, the timar (fief)-holders in Syria and Ottoman ships from Constantinople which came to transport grain from Syria to the imperial capital. Druze armed with long muskets attacked officials sent to collect the taxes from their sub-districts and repulsed the subsequent Ottoman raid against them at Ain Dara in 1565.

In an order by the Porte to the beylerbey of Damascus in August 1574, it is mentioned that the villagers of the Gharb, Jurd, Chouf and Matn owed tax arrears dating over twenty years and that the muqaddams (chieftains) of the Druze possessed large quantities of muskets; the muqaddams named in the order were the Ma'nid Qurqumaz, possibly the grandson of the above-mentioned Qurqumaz, the Tanukhid Sharaf al-Din and the non-Druze chieftains Mansur ibn Hasan of the Keserwan-based Assaf family and Qasim of the Wadi al-Taym-based Shihab family. The beylerbey was ordered to collect at least 6,000 muskets from the named chieftains and more from each household of the named subdistricts. The combined forces of the beylerbey of Damascus, the imperial Damascene Janissaries, the sanjak-bey of Tripoli, and an Ottoman fleet launched an expedition against the Druze that year, but they were unable to subdue and disarm them.

The imperial order from 1574 was renewed in February 1576, but the beylerbey of Damascus was again unable to execute the order rather complaining that the inhabitants of the Gharb, Jurd, Chouf and Matn remained in a state of rebellion, that no multazim was willing to accept the tax farm for the subdistricts and appointed emins (tax collectors) were disrespected by the populace. The Porte consequently ordered that the beylerbey destroy an unspecified number of Druze villages, arrest and punish their muqaddams and collect the tax arrears. No military action was taken and the Druze continued to defy the authorities and were reported by the government to have acquired further muskets in 1582. In that year they were accused of collaborating with the Druze and Shia Muslims of the Safad Sanjak, south of Sidon-Beirut, and the Porte's order called for "get[ting] rid of [Qurqumaz] ibn Ma'n, whose trouble and evil deeds exceed all others".

===== Ottoman invasion of the Chouf =====
The 1585 Ottoman expedition against the Druze, also known as the 1585 Ottoman invasion of the Shuf, was an Ottoman military campaign led by Ibrahim Pasha against the Druze and other chieftains of Mount Lebanon and its environs, then a part of the Sidon-Beirut Sanjak of the province of Damascus Eyalet. It had been traditionally considered the direct consequence of a raid by bandits in Akkar against the tribute caravan of Ibrahim Pasha, then Egypt's outgoing governor, who was on his way to Constantinople. Modern research indicates that the tribute caravan arrived intact and that the expedition was instead the culmination of Ottoman attempts to subjugate the Druze and other tribal groups in Mount Lebanon dating from 1518.

In 1523–1524 dozens of Druze villages were burned in the Chouf area and hundreds of Druze were killed or captured by the governor Khurram Pasha, after which a period of peace ensued. Tensions resumed in the 1560s as Druze and non-Druze local dynasties, particularly the Ma'ns, Assafs and Shihabs, acquired large quantities of prohibited firearms, which were often superior to those possessed by government troops. Military action by the Ottoman governors of Damascus in the 1570s failed to disarm the chiefs and the general population or collect tax arrears, which had been building up from the 1560s.

Ibrahim Pasha was appointed to "rectify the situation" in the Levant in 1583 and launched the expedition against the Druze of Mount Lebanon in the summer of 1585 as a Porte-ordered diversion for his Constantinople-bound caravan. He mobilised about 20,000 soldiers, including the Janissaries of Egypt and Damascus, as well as local chieftains, namely the Bedouin Mansur ibn Furaykh and Druze rivals of the Ma'ns. Hundreds of Druze rebels were slain, thousands of muskets were confiscated and large sums of money were collected as tax arrears by Ibrahim Pasha. The Ma'nid chief Qurqumaz, one of the principal targets of the expedition, died in hiding after refusing to surrender.

The following year the governor of Damascus, Ali Pasha, captured the chieftains of the local Assaf, Harfush, Tanukh and Furaykh dynasties and sent them to Constantinople. They were afterward returned to their home regions and confirmed in their tax farms. The expedition and its aftermath marked a turning point in Ottoman governance of the Levant as local chieftains were thenceforth frequently appointed as sanjak-beys (district governors). One such governor was a son of Qurqumaz, Fakhr al-Din II, who became the most powerful local force in the Levant from the time of his appointments to the sanjaks of Sidon-Beirut and Safad in the 1590s and 1602, respectively, until his downfall in 1633.

The source used for the 1585 expedition by 19th-century chroniclers from Mount Lebanon and modern historians was the account of the Maronite patriarch and historian Istifan al-Duwayhi, which dates to c. 1668. Duwayhi's version attributes the cause of the campaign to a raid of the Constantinople-bound tribute caravan of Egypt's governor Ibrahim Pasha by bandits in Jun Akkar, a coastal area north of Tripoli. Duwayhi's account was reproduced almost identically by the 19th-century, Lebanon-based chroniclers Haydar al-Shihabi (d. 1835) and Tannus al-Shidyaq (d. 1859). Their accounts were the principal source used for the event by the modern historians Peter Malcolm Holt, Abdul Karim Rafeq, Kamal Salibi and Muhammad Adnan Bakhit. The year of the caravan raid was cited as 1584 by Duwayhi, and then by Rafeq, Salibi and Bakhit, while Shihabi, and in turn Holt, placed the raid in 1585.

==== Era of Fakhr al-Din II ====
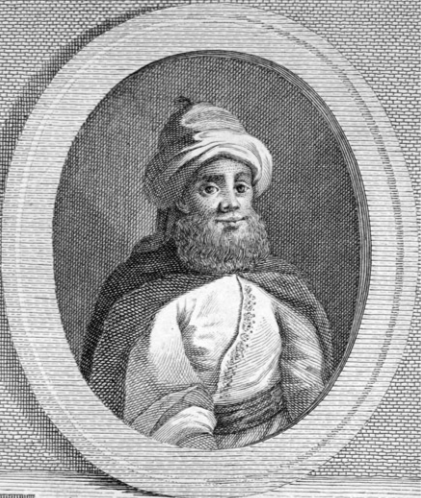
Engraving of a portrait of Fakhr al-Din II.

Around 1590 Qurqumaz was succeeded by his eldest son Fakhr al-Din II as the muqaddam of all or part of the Chouf. Unlike his Ma'nid predecessors, Fakhr al-Din cooperated with the Ottomans, who, though able to suppress Mount Lebanon's local chiefs with massive force, were unable to pacify the region in the long term without local support. When the veteran general Murad Pasha was appointed beylerbey of Damascus, Fakhr al-Din hosted and gave him expensive gifts upon his arrival to Sidon in September 1593. Murad Pasha reciprocated by appointing him the sanjak-bey (district governor, called amir liwa in Arabic sources) of Sidon-Beirut in December. The Ottomans' preoccupation with the wars against Safavid Iran (1578–1590; 1603–1618) and the war with Hapsburg Austria afforded Fakhr al-Din the space to consolidate and expand his semi-autonomous power.

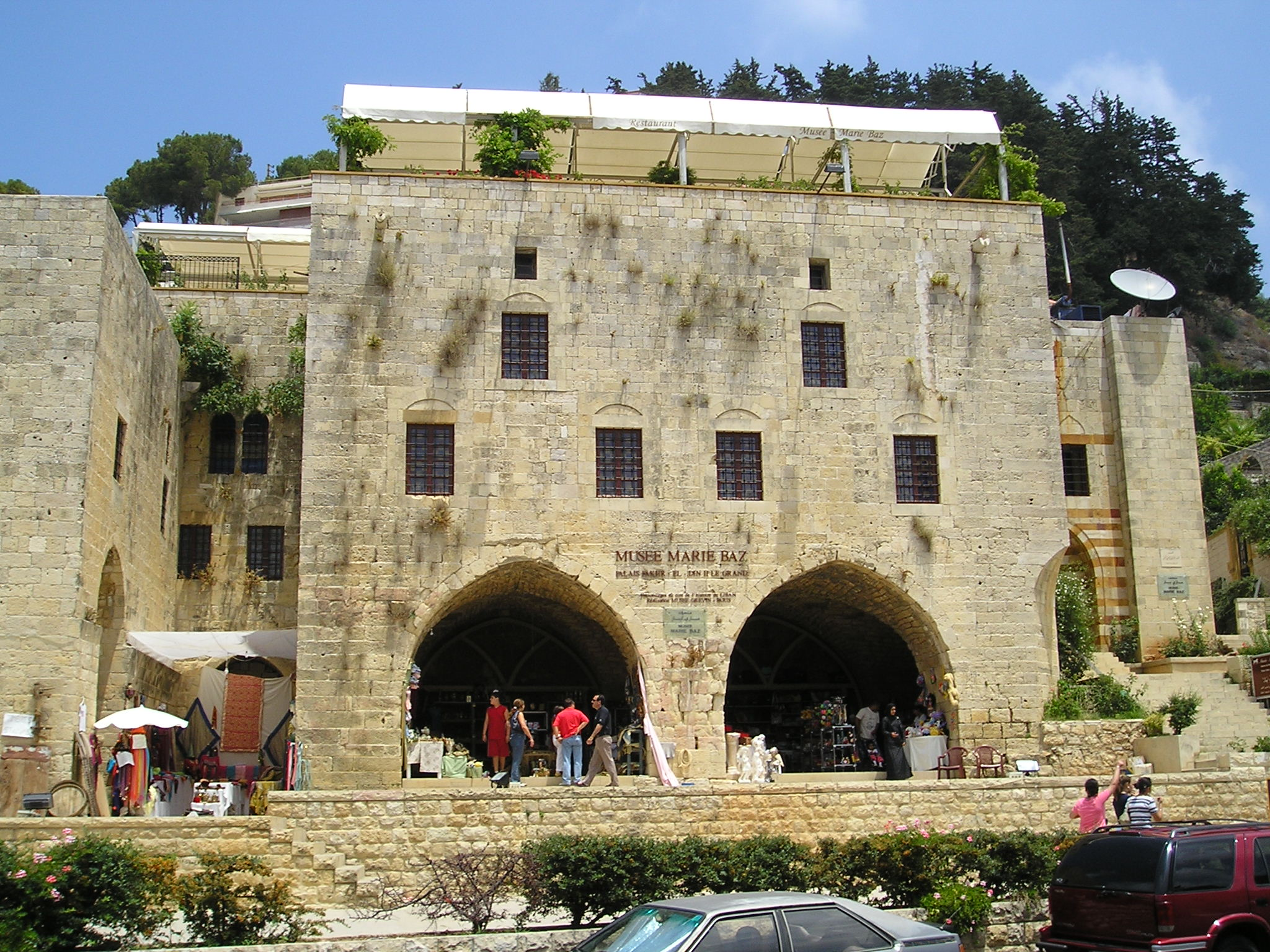
The Palace of Fakjreddine in Deir al-Qamar, seat of the Ma'ns

In July 1602, after his political patron Murad Pasha became a vizier in Constantinople, Fakhr al-Din was appointed the sanjak-bey of Safed. With the Druze of Sidon-Beirut and Safed under his authority, he effectively became their paramount chief. Fakhr al-Din may have been appointed to the post to leverage his Druze power base against the Shia.

In 1606 Fakhr al-Din made common cause with the Kurdish rebel Ali Janbulad of Aleppo against his local rival Yusuf Sayfa of Tripoli; the latter had been invested as commander-in-chief of the Ottoman armies in the Levant to suppress Janbulad. Fakhr al-Din may have been motivated by his ambitions of regional autonomy, defense of his territory from Sayfa, or expanding his control to Beirut and Keserwan, both held by Sayfa. The rebel allies besieged Sayfa in Damascus, eventually forcing his flight. In the course of the fighting, Fakhr al-Din took over the Keserwan. When Janbulad was defeated by the Ottomans, Fakhr al-Din appeased Murad Pasha, who had since become grand vizier, with substantial sums of cash and goods. The high amount is an indicator of the Ma'ns' wealth. Fakhr al-Din was kept as sanjak-bey of Safed, his son Ali was appointed as sanjak-bey of Sidon-Beirut and the Ma'ns' control of Keserwan was recognized by the Porte.

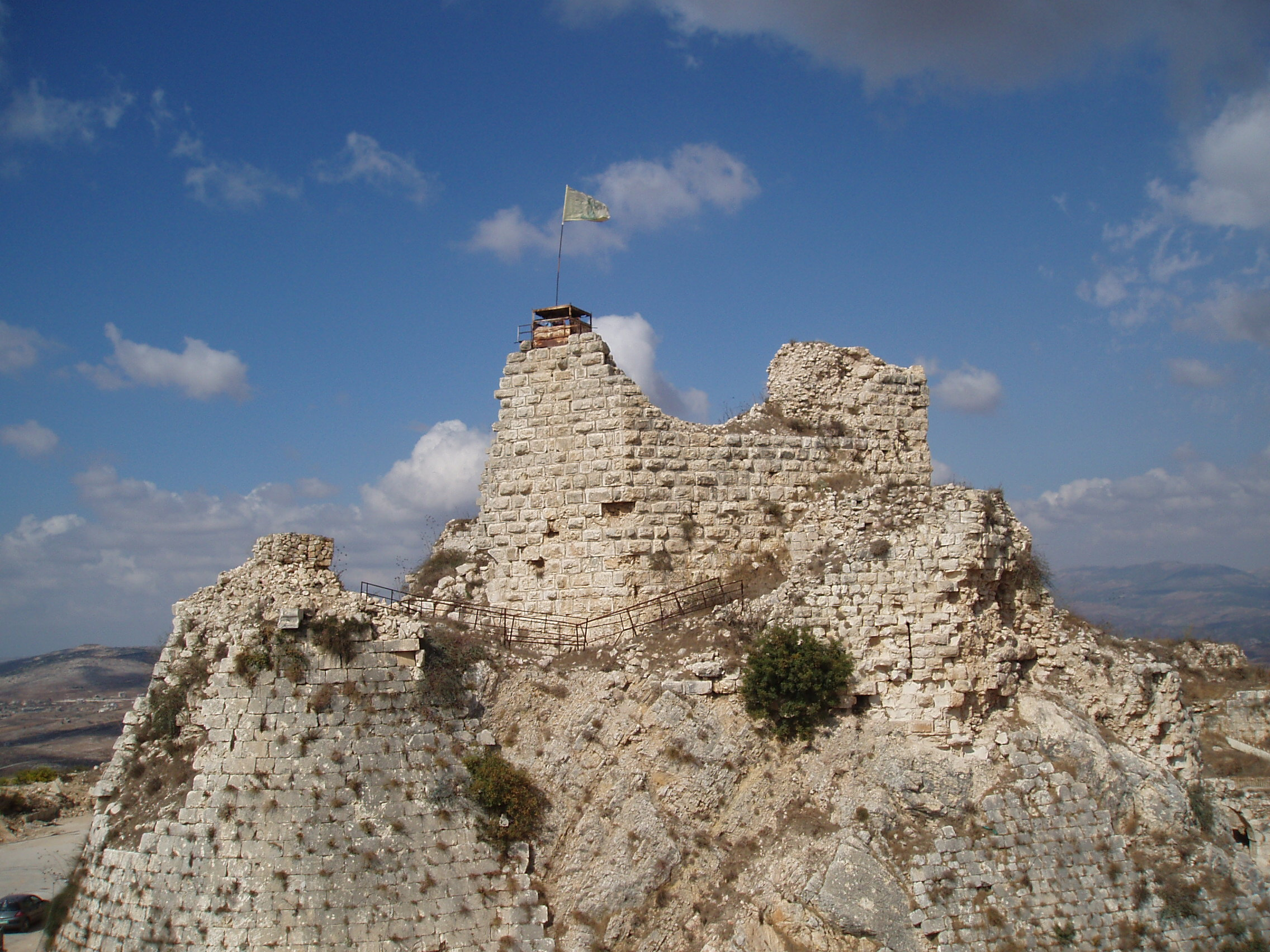
Shaqif Arnun was a stronghold of Fakhr al-Din, guarding his domains from the south.

Fakhr al-Din lost imperial favor with the death of Murad Pasha in July 1611 and the succession of Nasuh Pasha. By then the Porte, freed up from the wars with Austria and Iran and the Jelali revolts in Anatolia, had turned its attention to affairs in the Levant. The authorities had become wary of Fakhr al-Din's expanding territory, his alliance with Grand Duchy of Tuscany, his unsanctioned strengthening and garrisoning of fortresses and his employment of outlawed sekbans. Nasuh Pasha appointed Ahmed Pasha, the governor of Damascus, at the head of a large army to suppress Fakhr al-Din. The latter boarded a European ship and escaped to Livorno, Tuscany.

In Fakhr al-Din's absence his younger brother Yunus acted as head of the family in the Chouf. The Ma'ns' sekbans stationed in their headquarter village of Deir al-Qamar collaborated with Ahmed Pasha, prompting Yunus to abandon the village for Baakline. Ali Ma'n, meanwhile, was deserted by his bodyguard of sekbans in Mafraq in the Syrian Desert where he evaded Ahmed Pasha. The Ma'nid fortresses of Shaqif Arnun and Subayba, which the Ottomans sought to dismantle, were controlled by the family's sekbans led by Husayn Yaziji and Husayn Tawil, respectively; with the help of the rival Harfush dynasty of Baalbek, the sekban commanders arranged the two fortresses' demolition and were rewarded by the authorities. The Ma'ns were stripped of their governorships of Sidon-Beirut, Safed, and Keserwan, but Yunus retained the tax farm of the Chouf from the governor of the newly created Sidon Eyalet in 1614. Their Druze and Shia rivals re-emerged as the tax farmers and governors of their home districts in Mount Lebanon and Jabal Amil.

Although the Ma'ns' position was severely weakened, in 1615 political circumstances changed in their favor with Nasuh Pasha being executed, Ahmed Pasha being replaced by a friendly governor, the Sidon Eyalet being dissolved, and troops being withdrawn from Syria to fight on the Iranian front. Yunus and Ali were appointed to Safed and Sidon-Beirut, respectively, and shortly after both governorships were given to Ali. The Ma'ns then confronted their Druze rivals, namely Muzaffar al-Andari of the Jurd, the Arslan chief Muhammad ibn Jamal al-Din of Choueifat in the Gharb, and the Sawwafs of Chbaniyeh in the Matn. Ali and Yunus defeated them in four engagements in the Druze Mountain, at Ighmid, Ain Dara, Abeih and the spring of Naimeh on the coast south of Beirut. In the course of the fighting, they retook control of Beirut and the Keserwan. Afterward Ali awarded the Ma'ns' Tanukhid allies and relatives the tax farms of Beirut, the Gharb and the Jurd, and the Abu'l-Lama family the tax farm of the Matn.

Growing opposition to the Ma'ns by the Shias of Safed Sanjak culminated with their backing of Yaziji's efforts to replace Ali as sanjak-bey there and their alliance with the Harfushes in 1617–1618. Yaziji was killed almost immediately after taking up office in Safed in June 1618, and Ali was restored to the post. Meanwhile, tensions rose between the Ma'ns and their Tanukhid and Abu'l-Lama allies relating to property disputes in Beirut.

The Ottomans pardoned Fakhr al-Din and he returned to Mount Lebanon, arriving in Acre on 29 September 1618. Upon hearing of his return, the Ma'ns' Druze allies immediately reconciled with Ali and from that point there was no further active Druze opposition to Fakhr al-Din. Uneasy about the growing ties between the Harfushes and the Shia chiefs of Safed, he arrested the preeminent chief of the Shia in Jabal Amil, Ali Munkir, and released him after a ransom paid by Yunus al-Harfush. He moved to supervise the collection of taxes in Bilad Bishara in December, prompting the Shia notable families of Ali Saghir, Munkir, Shukr and Daghir to take refuge with Yunus al-Harfush and evade payment. Fakhr al-Din responded by destroying their homes. He then reconciled with the Jabal Amil chiefs and Shia levies thereafter joined his army in his later military campaigns.

Fakhr al-Din moved against the Sayfas in 1619, capturing and looted their stronghold of Hisn Akkar and four days later besieging Yusuf and the latter's Druze allies in the Krak des Chevaliers. He then sent a detachment to burn the Sayfas' home village of Akkar and gained the defection of the Sayfa forts of Byblos and Smar Jbeil. Fakhr al-Din was compelled by Ottoman pressure to lift the siege, but during the hostilities had gained control of the Byblos and Batroun nahiyas. Yusuf was dismissed in 1622 after failing to remit taxes to the Porte, but refused to hand over power to his replacement Umar Kittanji, who in turn requested Fakhr al-Din's military support. Fakhr al-Din complied in return for the iltizam of the Tripoli nahiyas of Dinniyeh, Bsharri and Akkar. Once Fakhr al-Din set out from Ghazir, Yusuf abandoned Tripoli for Akkar. The Emir thereafter sent his Maronite ally Abu Safi Khazen, the brother of his mudabbir (fiscal and political adviser, scribe) Abu Nadir Khazen, to occupy Maronite-populated Bsharri, thereby ending the rule of the local Maronite muqaddams established since the late 14th century. In 1623 Fakhr al-Din mobilized his forces in Bsharri in support of Yusuf's rebellious nephew Sulayman, who controlled Safita. Fakhr al-Din's intervention confirmed the Ma'ns as the practical overlords of Safita.

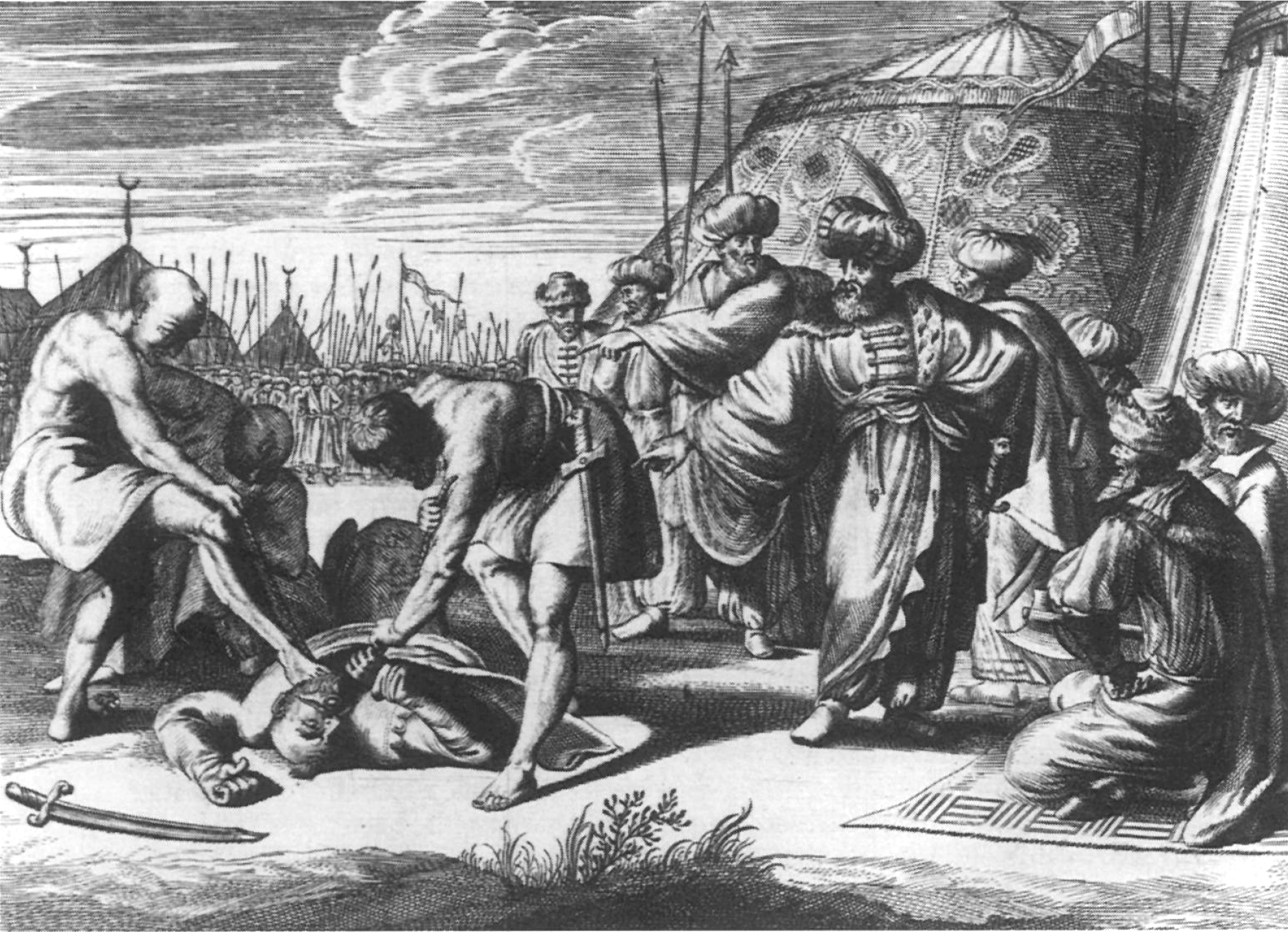
An engraving by Olfert Dapper from 1677 depicting Fakhr al-Din's capture of Mustafa Pasha, beylerbey of Damascus, at the Battle of Anjar in 1623. Fakhr al-Din is shown as the standing, turbaned figure pointing toward Mustafa Pasha, who is being held to the ground.

In August/September 1623 Fakhr al-Din evicted the Harfushes from the southern Beqaa village of Qabb Ilyas for their prohibition on the Chouf Druze from cultivating their fields there. Meanwhile, in June/July the Porte had replaced Ali Ma'n as sanjak-bey of Safed with a certain Bustanji Bashi and replaced his brother Husayn and the Ma'n loyalist Mustafa Kethuda as the sanjak-beys of Ajlun and Nablus with local opponents of the Ma'ns. The Porte soon after restored the Ma'ns to Ajlun and Nablus, but not to Safed. The Ma'ns thereupon moved to assume control of Ajlun and Nablus. Fakhr al-Din launched a campaign against the Turabays and Farrukhs in northern Palestine, but was defeated in a battle at the Awja River near Ramla. On his way back to Mount Lebanon from the abortive Palestine campaign, Fakhr al-Din was notified that the Porte reappointed his sons and allies to Safed, Ajlun and Nablus. The governor of Damascus, Mustafa Pasha, backed by the Harfushes and Sayfas, nonetheless proceeded to launch an expedition against the Ma'ns. Fakhr al-Din routed the Damascene force at Anjar and captured Mustafa Pasha. Fakhr al-Din extracted from the beylerbey confirmation of the Ma'ns' governorships and the additional appointments of himself over Gaza Sanjak, his son Mansur over Lajjun Sanjak, and Ali over the southern Beqaa nahiya. The appointments to Gaza, Nablus and Lajjun were not implemented due to the opposition of local powerholders. Fakhr al-Din plundered Baalbek soon after Anjar and captured and destroyed its citadel on 28 March. Yunus al-Harfush was executed in 1625, the same year that Fakhr al-Din gained the governorship of the Baalbek nahiya.

By 1624 Fakhr al-Din and his allies among the Sayfas who defected from Yusuf was in control of most of the Tripoli Eyalet, except for Tripoli city, the Krak des Chevaliers, the Koura nahiya, and the Jableh sanjak. A few months after Yusuf's death in July 1625, Fakhr al-Din launched an assault against Tripoli. He forced out his old ally Sulayman Sayfa from the Safita fortress and was later ceded the fortresses of Krak des Chevaliers and Marqab by Yusuf's sons. In September 1626 he captured the fortress of Salamiyah, followed by Hama and Homs, appointing his deputies to govern them. Fakhr al-Din was appointed beylerbey of Tripoli in 1627, according solely to Duwayhi. By the early 1630s Fakhr al-Din captured many places around Damascus, controlled thirty fortresses, commanded a large army of sekbans, and, according to a contemporary Ottoman historian, the "only thing left for him to do was to claim the Sultanate".

==== Druze power struggle ====
In 1660, the Ottoman Empire moved to reorganize the region, placing the sanjaks (districts) of Sidon-Beirut and Safed in a newly formed province of Sidon, a move seen by local Druze as an attempt to assert control. An Ottoman expedition was dispatched to the area following the creation of the new administrative units, initially against the Shihabs and the Shia Hamades. The reformer – grand wazir Köprülü Mehmed Pasha came in person with the expedition. The Shihabs fled to the Hamades in the high Kisrawan, while the Ottoman troops pillaged Wadi al-Taym.

Claiming that the Shihabs allied with the Ma'anis, the Ottomans demanded Ahmad and Korkmuz Ma'an to hand over the Shihabs and provide money for the Ottoman army, but the Ma'anis refused and fled to the Kisrawan as well. The Ma'anis lost control and the Druze of the Galilee lost their protection. Ottoman troops pillaged the area, seeking for the lords of Shihabs, Hamades and Ma'anis, causing "misery" to the peasants. As a result, the pro-Ottoman Druze overran much of the Galilee, most notably destroying the cities of Safed and Tiberias. Alternative pro-Ottoman sheikhs – Sirhal Imad and Ali Alam al-Din were briefly installed to rule the Druze country. Contemporary historian Istifan al-Duwayhi reports that Korkmaz was killed in act of treachery by the Beylerbey of Damascus in 1662. His brother Ahmad Ma'an apparently escaped the plotting. In 1666, according to al-Safa, local Shia repulsed the governor of Sidon and a Ma'an force near Nabatiyeh.

In 1667, Ahmad Ma'an and his supporters defeated the pro-Ottoman Alam al-Din, Sawaf and others, and termed Yamanis near Beirut. Ahmad Ma'an emerged victorious in the power struggle among the Druze in 1667, but the Maʿnīs lost control of Safad and retreated to controlling the iltizam of the Chouf mountains and Kisrawan, answerable to the Ottoman governor of Sidon. According to Abu-Husayn, after 1667 Ahmad Ma'an resumed correspondence with the Tuscans.

Ahmad continued as local ruler through his death from natural causes, without heir, in 1697. During the Ottoman–Habsburg War (1683–1699), Ahmad Ma'n collaborated in a rebellion against the Ottomans which extended beyond his death. Iltizam rights in Chouf and Kisrawan passed to the rising Shihab family through female-line inheritance. Despite conflicts in the 1660s, the Maan family "played the leading role in the management of the internal affairs of this eyalet until the closing years of the 17th century, perhaps because it was not possible to manage the province-certainly not in the sanjak of Sidon-Beirut-without them."

==== Chehab dynasty ====
In 17th-century Mount Lebanon, the Druze were the major demographic group of the region. The Druze had been divided into political factions based on the old Arab tribal divisions of the Qays and Yaman. The Ma'ans, whose emirs (princes) consistently held the tax farms of Mount Lebanon's districts (Chouf, Matn, Keserwan, Gharb and Jurd), represented the Qaysi faction, along with their allies, the Druze clans of Jumblatt, Imad, Talhuq and Abu'l Lama, the Maronite Khazen clan of Keserwan, and the Sunni Muslim Shihab clan of Wadi al-Taym. Leading the Yamani faction was the Druze Alam al-Din clan, whose members occasionally gained the tax farms of Mount Lebanon during times of conflict between the Ma'ans and the Ottoman authorities. Other families belonging to the Yamani faction were the Druze clans of Arslan and Sawaf.

In 1697, Emir Ahmad Ma'an died without a male heir, and as a result, the Druze sheikhs of the Qaysi faction decided to appoint a strong and unifying family to head the faction to prevent a potential Yamani rise to power. The Qaysi sheikhs ultimately chose Bashir Shihab I to succeed Emir Ahmad due to the military strength of the Shihab clan, their distance from the intra-Qaysi disputes, and their marital kinship with Emir Ahmad (Bashir was Ahmad's maternal nephew). The Ottoman authorities confirmed the Ma'an-Shihab transition, but decided to invest Emir Ahmad's tax farms to Emir Haydar Shihab (Emir Ahmad's grandson). Due to Emir Haydar's youth, Emir Bashir served as regent. Emir Bashir strengthened Qaysi dominance in Mount Lebanon and installed the Qaysi sheikh Umar al-Zaydani of the Sunni Muslim Zaydani clan as the tax farmer of Safad and its region, while securing the allegiance of the Shia Muslim Sa'b and Munkir clans of Jabal Amil (the Wa'il clan of Jabal Amil was pro-Yamani).

After Emir Bashir died, the Ottomans rescinded the power of the Shihabs in Jabal Amil (the Munkirs and Sa'bs then defected to the pro-Yamani coalition) and the Galilee. Moreover, in 1709, the Ottoman governor of Sidon Eyalet, which included Mount Lebanon, Beirut, Galilee and Jabal Amil, deposed Emir Haydar from the tax farm of Chouf and transferred to it Emir Haydar's erstwhile associate-turned-enemy, Mahmoud Abu Harmoush. Abu Harmoush joined forces with the Alam al-Din-led Yamani faction and the latter soon after gained dominance in Mount Lebanon. However, the popular support for the Yamani faction in Chouf was not deep. Abu Harmoush, with the backing of Sidon's governor, pursued Emir Haydar, who had since fled to Ghazir where he found protection from the Maronite Hubaysh clan. Ghazir was plundered and Emir Haydar fled northeast to Hermel in the northern Beqaa Valley.

===== Battle of Ain Dara =====
The Qaysi clans of Mount Lebanon sent appeals to Emir Haydar to return and restore their control over the region. Buoyed by the Qaysi rallying of support, Emir Haydar relocated to Matn in 1711 where he sought safe haven with the Abu'l Lama, who controlled the subdistrict. Emir Haydar and the Abu'l Lama mobilized their forces at the village of Ras al-Matn, where they were soon joined by the heads of the various Qaysi clans of Mount Lebanon and their forces. They included Sheikh Ali Jumblatt, Qabalan al-Qadi al-Tanukhi, Sayyid Ahmad Imad, Sheikh Ali Abi Nakad, Janbulat Abd al-Malik and Muhammad Talhuq. Hearing of the Qaysi mobilization, Abu Harmoush called on the Yamani nobles of the Alam al-Din and Arslan clans to mobilize at the Jurd village of Ain Dara, and they were also joined by the Shia Muslim Harfush clan of the Beqaa Valley.

The Ottoman governor of Sidon sent troops through Beirut to aid the Yamani coalition, while the governor of Damascus did the same, but his troops were led through the Beqaa Valley. Through these maneuvers, the Ottoman provincial authorities and the Yamani faction intended to launch a pincer assault against the Qaysi camp at Ras al-Matn. However, on 20 March, Emir Haydar launched an all-out assault against the Yamani camp at Ain Dara to preempt the arrival of Ottoman reinforcements and being subsequently attacked from different directions. In the ensuing battle, the Qaysi coalition dealt a blow to the Yamani camp, which suffered heavy casualties. Seven sheikhs of the Alam al-Din clan were killed, while Abu Harmoush was captured. Emir Haydar subsequently sent kind-worded notices to the governors of Sidon and Damascus, who ultimately accepted the Qaysi victory and withdrew their forces.

===== Power struggle for the emirate =====
Emir Haydar died in 1732 and was succeeded by his eldest son, Mulhim. One of Emir Mulhim's early actions was a punitive expedition against the Wa'il clan of Jabal Amil. The Wa'il kinsmen had painted their horses' tails green in celebration of Emir Haydar's death (Emir Haydar's relations with the Wa'il clan had been poor) and Emir Mulhim took it as a grave insult. In the ensuing campaign, the Wa'ili sheikh, Nasif al-Nassar, was captured, albeit briefly. Emir Mulhim had the support of Sidon's governor in his actions in Jabal Amil.

Beginning in the 1740s, a new factionalism developed among the Druze clans. One faction was led by the Jumblatt clan and was known as the Jumblatti faction, while the Imad, Talhuq and Abd al-Malik clans formed the Imad-led Yazbak faction. Thus Qaysi-Yamani politics had been replaced with the Jumblatti-Yazbaki rivalry. In 1748, Emir Mulhim, under the orders of the governor of Damascus, burned properties belonging to the Talhuq and Abd al-Malik clans as punishment for the Yazbaki harboring of a fugitive from Damascus Eyalet. Afterward, Emir Mulhim compensated the Talhuqs. In 1749, he succeeded in adding the tax farm of Beirut to his domain, after persuading Sidon's governor to transfer the tax farm. He accomplished this by having the Talhuq clan raid the city and demonstrate the ineffectiveness of its deputy governor.

Emir Mulhim became ill and was forced to resign in 1753 by his brothers, emirs Mansur and Ahmad, who were backed by the Druze sheikhs. Emir Mulhim retired in Beirut, but he and his son Qasim attempted to wrest back control of the emirate using his relationship with an imperial official. They were unsuccessful and Emir Mulhim died in 1759. The following year, Emir Qasim was appointed in place of Emir Mansur by the governor of Sidon. However, soon after, emirs Mansur and Ahmad bribed the governor and regained the Shihabi tax farm. Relations between the brothers soured as each sought paramountcy. Emir Ahmad rallied the support of the Yazbaki Druze, and was able to briefly oust Emir Mansur from the Shihabi headquarters in Deir al-Qamar. Emir Mansur, meanwhile, relied on the Jumblatti faction and the governor of Sidon, who mobilized his troops in Beirut in support of Emir Mansur. With this support, Emir Mansur retook Deir al-Qamar and Emir Ahmad fled. Sheikh Ali Jumblatt and Sheikh Yazbak Imad managed to reconcile emirs Ahmad and Mansur, with the former relinquishing his claim on the emirate and was permitted to reside in Deir al-Qamar.

Another son of Emir Mulhim, Emir Yusuf, had backed Emir Ahmad in his struggle and had his properties in Chouf confiscated by Emir Mansur. Emir Yusuf, who was raised as a Maronite Catholic but publicly presented himself as a Sunni Muslim, gained protection from Sheikh Ali Jumblatt in Moukhtara, and the latter attempted to reconcile Emir Yusuf with his uncle. Emir Mansur declined Sheikh Ali's mediation. Sa'ad al-Khuri, Emir Yusuf's mudabbir (manager), managed to persuade Sheikh Ali to withdraw his backing of Emir Mansur, while Emir Yusuf gained the support of Uthman Pasha al-Kurji, the governor of Damascus. The latter directed his son Mehmed Pasha al-Kurji, governor of Tripoli, to transfer the tax farms of Byblos and Batroun to Emir Yusuf in 1764. With the latter two tax farms, Emir Yusuf formed a power base in Tripoli's hinterland. Under al-Khuri's guidance and with Druze allies from Chouf, Emir Yusuf led a campaign against the Hamade sheikhs in support of the Maronite clans of Dahdah, Karam and Dahir and Maronite and Sunni Muslim peasants who, since 1759, were all revolting against the Hamade clan. Emir Yusuf defeated the Hamade sheikhs and appropriated their tax farms. This not only empowered Emir Yusuf in his conflict with Emir Mansur, but it also initiated Shihabi patronage over the Maronite bishops and monks who had resented Khazen influence over church affairs and been patronized by the Hamade sheikhs, the Shihab clan's erstwhile allies.

===== Reign of Yusef and Bashir Shihab II =====
In 1770, Emir Mansur resigned in favor of Emir Yusuf after being compelled to step down by the Druze sheikhs. The transition was held at the village of Barouk, where the Shihabi emirs, Druze sheikhs and religious leaders met and drew up a petition to the governors of Damascus and Sidon, confirming Emir Yusuf's ascendancy. Emir Mansur's resignation was precipitated by his alliance with Sheikh Zahir al-Umar, the Zaydani strongman of northern Palestine, and Sheikh Nasif al-Nassar of Jabal Amil in their revolt against the Ottoman governors of Syria. Sheikh Zahir and the forces of Ali Bey al-Kabir of Egypt had occupied Damascus, but withdrew after Ali Bey's leading commander, Abu al-Dhahab, who was bribed by the Ottomans. Their defeat by the Ottomans made Emir Mansur a liability to the Druze sheikhs vis-a-vis their relations with the Ottoman authorities, so they decided to depose him. Emir Yusuf cultivated ties with Uthman Pasha and his sons in Tripoli and Sidon, and with their backing, sought to challenge the autonomous power of sheikhs Zahir and Nasif. However, Emir Yusuf experienced a series of major setbacks in his cause in 1771. His ally, Uthman Pasha, was routed in the Battle of Lake Hula by Sheikh Zahir's forces. Afterward, Emir Yusuf's large Druze force from Wadi al-Taym and Chouf was routed by Sheikh Nasif's Shia cavalrymen at Nabatieh. Druze casualties during the battle amounted to some 1,500 killed, a loss similar to that suffered by the Yamani coalition at Ain Dara. Furthermore, the forces of sheikhs Zahir and Nasif captured the town of Sidon after Sheikh Ali Jumblatt withdrew. Emir Yusuf's forces were again routed when they attempt oust sheikhs Zahir and Nasif, who had key backing from the Russian fleet, which bombarded Emir Yusuf's camp.

Uthman Pasha, seeking to prevent Beirut's fall to Sheikh Zahir, appointed Ahmad Pasha al-Jazzar, who was formerly in Emir Yusuf's service, as garrison commander of the city. Emir Yusuf, as ta

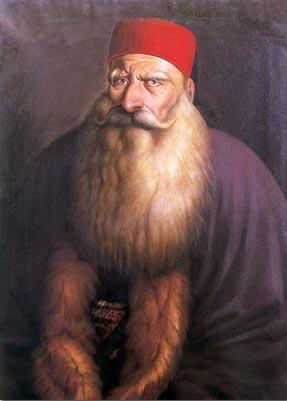
Bashir Shihab II was the Emir of Mount Lebanon from 1789 until 1840.

x farmer of Beirut, agreed to the appointment and declined a bounty on al-Jazzar by Abu al-Dhahab (al-Jazzar was wanted by the Mamluk strongmen of Ottoman Egypt). However, al-Jazzar soon began acting independently after organizing the fortifications of Beirut, and Emir Yusuf appealed to Sheikh Zahir through Emir Mansur's liaising to request Russian bombardment of Beirut and oust al-Jazzar. Sheikh Zahir and the Russians acceded to Emir Yusuf's request after a large bribe was paid to them. After a four-month siege, al-Jazzar withdrew from Beirut in 1772, and Emir Yusuf penalized his Yazbaki allies, sheikhs Abd al-Salam Imad and Husayn Talhuq to compensate for the bribe he paid to the Russians. The following year, Emir Yusuf's brother, Emir Sayyid-Ahmad, took control of Qabb Ilyas and robbed a group of Damascene merchants passing through the village. Emir Yusuf subsequently captured Qabb Ilyas from his brother, and was transferred the tax farm for the Beqaa Valley by the governor of Damascus, Muhammad Pasha al-Azm.

In 1775, Sheikh Zahir was defeated and killed in an Ottoman campaign, and al-Jazzar was installed in Sheikh Zahir's Acre headquarters, and soon after, was appointed governor of Sidon. Among al-Jazzar's principal goals was to centralize authority in Sidon Eyalet and assert control over the Shihabi emirate in Mount Lebanon. To that end, he succeeded in ousting Emir Yusuf from Beirut and removing it from the Shihabi tax farm. Moreover, al-Jazzar took advantage and manipulated divisions among the Shihab emirs to break up the Shihabi emirate into weaker entities that he could more easily exploit for revenue. In 1778 he agreed to sell the Chouf tax farm to Emir Yusuf's brothers, emirs Sayyid-Ahmad and Effendi after the latter two gained the support of the Jumblatt and Nakad clans (Emir Yusuf's ally Sheikh Ali Jumblatt died that year). Emir Yusuf, thereafter, based himself in Ghazir and mobilized the support of his Sunni Muslim allies, the Ra'ad and Mir'ibi clans from Akkar. Al-Jazzar restored the Chouf to Emir Yusuf after he paid a large bribe, but his brothers again challenged him 1780. That time they mobilized the support of both the Jumblatti and Yazbaki factions, but their attempt to kill Sa'ad al-Khuri failed, and Effendi was killed. In addition, Emir Yusuf paid al-Jazzar to loan him troops, bribed the Yazbaki faction to defect from his Sayyid-Ahmad's forces and once again secured control of the Shihabi emirate.

The most prominent among the Shihabi emirs was Emir Bashir Shihab II, who was comparable to Fakhr ad-Din II. His ability as a statesman was first tested in 1799, when Napoleon besieged Acre, a well-fortified coastal city in Palestine, about forty kilometers south of Tyre. Both Napoleon and Ahmad Pasha al-Jazzar, the governor of Sidon, requested assistance from Bashir, who remained neutral, declining to assist either combatant. Unable to conquer Acre, Napoleon returned to Egypt, and the death of Al-Jazzar in 1804 removed Bashir's principal opponent in the area. When Bashir II decided to break away from the Ottoman Empire, he allied himself with Muhammad Ali Pasha, the founder of modern Egypt, and assisted Muhammad Ali's son, Ibrahim Pasha, in another siege of Acre. This siege lasted seven months, the city falling on 27 May 1832. The Egyptian army, with assistance from Bashir's troops, also attacked and conquered Damascus on 14 June 1832.

In 1840, four of the principal European powers (Britain, Austria, Prussia, and Russia), opposing the pro-Egyptian policy of the French, signed the London Treaty with the Sublime Porte (the Ottoman ruler) on 15 July 1840. According to the terms of this treaty, Muhammad Ali was asked to leave Syria; when he rejected this request, Ottoman and British troops landed on the Lebanese coast on 10 September 1840. Faced with this combined force, Muhammad Ali retreated, and on 14 October 1840, Bashir II surrendered to the British and went into exile. Bashir Shihab III was then appointed. On 13 January 1842, the sultan deposed Bashir III and appointed Omar Pasha as governor of Mount Lebanon. This event marked the end of the rule of the Shihabs.

=== Double Qaim-Maqamate of Mount Lebanon ===
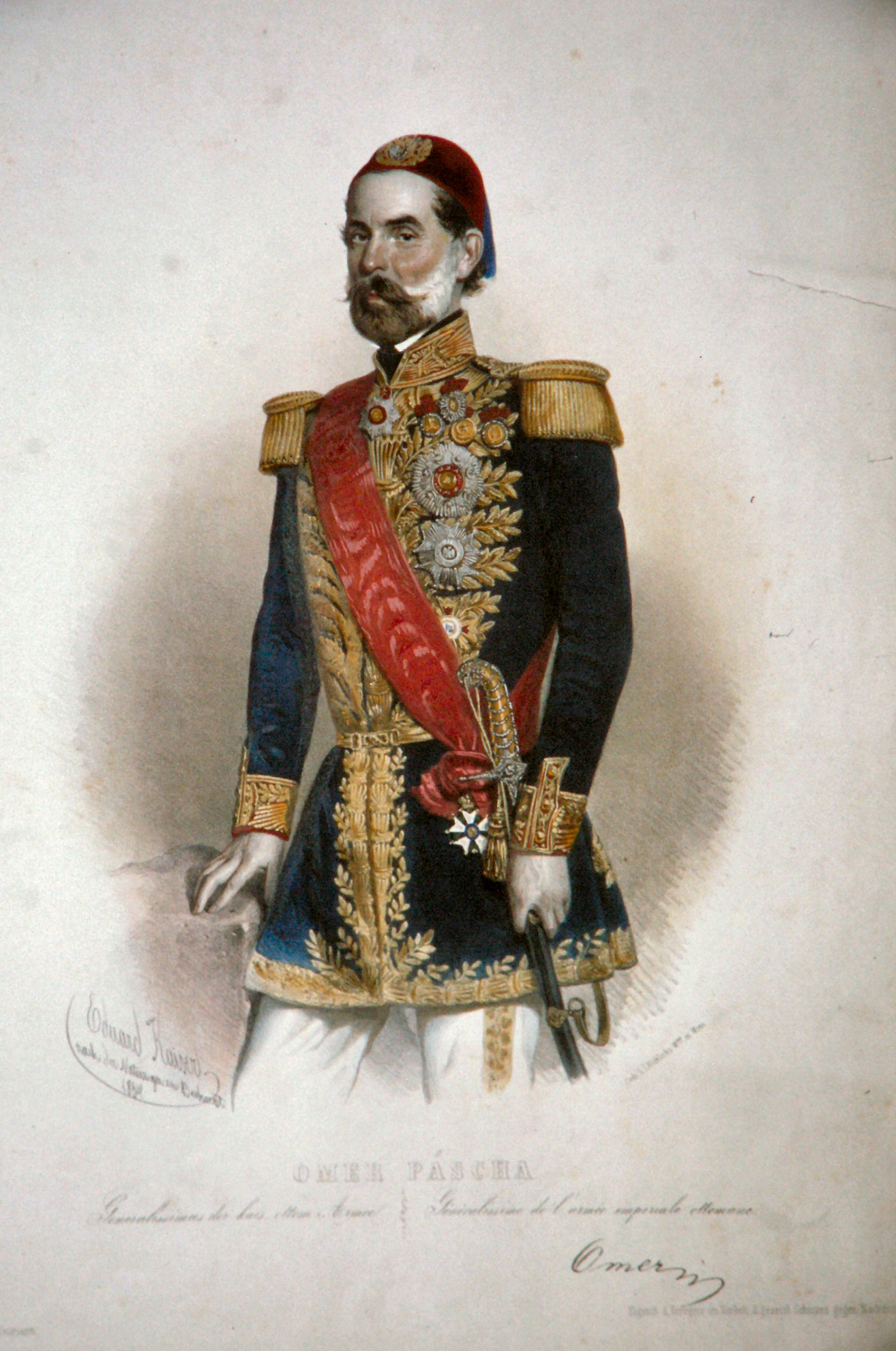
Omar Pasha – Lithograph

After the removal of Prince Bashir III, the Lebanese Shehab emirate, which had been the ruling entity of the country and its population for many years, collapsed. The Ottomans appointed one of the most senior officials as direct ruler on the mountain, with the ruler being a Sunni Muslim of Austrian origins named Omar Pasha, the Druze welcomed him and the Christians rejected him, and the majority of the Christians stood by the Maronite Patriarch Youssef Boutros Hobeish, who announced that he refused to cooperate with any non-Lebanese ruler or any ruler not chosen by the Lebanese themselves. The Pasha had hired agents to edit petitions that showed the people's support for him and their refusal to return to the Chehab rule. A number of people signed these petitions in exchange for a bribe, a promise or a threat, and some of them signed them with consent, when the matter of the petitions was exposed in Constantinople and the Porte got determined to dismiss the Austrian, the Pasha tried to lure the Druze to him and persuade them to fight the Christians population, but the Druze, feeling that the Pasha had taken advantage of them, led forces against him and almost stormed his palace, had it not been for a battalion of the Ottoman soldiers had rescued him, then he was sent to Beirut, where he was dismissed from his position, on the same day, the Porte and representatives of European countries reached in Constantinople a new project to govern Mount Lebanon, and to be implemented in early 1843.

After dismissing Omar Pasha of his position, the Ottoman government tried to appoint two non-Lebanese Ottoman rulers in his place, one on the south of the mountain, that is, on the Druze-majority side, and the other on the north of the mountain, that is, on the Christian-majority side, with the rulers being the subject of the Governor of Beirut, but the Europeans stood in the way of the Ottoman plan, as it entailed strengthening the Ottoman Islamic grip on Mount Lebanon, and since the influence of the Ottoman Empire was weakening at the time and unable to compete with the European influence, the Sultan accepted the proposals of representatives of the great powers to divide the mountain into a Christian and a Druze side and on 1 December 1843, the Sultan agreed to the proposal of Prince Metternich, Chancellor of Austria, and asked Asaad Pasha, the governor of Beirut, to divide Mount Lebanon into two provinces: a northern province ruled by a Christian Qa’im-Maqam and a southern province governed by a Druze Qa’im-Maqam, both of whom are chosen by the notables, and are subject to the Governor of Beirut, this system was later known as the double Qa’im-Maqamate system.

==== 1860 civil war ====
Bitter conflicts between Christians and Druzes, which had been simmering under Ibrahim Pasha's rule (mostly centred on the firmans of 1839 and, more decisively, of 1856, which equalised the status of Muslim and non-Muslim subjects, the former resenting their implied loss of superiority) resurfaced under the new emir. The sultan deposed Bashir III on 13 January 1842 and appointed Omar Pasha as governor of Mount Lebanon. Representatives of the European powers proposed to the sultan that Mount Lebanon be partitioned into Christian and Druze sections. On 7 December 1842, the sultan adopted the proposal and asked the governor of Damascus to divide the region into two districts: a northern district under a Christian deputy governor and a southern district under a Druze deputy governor. The arrangement came to be known as the "Double Qaimaqamate". Both officials were to be responsible to the governor of Sidon, who resided in Beirut. The Beirut-Damascus highway was the dividing line between the two districts.

While the Ottoman authorities pursued a divide-and-rule strategy, various European powers established alliances with the various religious groups in the region. The French established an alliance with the Lebanese Christians, while the Druze formalized an alliance with the British, allowing them to send Protestant missionaries into the region. The increasing tensions led to an outbreak of conflict between Christians and Druzes as early as May 1845. Consequently, the European great powers requested for the Ottoman sultan to establish order in Lebanon, and he attempted to do so by establishing a new council in each of the districts. Composed of members of the various religious communities, the councils were intended to assist the deputy governor. The system failed to keep order when the peasants of Keserwan, overburdened by heavy taxes, rebelled against the feudal practices that prevailed in Mount Lebanon. In 1858, Tanyus Shahin, a Maronite Christian peasant leader, demanded for the feudal class to abolish its privileges. The demand was refused, and the peasants began to prepare for a revolt. In January 1859, an armed uprising, led by Shahin, was launched against the Maronite Khazen muqata'jis (feudal lords) of Keserwan. Khazen lands were pillaged and homes burned. After driving the Maronite feudal lords out of Keserwan and seizing their land and property, the insurgent peasants set up their own rule. The Keserwan uprising had a revolutionary effect on other regions in Lebanon. The disturbances spread to Latakia and to central Mount Lebanon. Maronite peasants, actively supported by their clergy, began to prepare for an armed uprising against their Druze lords. In turn, the Druze lords, who had been hesitant to confront the growing assertiveness of the Maronite peasantry due to the numerical imbalance in the Maronites' favour, began to arm Druze irregulars.

In August 1859, a brawl occurred between Druze and Maronites in the Metn area in the Christian sector of the Qaimaqamate. The dispute enabled Maronite bishop Tobia Aoun to mobilise his Beirut-based central committee to intervene in the matter. Soon, a Druze muqata'ji of the Yazbaki faction, Yusuf Abd al-Malik, and his fighters intervened in a brawl between young Maronite and Druze men in the vicinity of the Metn village of Beit Mery, which resulted in 20 fatalities. The Druze lords began making war preparations, allegedly in co-ordination with the local Ottoman authorities, while Bishop Aoun oversaw the distribution of weapons to Maronite peasants. According to the historian William Harris, the Christians of Mount Lebanon felt "buoyed by their local numerical superiority, yet despondent because of the hostile Muslim mood in Syria" in the aftermath of the Ottoman Empire's reforms.

In March, April and May 1860, numerous acts of murder, looting and skirmishing took place across the mixed Christian-Druze districts of southern Mount Lebanon in the Druze-run sector of the Double Qaimaqamate. According to the historian Leila Terazi Fawaz, the initial acts were "random and unpredictable enough to seem more the acts of lawless men than a calculated war against other sects, especially since banditry was always part of the objective".

==== Deir el-Qamar massacre ====
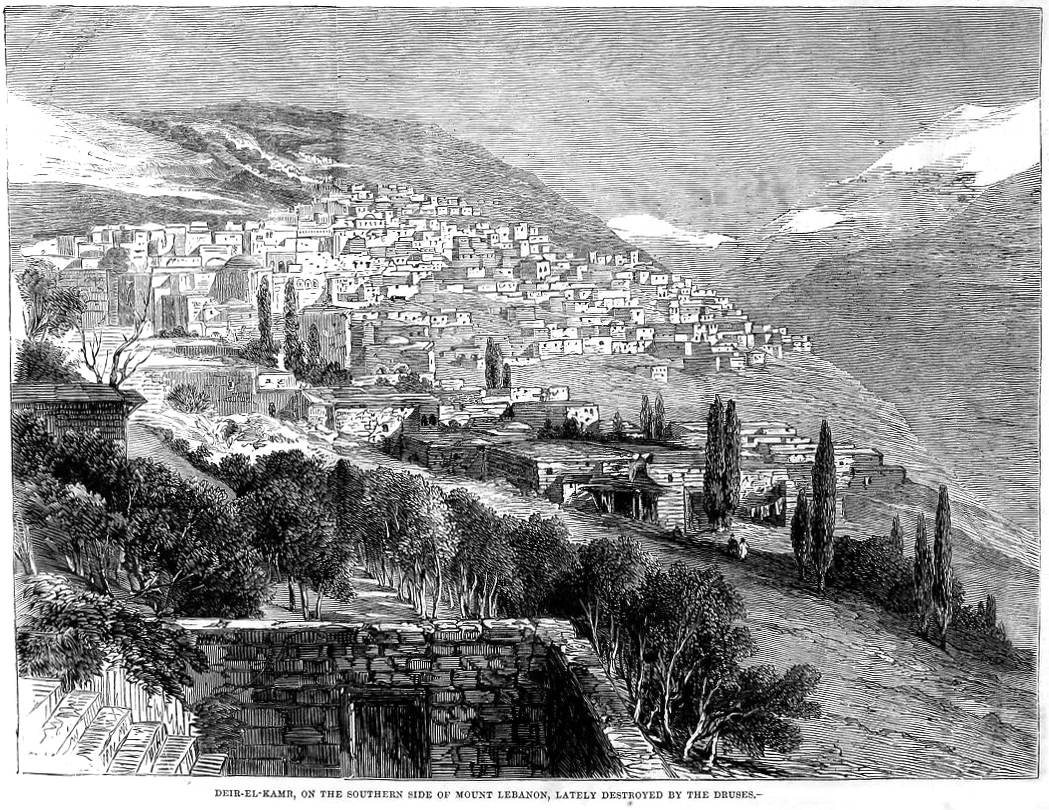
Sketch of Deir al-Qamar from an English newspaper published in July 1860

Deir al-Qamar had already been captured by Druze forces and its residents had consistently appealed for protection from their friends among the local Druze and from the Ottoman authorities. Nonetheless, following their decisive victory at Zahle, the Druze renewed their assault against Deir al-Qamar on 20 June. In the weeks prior, some of the town's wealthier residents managed to leave for Beirut or gained Sa'id Jumblatt's protection in Moukhtara. However, thousands of Christians remained in Deir al-Qamar and the Druze militiamen were preventing many from leaving. As Druze fighters moved in on the town, ostensibly guarding homes and shops, they proceeded to loot many buildings that had been abandoned by their patrons. The Christian residents did not put up armed resistance against the Druze fighters, and sometime before 20 June the Christians had been disarmed either at the counsel of the district governor Mustafa Shukri Effendi or an Ottoman general from the Beirut garrison named Tahir Pasha. The Ottomans' advice to the Christians regarding disarmament was that it would help in not provoking the Druze.

On the evening of 19 June, a Christian resident and a priest were killed outside the government house in Deir al-Qamar, where thousands of residents had begun taking refuge. Hundreds of others took shelter in the abandoned Ottoman barracks at Beit ed-Dine or the district governor's residence. Meanwhile, Druze fighters from Moukhtara, Baakline, Ain al-Tineh, Arqub district, Manasif district, Boutmeh, Jdaideh, Shahahir, and Ammatour were streaming into Deir al-Qamar from several directions. At least part of these forces were commanded by Sheikh Qasim Imad. The roughly 4,000 Ottoman troops stationed in Deir al-Qamar did not stop the incoming Druzes. On the morning of 20 June, the Druzes assaulted the government house and proceeded to kill the males taking refuge in it, all of whom were unarmed. European consuls who witnessed the killings or their aftermath reported that many women were assaulted as well in an unprecedented manner. Afterwards, the Druzes plundered Deir al-Qamar, which was well known for being wealthy. Unlike in Zahle, the Druzes looted large quantities of horses, livestock, jewellery and other goods. Large parts of the town were burned down. Other Christians were killed throughout Deir al-Qamar.

Nearby Beit ed-Dine and its countryside was also sacked. The plunder in Deir al-Qamar ended on 23 June, after intervention by Sa'id Jumblatt, Bashir Nakad, sheikhs from the Hamada clan, and an Ottoman colonel. By the end of the fighting, much of Deir al-Qamar, which was the most prosperous town of the predominantly Druze Chouf district, was in ruins, and corpses, some mutilated, were left throughout the town's streets, markets, houses and Ottoman government buildings and military installations. Between 1,200 and 2,200 Christians had been killed in the onslaught and many more had fled. By October 1860, Deir al-Qamar's population which had been roughly 10,000 before the conflict, had been reduced to 400. According to Fawaz, the ceasefire negotiated between by the Druze sheikhs and the authorities marked the "end to the most violent phase of the civil war" in Mount Lebanon.

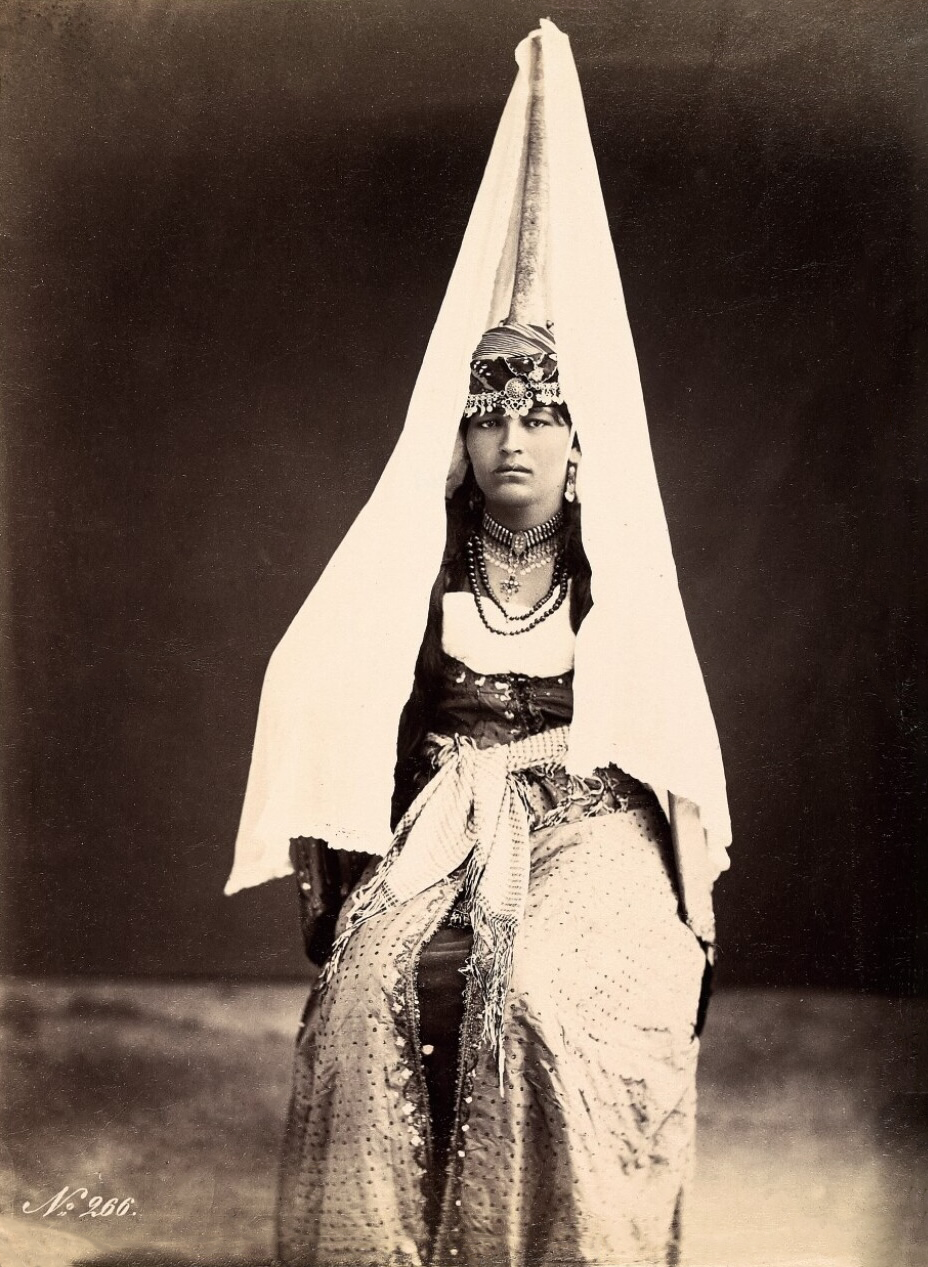
Tantour on a Druze woman in Chouf, Lebanon – 1870s. It is the traditional women's dress in Lebanon. This costume was no longer common in the coastal towns of Lebanon after 1840, and had become extinct in the mountain by the late 19th century.

=== Mount Lebanon Mutasarrifate ===
On 5 September 1860, an international commission composed of France, Britain, Austria, Prussia, Russia and the Ottoman Empire met to investigate the causes of the events of 1860 and to recommend a new administrative and judicial system for Lebanon that would prevent the recurrence of such events. The mission of the committee included three fields: establishing security, punishing the guilty, providing relief and compensation to the afflicted, and establishing a new system of government in Lebanon. However, Fuad Pasha did not leave the committee much room to work in the first two fields, because he had established security, punished the guilty and provided some relief to the afflicted before the arrival of the international delegates to Beirut. Therefore, the committee spent little time on these matters, before moving on to the issue of the system of government, the preparation of which accounted for most of the delegates' efforts and time.

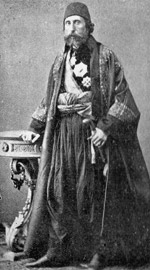
Garabet Artin Pasha Davoudian, also known as Daoud Pasha

After several sessions that lasted a few months, the six countries participating in the committee agreed to make Mount Lebanon a "Mutasarrifate" and to narrow its borders by removing the cities of Beirut, Tripoli, Sidon, Tyre, Akkar, the Bekaa, Marjayoun and Jabal Amel, and to be governed by a non-Lebanese and non-Turkish Ottoman Christian administrator appointed by the Sublime Porte with the approval of the five countries.

In the 1861 "Règlement Organique", Mount Lebanon was preliminarily separated from Syria and reunited under a non-Lebanese Christian mutasarrıf (governor) appointed by the Ottoman sultan, with the approval of the European powers. Mount Lebanon became a semi-autonomous mutasarrifate. In September 1864, the statute became permanent. The mutasarrıf was to be assisted by an administrative council of twelve members from the various religious communities in Lebanon. Each of the six religious groups inhabiting the Lebanon (Maronites, Druzes, Sunni, Shi’a, Greek Orthodox and Melkite Catholic) elected two members to the council.

==== 19th century ====
As soon that Daoud Pasha assumed his position in Deir al-Qamar, several feudal lords and clerics opposed him, he was able to satisfy them by appointing them to senior positions in the government of Mount Lebanon. But Youssef Karam, one of the young sheikhs of the town of Ehden and one of the national leaders, who was calling for the restoration of national rule, stood in the face of Daoud Pasha stubbornly and resisted him vehemently, and refused the positions he was offered. The members of the International Committee promised him to reconsider his demands, and persuaded him to calm down until the end of Daoud Pasha's term, the rebel was taken by Foreign Minister Fuad Pasha to be exiled to Turkey.

In the year 1864, when some articles of the Basic Law were amended, and the mandate of Daoud Pasha was renewed for five years, contrary to what Youssef Bey Karam expected, he left Turkey for Ehden and declared his opposition to the Mutasarrifate government and allied himself with Prince Salman ibn Melhem Al-Harfushi, he gathered around him men for the resistance, and many battles took place between him and the soldiers of the Mutasarrif. Finally, he went at the head of a force to Beiteddine to overthrow the Mutasarrifate government, and while he was on his way to Beiteddine, the Consul of France intervened and convinced him that he should stop resisting, otherwise the signatory states would have to help the Mutasarrifate. At that time, Youssef Bey Karam decided to leave Lebanon, he traveled to France and Belgium, and finally settled in Italy, where he died in 1889, his embalmed body was taken to the town of Ehden, where it is still preserved in its church in a glass box.

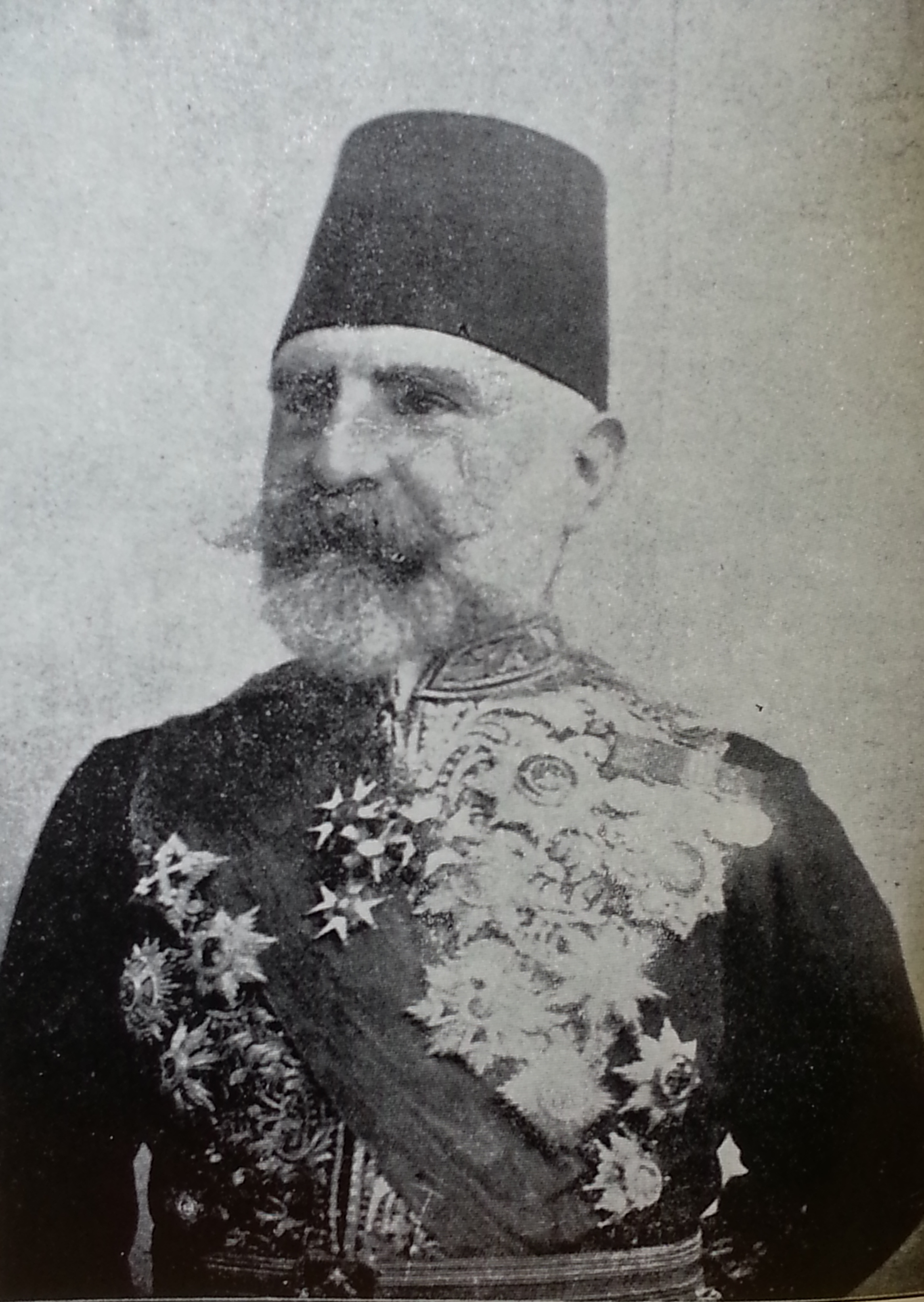
Na'ūm Bāsha

Vaso Pashë Shkodrani, a writer of Catholic Albanian Shkodran origin, ruled as Mutasarrif of Mount Lebanon in the early years of his tenure firmly, impartially and justly, he was a passionate reformer and was willing to improve the conditions of Mount Lebanon, preserving its autonomy and the dignity of its population, preventing the consuls of countries from interfering in its affairs, and was sincere in loyalty to the Sultan and the Ottoman government at the same time. He carried out several construction works, established a hospital in Beiteddine, expanded the Baabda Seraglio and made it the permanent winter-lodging place for the districts of the Mutasarrifate, he also built the Seraglio of Zahle, and began constructing a Seraglio in Jounieh, he also built roads and bridges, and was the first ruler to excavate antiquities.

During his reign, the Ottoman government adopted a modern system of the judiciary, this system was ordered for application in Lebanon, in violation of the Basic Law. The Lebanese objected to the new system, because it made Constantinople a center for the Court of cassation, and considered this an attempt to weaken the independence of the Lebanese judiciary, and as a burden on the Lebanese, who had to return to Constantinople in their cases, when in the past they all ended in Lebanon. In the last years of his tenure, chaos prevailed alongside corruption, bribery spread, and European interference in the affairs of the Mutasarrifate increased more than before, positions and ranks were sold to the person who increased the price the most to the son-in-law of the Mutasarrif and his wife. This situation prompted the Lebanese to demand the punishment of those responsible of corruption, however, Wassa Pasha died in 1892, eleven months before the end of his term.

Naum Basha then succeeded Vaso Pashë Shkodrani after his death. He began his tenure by reforming the administration, dismissing employees who were accused of bribery. And he organized the mutasarrifate's finances. Naoum Pasha launched several construction works, repairing bridges, constructing more than 480 kilometers of roads, and erecting several Seraglio in Baakleen, Chouf, Jezzine, Jounieh, Batroun, Amioun and Bhannes. His reign was characterized by security, calm, and stability, and during this period, migration from Mount Lebanon to abroad began on a large scale. He was known for treating both Christians and Muslims equally, he returned to Constantinople after the end of his mandate in 1902.

==== 20th century ====
When the Ottoman constitution was published in 1908, some groups in Lebanon demanded that the Mutasarrifate be included in the Wilayah of Syria and that two members would be sent to represent it in the "Chamber of Deputies" (the Ottoman parliament that was established under the new constitution). However, the strong resistance that arose against this idea did not allow it to come into being, despite the encouragement of Yusuf Franco Pasha. His constant conflict with members of the Administrative Council was the cause of the public's resentment against him, and this resentment did not subside until the end of his term of office in 1912. One of the prominent events that occurred during the era of the Mutasarrif was the introduction of the first modern car into Beirut from Alexandria on 24 June 1908, it crossed the Beirut-Sidon road in two and a third hours, which astonished the population of Lebanon at the time.

==== Famine ====
About half the population of the Mount Lebanon subdivision, overwhelmingly Maronites, starved to death (200,000 killed out of 400,000 of the total populace) throughout the years of 1915–1918 during what is now known as the great famine Mount of Lebanon. As a consequence of a mixed combination of crop failure, punitive governance practices, naval blockade of the coast by the Allies, and an Ottoman military ban on exports from Syria into Lebanon, during World War I. Dead bodies were piled in the streets and starving Lebanese civilians were reported to be eating street animals while some even resorted to cannibalism.

== French rule ==
=== World War II ===
WWII mostly effected the Chouf in the coastal town of Damour in the Battle of Damour. In 1941, Damour was the French administrative capital.

Damour is a large town on the coast of Lebanon and is approximately 30 kilometres south of Beirut. The Wadi Damour, with the Damour River in its bed, was a further three kilometres to the south of the town. These features were the last major natural obstacles that had to be crossed prior to reaching Beirut. Having already captured the heights overlooking Damour on the south bank of the wadi, the plan developed by Major General Arthur "Tubby" Allen, commanding the 7th Australian Division, involved encircling the Vichy French positions at Damour.

On the night of 5 July 1941, the operation began with troops of the 21st Brigade moving into position to cross the Damour River in two places.

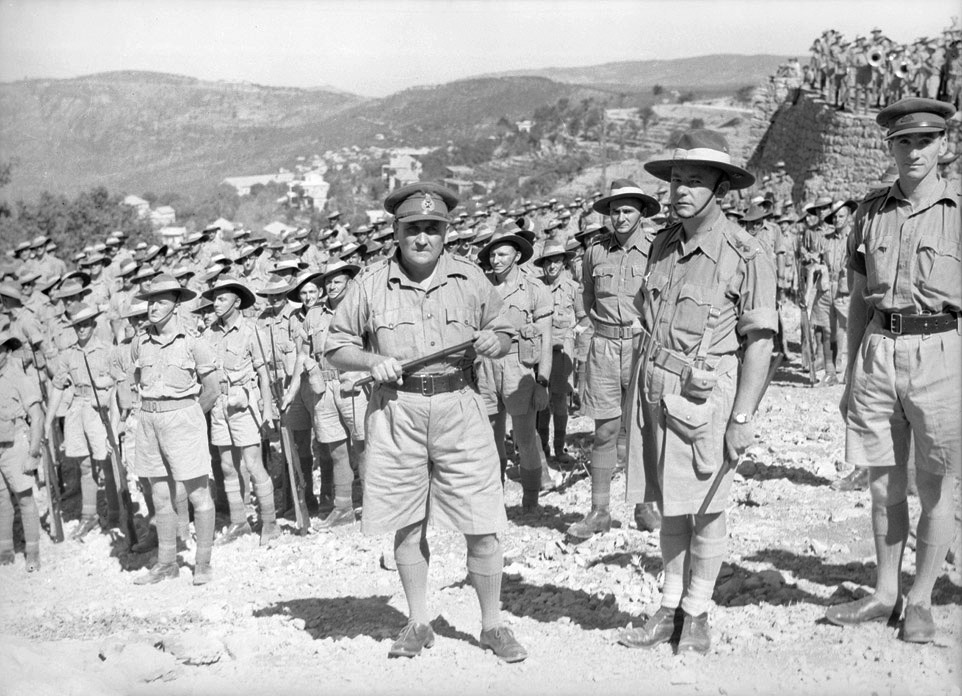
Hammana, Lebanon. 2 September 1941. Maj. Gen. A. S. "Tubby" Allen (centre), commander of the 7th Division, with Lt Col. Murray Moten (centre right), commander of the 2/27th Infantry Battalion and his men. (Photographer: Frank Hurley.)

Early on 6 July, the Australians attacked Vichy French positions on the northern side. The 2/16th Battalion attacked at El Atiqa. The 2/27th Battalion attacked at El Boum. By nightfall, both positions were in Australian hands.

In the early hours of 7 July, the 2/3rd Battalion and the 2/5th Battalion, along with two companies of the 2/14th Battalion, moved northwards through El Boum. They outflanked Damour to the east. At Daraya, the 2/14th companies swung west to advance on Damour from the east, while the 2/3rd Battalion and the 2/5th Battalion continued north to cut the road to Beirut north of the town.

On 8 July, the Australians accomplished cutting the road. In the south, the 2/2nd Pioneer Battalion and elements of the 6th Divisional Cavalry Regiment were advancing along the axis of the coastal road.

By 2 am on 9 July, the Pioneers were advancing into the southern outskirts of the town. At 4 am a patrol from the cavalry were able to drive right through Damour. The remaining Vichy French forces had managed to slip out of the Australian encirclement and had withdrawn from Damour. The Australians immediately began pushing along the coastal road towards Beirut.

On 8 July, even before the fall of Damour, the Vichy French commander, General Henri Dentz, had sought an armistice. At one minute past midnight on 12 July a ceasefire came into effect. For all intents and purposes, this ended the campaign.

== Independence ==
In 1958, during the last months of President Camille Chamoun's term, an insurrection broke out, and 5,000 United States Marines were briefly dispatched to Beirut on 15 July in response to an appeal by the government. After the crisis, a new government was formed, led by the popular former general Fuad Chehab.

During the 1960s, Lebanon enjoyed a period of relative calm, with Beirut-focused tourism and banking sector-driven prosperity. Lebanon reached the peak of its economic success in the mid-1960s—the country was seen as a bastion of economic strength by the oil-rich Persian Gulf Arab states, whose funds made Lebanon one of the world's fastest growing economies. This period of economic stability and prosperity was brought to an abrupt halt with the collapse of Yousef Beidas' Intra Bank, the country's largest bank and financial backbone, in 1966.

=== Chim earthquake ===
The 1956 Chim earthquake was a destructive multiple-shock event that occurred on 16 March in Lebanon along a strand of the Dead Sea Transform (DST) fault system. The epicenter was located in the south of Lebanon in the Chouf District. Six thousand homes were destroyed and another 17,000 were damaged. The number of persons killed was 136. The Roum fault runs for a length of 35 kilometers (22 mi) between the Hula basin the Awali river and is the westernmost strand of the fault system in that area. A paleoseismic trench investigation revealed that it may have been the source of the twin-shock event.

The twin shocks were separated by less than fifteen minutes with the first event occurring at 19:32 and the second event at 19:43 hours. The initial shock was estimated to measure (M_{w} = 5.3) and the second event was rated (M_{w} = 5.5).

=== Chamoun-Jumblatt rivalry ===
During the 1968 parliamentary elections in the Chouf district, Camille Chamoun sought re-election. His Maronite running mates were Sami al-Bustani and Halim al-Ghafari. Al-Bustani was an incumbent parliamentarian from the National Liberal Party. Professionally he was an engineer. The lawyer al-Ghafari contested elections for the first time.

Jumblatt fielded three Maronites linked to the National Struggle Front, out of whom one (Aziz Awn) was an incumbent parliamentarian since 1960. The 65-year-old Awn was a physician by profession. The two other Maronite candidates of the National Struggle Front, Suleiman al-Bustani and Fu'ad at-Tahini, were lawyers by profession. Kamal Jumblatt was a traditional Druze leader and landlord. At the time of the 1968 elections, he had only lost his parliamentary seat once. His Druze running mate was Bahij Taqiuddin, lawyer, former minister and incumbent parliamentarian linked to the National Struggle Front. Chamoun's two Druze candidates were the landlord Muhammad Arslan and the engineer Qathan Himadih (the latter was informally linked to the National Liberal Party).

=== Lebanese civil war ===
==== Sectarian conflict and massacres of Christians ====
Between March and August 1977 a series of massacres on Christian civilians took place in the Chouf region during the Lebanese Civil War. The massacres were mostly committed by Druze gunmen of the People's Liberation Army after the assassination of Druze leader Kamal Jumblatt. Many victims were mutilated and women were reportedly sexually abused.

On 16 March 1977, the PSP leader Kamal Jumblatt was ambushed and killed in his car near Baakline in the Chouf by unidentified gunmen (allegedly, fighters from the pro-Syrian faction of the Syrian Social Nationalist Party, acting in collusion with the Syrian military commander of the Mount Lebanon region, Colonel Ibrahim Houeijy); believing that the perpetrators were members of the predominately Christian Phalangist Kataeb Regulatory Forces (KRF) or Tigers Militias, PLF militiamen extracted swift retribution on the local Maronite population living in the intermixed towns and villages around Baakline. Despite the hasty dispatch on 17 March of 4,000 Syrian Army troops from the Arab Deterrent Force (ADF) to keep the peace in the Chouf, it is estimated that about 177–250 Maronite villagers were killed in reprisal actions at the towns of Moukhtara and Barouk, and at the villages of Mazraat el-Chouf, Maaser el-Chouf, Botmeh, Kfar Nabrakh, Machghara and Brih (St George's Church attack).

==== Israeli invasion ====
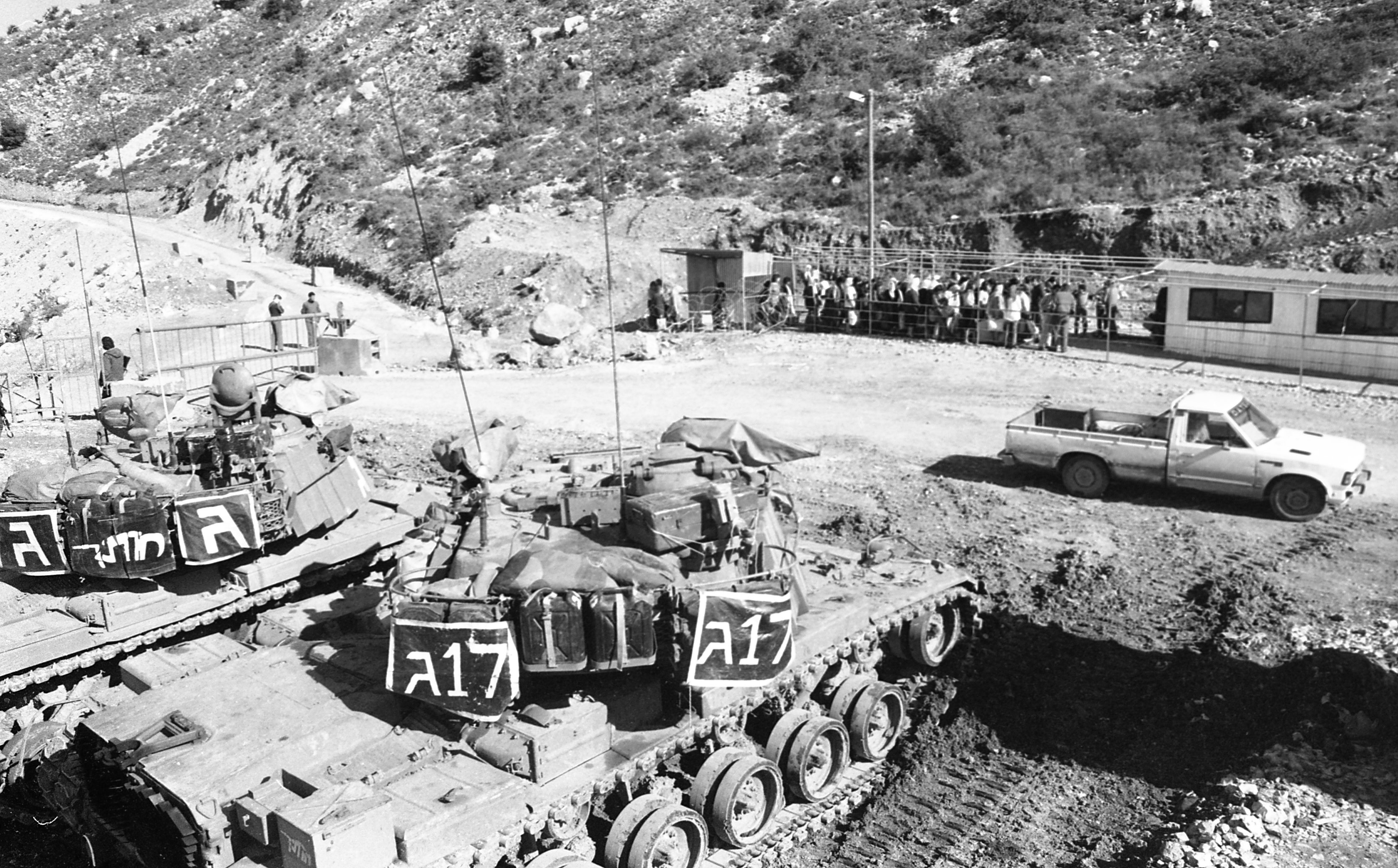
IDF checkpoint in the Chouf, 1984

On 6 June 1982, Israeli forces under direction of Defense Minister Ariel Sharon launched a three-pronged invasion of southern Lebanon in "Operation Peace for Galilee". Roughly 60,000 troops and more than 800 tanks, heavily supported by aircraft, attack helicopters, artillery, and missile boats, crossed the Israel–Lebanon border in three areas. Simultaneously, Israeli armor, paratroopers, and naval commandos set sail in amphibious landing ships from Ashdod towards the Lebanese coast north of Sidon. Israel's publicly stated objective was to push PLO forces back 40 kilometers (25 mi) to the north. The westernmost Israeli force was to advance up the coastal road to Tyre. Its mission was to bypass Tyre and destroy three PLO camps in the area, then move up the coast towards Sidon and Damour, while Israeli forces would simultaneously conduct an amphibious landing north of Sidon to cut off the retreat of PLO forces there. In the center, two divisions were to advance both north and south of the high ground overlooked by Beaufort Castle, which was being used as a PLO stronghold, and take the road junction at Nabatieh, while an elite reconnaissance battalion was to take the castle itself. The two divisions were then to split, with one heading west to link up with the forces along the coast, and another towards Jezzine and from there along the right flank of Syrian forces in the Bekaa Valley. The easternmost Israeli force, the largest of the three, advanced into the Bekaa Valley. Its mission was to prevent Syrian reinforcements from being sent and to stop Syrian forces from attempting to interfere with the operation on the coastal road.

==== Further sectarian conflict ====
After the Lebanese Army regained control of west Beirut, Lt. Gen. Tannous turned his attention to the Chouf District and on 18 October, his troops began to reassert their presence in the region. However, they were unable to stop the ongoing Christian-Druze clashes, mostly due to Israeli presence in the area, which tended to restrict Lebanese government' forces activity.

In November, fighting in the Chouf spread into the south-western suburbs of Beirut and friction in the Lebanese Capital increased after 1 December, when the Druze PSP leader Walid Jumblatt was injured in an assassination attempt by a car-bomb explosion outside his residence. On 20 December fighting broke out again between the Christian LF and the Druze PSP/PLA militias at the town of Aley which rumbled on until 7 February 1983, when the Druze overrun the town and drove out the Christian garrison.

On 18 April a suicide bomber drove a delivery van packed with explosives into the lobby of the U.S. Embassy at west Beirut, killing 63 people – among the dead were Robert Ames, a senior Central Intelligence Agency (CIA) analyst, and six personnel from the CIA station in Lebanon. Responsibility was claimed by the hitherto unknown Islamic Jihad Organization (IJO), a Lebanese Shi'ite militia supported by Iran and based near Baalbek in the Syrian-controlled Beqaa Valley. This attack inaugurated the saga of suicide car- and truck-bombings in Lebanon.

On 28 April, the fighting between Christian LF and Druze PSP/PLA militias resumed in the Chouf and in the northern part of the Matn District, spilling over into the southern suburbs of east Beirut, which were bombarded by Druze artillery batteries positioned at Dhour El Choueir, Arbaniyeh, Salimeh and Maaroufiyeh in the Baabda District. Fighting in the Chouf spilled over again into Beirut, this time in the form of further artillery shelling by the Druze PLA between 5 and 8 May.

As a result, internal political and armed opposition to the weak Gemayel administration grew intensively throughout the country. On 22 May, a number of clashes occurred in the Chouf Mountains, as the Druze PSP/PLA militia moved to expel the Lebanese Forces from their remaining positions in the area. Despite the heavy presence of IDF units in the region, the Israelis had little interest at getting involved in the Lebanese inter-sectarian strife, and made no attempt to intervene in the behalf of their LF allies. At the same time, the Lebanese central government was planning to re-impose its authority over the Chouf District, and on 9–10 July, LAF troops occupied an observation post recently abandoned by the IDF, located on the hills to the east of Beirut. President Gemayel and Lt. Gen. Tannous wanted to step up full deployment of combat units of the reformed Lebanese Armed Forces to the area, to act as a buffer between the LF and the PSP. This was objected by the Druze leader Walid Jumblatt, who accused the LAF of primarily serving the Kataeb interests, and began to re-organize and re-arm his PLA militia with Syrian material help. As relations between Lebanese President Gemayel and Israeli Defense Minister Ariel Sharon deteriorated, the IDF was accused of turning a blind eye to the Druze military build-up in the Chouf by doing nothing to impede Syrian arms shipments' convoys bound for the Druze militias from passing through their checkpoints in the region.

On 23 July, Jumblatt announced the formation of a Syrian-backed coalition, the Lebanese National Salvation Front (LNSF) that rallied several Lebanese Muslim and Christian parties and militias opposed to 17 May Agreement, and fighting between the Druze PLA and LF and between the Druze and LAF, intensified during the month of August. Intense Druze PLA artillery shelling forced the Beirut International Airport to close between 10 and 16 August, and the Druze PSP/PLA leadership made explicit their opposition to the deployment of LAF units in the Chouf. The U.S. Marines compound came under further Druze PLA shell-fire on 28 August, this time killing two Marines, which led the Marines to retaliate with their own artillery, shelling the Druze positions in the Chouf with 155mm high-explosive rounds. This incident marked the beginning of the shooting war for the U.S. military forces in Lebanon. Although President Gemayel accused Syria of being behind the Druze shelling and threatened to respond accordingly, artillery duels between the LAF and Druze militias continued sporadically until a ceasefire came in effect on late August.

==== Civil administration of the mountain ====
The Civil Administration of the Mountain, sometimes referred to as Jabal al-Druze, named after the Druze region in Syria, was a Druze-dominated geopolitical region that existed in the Chouf from 1983 until its gradual erosion following the Taif Agreement and the end of the country's civil war. It was one of the wartime state-like territories (known as cantons) which was controlled by the People's Liberation Army (PLA). The PLA controlled most of the Chouf District and some parts of Aley and Baabda. It bordered the East Beirut canton to the north, which was controlled by a rival Christian militia, the Lebanese Forces.

==== Mountain War ====
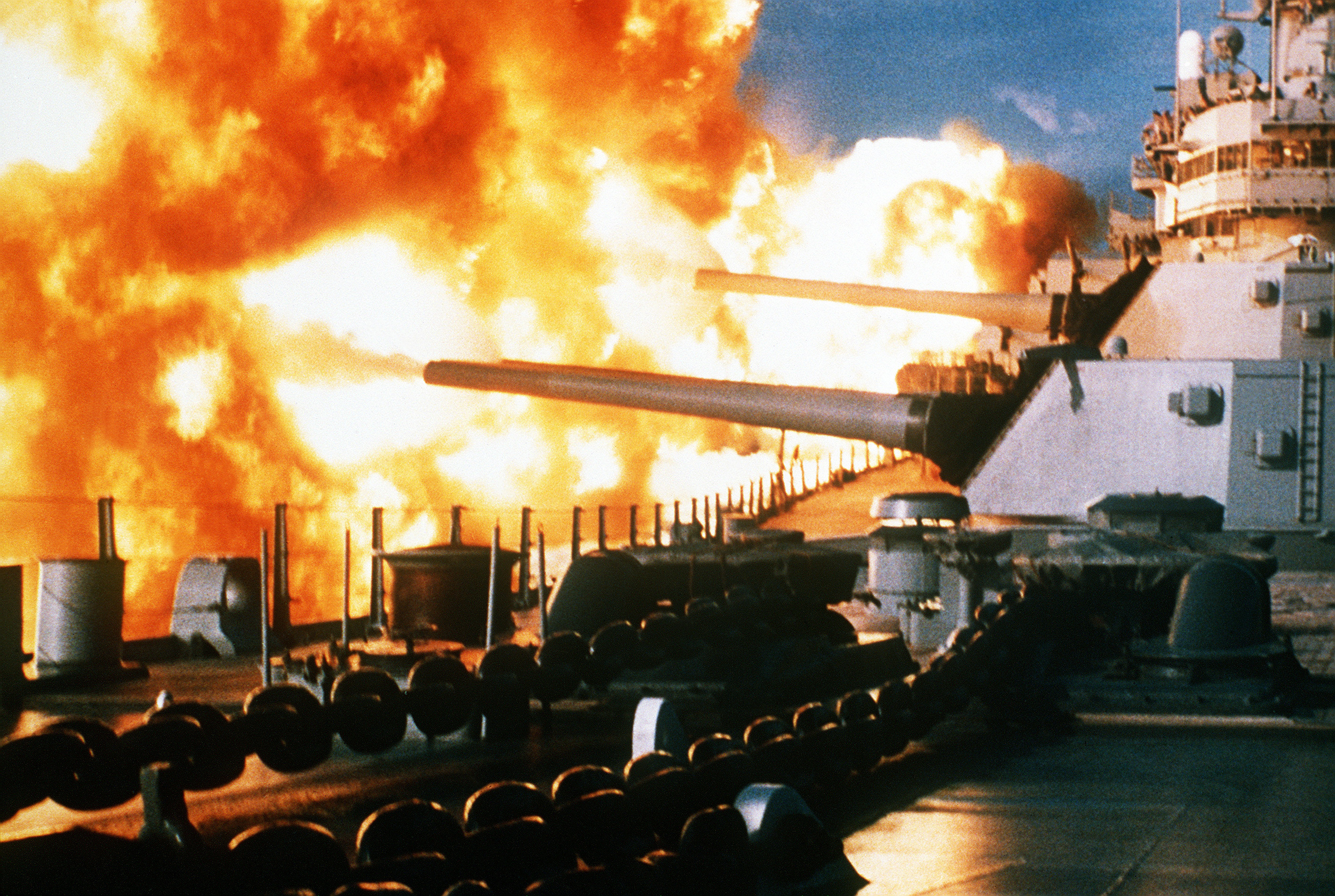
USS New Jersey fires a salvo against anti-government militia forces in the Chouf, 9 January 1984.

No longer able to sustain the casualties that the IDF was taking in policing the Chouf District, and increasingly despairing of President Gemayel's ability to work out an understanding with his mounting Druze and Muslim Shia opposition, the Israelis decided on 31 August to withdraw unilaterally from the region and the area around Beirut to new positions further south along the Awali River, ostensibly to allow the Lebanese Army to resume control over the area. This unexpected move effectively removed the buffer made by the IDF between the Druze and Christian militias, which now maneuvered toward an inevitable confrontation. Some international analysts have argued that the Israelis had deliberately provoked the conflict so that their Christian LF allies could establish themselves in the area. New recordings of a phone call between the U.S. President Ronald Reagan and the Israeli prime minister Menachem Begin released by the New York Post in November 2014 revealed a request made by Reagan to the Israeli Prime-minister to delay the withdrawal of Israeli troops from the Chouf mountains. In any event, the cease-fire in the Chouf barely held for a week, and triggered another round of brutal fighting which caused Walid Jumblatt to declare on 1 September that the Druze community of Lebanon was now formally at war with the Christian-dominated Gemayel government in east Beirut. The "Mountain War" had begun.

The Lebanese Forces militia had about 2,500 lightly equipped Christian militiamen in the Chouf, mostly tied up in static garrison duties throughout the region's main towns whereas another 2,000 fighters were deployed alongside LAF ground units at west Beirut. The Lebanese Army committed nine newly formed mechanized infantry brigades – the Third Brigade, Fourth Brigade, Fifth Brigade, Sixth Brigade, Seventh Brigade, Eighth Brigade, Ninth Brigade, Tenth Brigade and the Eleventh Brigade – totaling roughly some 30,000 men, placed under the overall command of Lt. Gen. Tannous and the Lebanese Armed Forces Chief-of-Staff, the Druze General Nadim al-Hakim. Deployed in the western Chouf, and at both the western and eastern sectors of Beirut, the army brigades benefited from aerial, artillery, and logistical support lent by U.S. and French forces of the MNF contingent. In this post-Israeli period in the Chouf, the Lebanese Forces and the regular army occasionally fought side-by-side, but at other times were opponents. This lack of coordination between the LF and the government was due to the deep distrust that LF senior commanders felt towards President Amine Gemayel, its moderate political posture and relations with Lebanese Muslim and Palestinian leaders. As soon as the last Israeli units left the Chouf, the Druze launched on 5 September a full-scale offensive on Lebanese Forces' and Lebanese Army positions at Deir el-Qamar, Kabr Chmoun and Bhamdoun. A garrison of just 250 Lebanese Forces' fighters commanded by Paul Andari, the LF Deputy Field Commander of the Mountain District, were defending Bhamdoun, with orders to hold their positions for 12 hours until being replaced by Lebanese Army units. However, 72 hours later the expected reinforcements failed to arrive, and it became clear that the LF counter-offensive in the coastal town of Kfarmatta aimed at opening the road to Bhamdoun had stalled. Warned at the last minute by the PLO of the eminent Druze offensive, Samir Geagea, the LF supreme commander in the Mountain region, issued a general evacuation order of all Christian civilians from the towns and villages of the Aley and Chouf districts towards the symbolic town of Deir el-Qamar, site of the Christian population massacres in 1860.

Bhamdoun fell on the 7th, followed two days later by Kabr Chmoun, forcing the Lebanese Forces troops' to fall back to Deir el-Qamar, which held 10,000 Christian residents and refugees and was defended by 1,000 LF militiamen; the two LF armored companies managed to hold their ground at Souk El Gharb and Shahhar, and later spearheaded LF counterattacks at nearby Druze-held towns. The Lebanese Forces Command in east Beirut later accused the Druze PSP of both ransacking Bhamdoun and of committing "unprecedented massacres" in the Chouf; to deny support, cover or a visible community for the LF to protect, the Druze implemented a 'territorial cleansing' policy to drain the Christian population from the region. It is estimated that between 31 August and 13 September, Jumblatt's PLA militia forces overran thirty-two villages killing 1,500 people and drove another 50,000 out of their homes in the mountainous areas east and west of Beirut. In retaliation, some 127 Druze civilians were killed by LF militiamen between 5–7 September at the Shahhar region, Kfarmatta, Al-Bennay, Ain Ksour, and Abey, where the LF also desecrated the tomb of a prominent Druze religious man. It is estimated that these 'tit-for-tat' killings ultimately led to the displacement of 20,000 Druze and 163,670 Christian villagers from the Chouf. The 25 September cease-fire temporarily stabilized the situation. The Gemayel government maintained its jurisdiction over west Beirut districts, the Shia Amal movement had not yet fully committed itself in the fighting, and Jumblatt's PSP/PLA remained landlocked in the Chouf Mountains. The Lebanese government and opposition personalities agreed to meet in Geneva, Switzerland, for a national reconciliation conference under the auspices of Saudi Arabia and Syria, and chaired by President Gemayel to discuss political reform and the May 17 Agreement.

For its part, the United States found itself carrying on Israel's role of shoring up the precarious Lebanese government. An emergency arms shipment had been dispatched earlier on 14 September to beleaguered LAF units fighting in the Chouf, which were backed by air strikes and naval gunfire from the battleship USS New Jersey. On 29 September, the U.S. Ambassador's residence in east Beirut was hit by shell-fire and in response, the U.S. Marines' contingent stationed at Beirut International Airport was ordered to use their M198 155mm howitzers in support of the Lebanese Army. That same day, the United States Congress, by a solid majority, adopted a resolution declaring the 1973 War Powers Resolution to apply to the situation in Lebanon and sanctioned the U.S. military presence for an eighteen-month period. U.S. vice-president George H. W. Bush made clear the position of the Reagan administration by demanding that Syria "get out from the Lebanon". A large naval task-force of more than a dozen vessels was assembled off the Lebanese coast and an additional contingent of 2,000 U.S. Marines was sent to the country. The United States Department of Defense (DoD) stated that the increase of its military forces in the eastern Mediterranean had been carried out to "send a message to Syria".

Alarmed by this American posture (which compromised the neutrality of the Multinational Force) and fearing for the safety of their own MNF contingents in Lebanon, the British, French and Italian governments expressed their concerns, insisting with the Reagan administration to restrict its activities in the region to the protection of Lebanese civilians and to stop supporting what they considered an ongoing assault of the Gemayel government on his own people. However, President Reagan refused to modify his intransigent position and on 1 October, another shipment of arms was delivered to the Lebanese Army, which included M48A5 main battle tanks (MBTs), additional M113 armored personnel carriers (APCs) and M198 155mm long-range howitzers. That same day, Walid Jumblatt announced the formation of a separate governmental administration for the Chouf, the "Civilian Administration of the Mountain" (CAM or CAOM), and called for the mass defection of all Druze elements from the Lebanese Armed Forces. A few days later, the Druze LAF Chief-of-Staff and commander of the Seventh Brigade, General Nadim al-Hakim, returned to the Saïd el-Khateeb Barracks at Hammana along with the 800 Officers, NCOs and enlisted men who had deserted previously from the predominately Druze Eleventh Brigade, and announced his decision to remain in the Chouf, while his troops took sides with the Druze PSP/PLA.

The delivery of arms shipments was complemented by naval artillery barrages. Steaming to within two miles of the Lebanese coast, the battleship USS New Jersey, the destroyer USS John Rodgers and the nuclear-powered cruiser USS Virginia fired from their 5-inch naval guns some six-hundred 70 lb shells into the wooded hills above Beirut. Unfortunately, the U.S. Navy eschewed proper reconnaissance and without sending Forward air controllers to help spot accurately Druze PLA and Syrian Army positions, most of the shells missed their targets and fell in Shia- and Druze-populated sub-urban areas located on the edge of west Beirut and the western Chouf, causing hundreds of civilian casualties. For many Lebanese Muslims, this was the last straw – any illusion of U.S. neutrality had been dispelled by these recent developments and the MNF soon found itself exposed to hostile fire.

===== U.s military intervension =====
As a demonstration of American resolve, however, the hurriedly-executed raid was a fiasco – once over their targets in the Chouf, the U.S. fighter-bombers dispersed and pounded Syrian Army and Druze PLA positions but ran into a heavy barrage of anti-aircraft fire, so intense that the smoke in the sky rivalled that from the bomb blasts below. According to the U.S. Defense Department, the barrage included a volley of about 40 surface-to-air missiles and Flak fire from 150 anti-aircraft guns of various calibers, which filled the air with flame and smoke during the entire attack. The U.S. Navy aircraft were opposed by an intimidating array of Soviet-supplied AAA systems comprising ZPU-1, ZPU-2 and ZPU-4 14.5mm and ZU-23-2 23mm autocannons mounted on technicals and Gun trucks, M1939 (61-K) 37mm and AZP S-60 57mm anti-aircraft guns in fixed positions, and plenty of highly mobile, radar‑directed ZSU-23-4M1 Shilka SPAAGs surrounding Beirut, plus man-portable SA-7 Grail and vehicle-mounted SA-9 Gaskin surface-to-air missiles.

Two American planes, one A-6E and an A-7E, were shot down by Syrian SA-7 Grail or SA-9 Gaskin missiles. The Pilot of the A-6E, Lieutenant Mark A. Lange, ejected himself too late and was killed when his parachute failed to open properly while his Bombardier/Navigator, Lt. Bobby Goodman managed to bail out successfully and was taken prisoner by Syrian troops and Lebanese civilians when he touched the ground; their crippled plane crashed near the town of Kafr Silwan, located in the mountains of the Syrian-controlled portion of the Matn District. More fortunate was the Pilot of the A-7E, Commander Edward T. Andrews, the leader of Carrier Air Wing One (CVW-1) who was searching for the downed Intruder crew: although he suffered minor injuries, was able to eject and landed in the Mediterranean, where he was rescued by a Christian fisherman and his son who in turn handed him over to the U.S Marines. In flames, his stricken A-7E wavered for a moment in the air, and then exploded over the village of Zouk Mikael in the Keserwan District, 12 miles (19.31 km) northeast of Beirut International Airport, killing one Lebanese woman and injuring her three children when the debris crashed into their house; a third plane, also an A-7E, suffered tailpipe damage, apparently from an SA-7 or SA-9.

The bomb damage inflicted was difficult to assess. Although the U.S. Navy planes dropped some 24,000 lbs of ordnance – including 12 CBU‑59 Cluster Bombs and 28 MK-20 Rockeye "smart" bombs out of a total of 150 – and the complete target set had been engaged by the air strikes, the Syrians claimed that only an ammunition dump and an armored car were destroyed, and two people were killed and eight were wounded. While the results had officially been described as 'effective', professionally, the event was viewed as nothing short of a failure. There were no further American air strikes; instead, only artillery barrages from U.S. Navy warships and from U.S. Marines positions in the Beirut International Airport would be sanctioned against Syrian and Druze gun emplacements in the Chouf.

=== Post-civil war ===
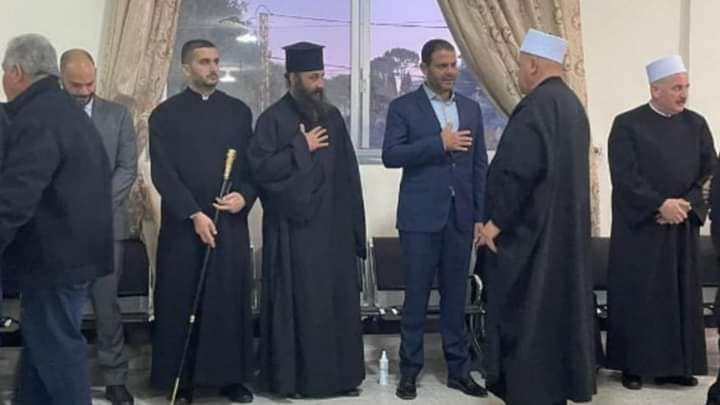
A meeting with Christian and Druze clergy in a town in the Chouf

In 2000, Christian-Maronite Patriarch Nassrallah Boutros Sfeir campaigned in Mount Lebanon for the reconciliation of Christians and Druze, after a dispute that goes back to the civil war, which is believed to have inspired the 7 August 2001 revolt.

=== 2008 violence ===
In May 2008, the tensions between the pro-government and opposition parties escalated when the cabinet announced a series of security decisions. Tensions began with revelations on Friday 2 May made by Progressive Socialist Party leader Walid Jumblatt, a key politician in the ruling March 14 alliance. He announced that a remote-controlled camera had been set up in a container park overlooking Beirut international airport's runway 17, which was frequently being used by 14 March politicians. In 14 March circles, fear was that the monitoring could be used for a possible attack on its leaders, as Lebanon had faced a series of political assassinations in recent times. Although Jumblatt did not accuse the party directly, he made clear that he thought 8 March's Hezbollah was behind the monitoring system's installment. Hezbollah dismissed the accusations, calling the allegation a product of Jumblatt's imagination and saying that those who leveled them were scaremongering and simply parroting a US campaign against it and other groups which are resisting Israel. In addition to the monitoring system, Jumblatt stated that Hezbollah had laid down a fiber optic telecommunication network connecting its powerbase in Dahiya in South Beirut with cities and towns in South and East Lebanon in predominantly Shiite areas. Although this was known to the government, it was now claimed that the network was being extended to the predominantly Christian and Druze areas of Mount Lebanon.

In its response to these allegations, the Lebanese cabinet announced that it regarded the telecommunication network and the monitoring system as a breach of law, undermining the state's sovereignty and the security of its citizens. Therefore, it declared that the matter would be referred not only to the Lebanese judicial system, but also to the Arab League and the United Nations. These moves severely antagonized Hezbollah, bringing tensions between the 8 March and 14 March coalitions to a boiling point and clashes erupted throughout the country and was at one point highly concentrated in the Chouf region.

On 9 May, heavy fighting broke out in Mount Lebanon between pro-government Progressive Socialist Party fighters and Hezbollah. The clashes started in Aytat, near Kaifun and soon expanded to cover many spots in Mount Lebanon including the cities of Baisour, Choueifat and Aley. Most of the fighting was concentrated on Hill 888. Fighting started when four Druze members of the Aley municipal police were kidnapped by Hezbollah. Soon after the news of the kidnapping spread, the mayor of Aley assembled a group of PSP fighters and went up to Hill 888. As they reached the hill they were attacked by Hezbollah gunmen who wounded a few of the PSP and municipality members. PSP members retaliated by killing 3 of the kidnappers. The incident developed into a significant armed clash. Artillery and mortars were used for the first time during these battles. A ceasefire agreement was supposed to take place at 18:00 of the same day, but fighters from both sides continued to exchange fire. Negotiations were ongoing for the PSP members to give up the fight and surrender their positions to the Lebanese Army, but it never happened.

The battles at Aley stopped for several hours, but the two sides clashed again in Mount Barouk to the southeast shortly before midnight. Barook separates the Druze heartland of Shouf from the mainly Shi'ite southern end of the Bekaa Valley. That night Hezbollah's fighters deployed from southern Beirut to the Qmatiye area tried to attack the hills near Aley but they were beaten back. After that Hezbollah tried to go on the offensive again and attacked their rival's positions. The Druze fighters had fought the Hezbollah militants from dug-in positions left over from the 1975–90 Civil War. The Druze used hunting guns, AK 47s and other machine guns, RPGs and allegedly even 23mm Anti-Aircraft Guns to blast at the advancing Hezbollah fighters. Opposition forces bombarded the pro-government Druze area with artillery while ground forces attacked Druze positions using rockets and machine guns. By morning, the Druze fighters agreed to cease hostilities and several villages loyal to Lebanon's pro-government Druze leader Walid Jumblatt had been handed over to the army. The kidnapped municipality police members were released by Hezbollah on 12 May in exchange of at least 30 Hezbollah members that were kidnapped by PSP in Mount Barook. Hezbollah were defeated.

=== 2019–current crisis ===
In October 2019 a series of country-wide protests began in response to many of the government's failures and malfeasances. In the months leading up to the protests there was an ever deepening foreign reserves liquidity crisis. Days before protests broke out, a series of about 100 major wildfires in Chouf, Khroub and other Lebanese areas displaced hundreds of people and caused enormous damage to Lebanese wildlife. The Lebanese government failed to deploy its firefighting equipment due to lack of maintenance and misappropriation of funds. Lebanon had to rely on aid from neighboring Cyprus, Jordan, Turkey and Greece. In November 2019, commercial banks responded to the liquidity crises by imposing illegal capital controls to protect themselves, despite there being no official law by the BDL regarding banking controls.

The protests created a political crisis in Lebanon, with Prime Minister Saad Hariri tendering his resignation and echoing protesters' demands for a government of independent specialists. A cabinet headed by Hassan Diab was formed in 2020.

== See also ==
- Christianity and Druze
