= Chouf massacres (1977) =

Series of attacks on Christian communities in Lebanon

- Part of the Lebanese Civil War
- Location: Chouf District, Lebanon
- Date: March 16 – March 30, 1977
- Target: Lebanese Maronite Christians
- Deaths: 177-250
- Perpetrator: People's Liberation Army
- Motive: Revenge; after the assassination of Kamal Jumblatt

Mainly between March 16, 1977 and March 30, 1977 (with other attacks occurring in mid-August) a series of massacres on Christian civilians took place in the Chouf District during the Lebanese Civil War. The massacres were mostly committed by Druze gunmen of the People's Liberation Army after the assassination of Druze leader Kamal Jumblatt. Many victims were mutilated and women were reportedly sexually abused.

== Background ==
Long-standing enemies since the 1860s, the Druze have always been at odds with the Maronites, and acts of barbarism on both sides have bedevilled their ability to co-exist for centuries past. On 16 March 1977, the PSP leader Kamal Jumblatt was ambushed and killed in his car near Baakline, by unidentified gunmen (allegedly, fighters from the pro-Syrian faction of the SSNP-L, acting in collusion with the Syrian military commander of the Mount Lebanon region, Colonel Ibrahim Huweija); believing that the perpetrators were members of the predominately Christian Kataeb Regulatory Forces or Tigers Militia, People's Liberation Army militiamen extracted swift retribution on the local Maronite population living in the intermixed towns and villages around Baakline. Despite the hasty dispatch on 17 March of 4,000 Syrian Arab Army troops from the Arab Deterrent Force (ADF) to keep the peace in the Chouf District, it is estimated that about 177–250 Maronite villagers were killed in reprisal actions at the towns of Moukhtara and Barouk, and at the villages of Mazraat el-Chouf, Maaser el-Chouf, Botmeh, Kfar Nabrakh, Machghara and Brih (St George's Church attack).

== Attacks ==
=== Mazraat el-Chouf ===
On March 17, Druze militiamen committed killing sprees in Mazraat el-Chouf killing 52 people in the village.

=== Maaser el-Chouf ===
In Maaser el-Chouf, 9 people were killed during a funeral and 3 others who were fleeing along with 9 people from a neighboring village called Machghara. As a result 25,000 Christians fled the area, mostly moving to East Beirut.

=== Brih ===
On August 21, Druze leftist gunmen attacked St George's Church during prayers on Sunday with automatic gunfire inside and around the church killing 13 people. The Christian population fled the village. However, current construction projects have taken place to repair abandoned Christian houses with the aim of repopulating the Christian households of Brih.

=== Other attacks ===
Other killings took place in Barouk (28 killed), Botmeh (9 killed), Kfarnabrakh (6 killed), Fraydis (6 killed), as well as in Baadaran, Shurit, and Ain-Zhalta. Many victims were reported to have been mutilated and women sexually abused.

== Aftermath ==
Between 1975 and 1977, after numerous successive attacks terrorizing the population, around 260,000 Christians (60% of the Christian population in the Chouf District) fled their villages, mostly moving to East Beirut.

== See also ==
- List of massacres in Lebanon
- List of attacks in Lebanon
- List of assassinations in Lebanon
- Terrorism in Lebanon
