= Batloun =

- Old Batloun's Bridge

- Location within Lebanon
- Coordinates: 33°41′N 35°39′E
- Country: Lebanon
- Governorate: Mount Lebanon

Government
  - Mayor (since 2016): Marwan Kaiss

Area
  - Total: 5.5 km^{2} (2.1 sq mi)
- Elevation: 1,250 m (4,100 ft)

Population
  - Total: 4,500
- Time zone: +2
  - Summer (DST): +3

Batloun (Levantine Arabic: بتلون, romanized: Batlūn) is a village in the Chouf District in Mount Lebanon Governorate, Lebanon. Batloun is located 48 kilometers (30 miles) away from Beirut, the capital of Lebanon. It sits at an altitude of 1250 meters (4101 feet) above sea level and has an overall surface area of 5.5 square kilometers or about 550 hectares (2.1 square miles).

== Geography ==
Batloun is bordered by Kfar Nabrakh to the west, Jisr el Misri and Barouk to the east, Mazraat El-Chouf to the south and Brih to the north.

== Population ==
Between 4200 to 4500 people live in Batloun, of which 80% are permanent residents. Thousands of former residents of Batloun are a part of the Lebanese diaspora around the world.

== Government ==
Batloun has a council with 12 members and a mayor. The council is divided into different committees, managing Work, Education, Culture and Delivery.

Walid Farhan Serhal is mayor of Batloun since May 2025.

== Education ==
There is one public school, the Batloun Public Intermediate School.

== Infrastructure ==
Telephone connections and a sewage disposal system are well established, but the water connections suffer from regular shortages and electricity is being restricted to a certain number of hours per week.

In recent years, under Mayor Marwan Kaiss, Batloun is increasing its use of renewable energy, including solar energy, and aims to become a “green village“ by 2030.

== Economy ==
Batloun has attained regional significance through the agricultural production of silkworms, apples, peaches, cherries, figs, almonds and grapes, that are sold at the market in Sidon.

Other major sources of income are governmental jobs, aluminum manufacturing and metal welding.
