= St George's Church attack =

1977 attack in Lebanon

- Part of the Chouf massacres
- Location: Brih, Chouf District
- Date: August 21, 1977
- Target: Lebanese Maronite Christians
- Attack type: Mass shooting
- Weapon: Automatic rifles
- Deaths: 13
- Perpetrator: People's Liberation Army
- Motive: Revenge; after the assassination of Kamal Jumblatt

The St George's Church attack, also known as the massacre of the Saint George Church, was a massacre of Maronite Christians in the Lebanese village of Brih in the Chouf District which took place on August 21, 1977, during the Lebanese Civil War.

Druze leftist gunmen attacked St George's Church during prayers on Sunday with automatic gunfire inside and around the church killing 13 people.

== Motives ==
The attack was part of a series of massacres of Christians in the Chouf District which was in response following the March 16 assassination of Kamal Jumblatt, founder of the Progressive Socialist Party and traditional leader of the Druze community, by unidentified gunmen (allegedly, fighters from the pro-Syrian faction of the SSNP-L, acting in collusion with the Syrian military commander of the Mount Lebanon region, Colonel Ibrahim Huweija).

== Aftermath ==
Brih's Christian population fled the village. However, current construction projects have taken place to repair abandoned Christian houses with the aim of repopulating the Christian households of Brih.

== See also ==
- Lebanese Civil War
- List of massacres in Lebanon
- Chouf massacres (1977)
- History of the Chouf region
- Progressive Socialist Party
- People's Liberation Army (Lebanon)
- Mountain War (Lebanon)
- List of extrajudicial killings and political violence in Lebanon
