= Garabet Artin Davoudian =

Ottoman governor of Mount Lebanon from 1861 to 1868

Garabet Davoudian
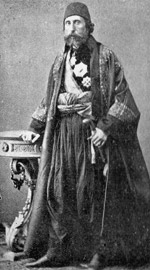
- Garabet Davoudian in Ottoman governor's regalia
- Born: c. 1816; Istanbul, Ottoman Empire
- Died: 1873

Garabet Artin Pasha Davoudian (also Garabed Artin Davoudian, Davud Pasha, Dawud Pasha; Arabic: قره ‌بت آرتين باشا داوديان) was an Ottoman career diplomat and the first mutasarrif of Mount Lebanon from 1861 to 1868, following the establishment of the Règlement Organique.

== Early life ==
Dawud Pasha was born around 1816 to an aristocratic Armenian Catholic family in Istanbul. He received his education in French and Ottoman schools.

== Career ==
Dawud Pasha was the first to hold the office of mutasarrif (governor) of the newly created, semi-autonomous Ottoman administrative sub-division of Mount Lebanon Mutasarrifate in the aftermath of the 1860 civil conflict in Mount Lebanon and Damascus.

Before his tenure as governor, he served as a diplomatic attaché in Berlin and Vienna. He was raised to the rank of vizier and appointed as mutasarrif in 1861. The appointment was supposed to last for 3 years, but it was prolonged for another 5 years.

The appointment of a foreign mutasarrif caused widespread resentment in Mount Lebanon, particularly among Maronite feudal lords who contested their loss of power and influence. Despite being Christian, Dawud Pasha did not embody the wishes of the local Christian parties, but rather embodied imperial Ottoman reform, especially the Tanzimat. One of his major antagonists was Youssef Bey Karam, a local Maronite strongman who mounted a rebellion against the Ottomans from 1866 to 1867.

Dawud Pasha spoke several languages, including French, German, and Turkish, but did not speak Arabic, the common language of Mount Lebanon. Despite the animosity of the local population, Dawud Pasha was credited with implementing a fair rule.

== Resignation and exile ==
The Ottoman foreign ministry was suspicious of Dawud Pasha's direct dealings with the European merchants and diplomatic delegations in Beirut; prerogative traditionally linked to his superior, the provincial governor. In 1868, Dawud Pasha pressured the Sublime Porte for more power by tendering his resignation, which was accepted. He was received back in Istanbul where he was appointed Minister of Public Works. He was later accused of corruption and exiled to France.
