= Règlement organique (Mount Lebanon) =

1860s European-Ottoman treaties

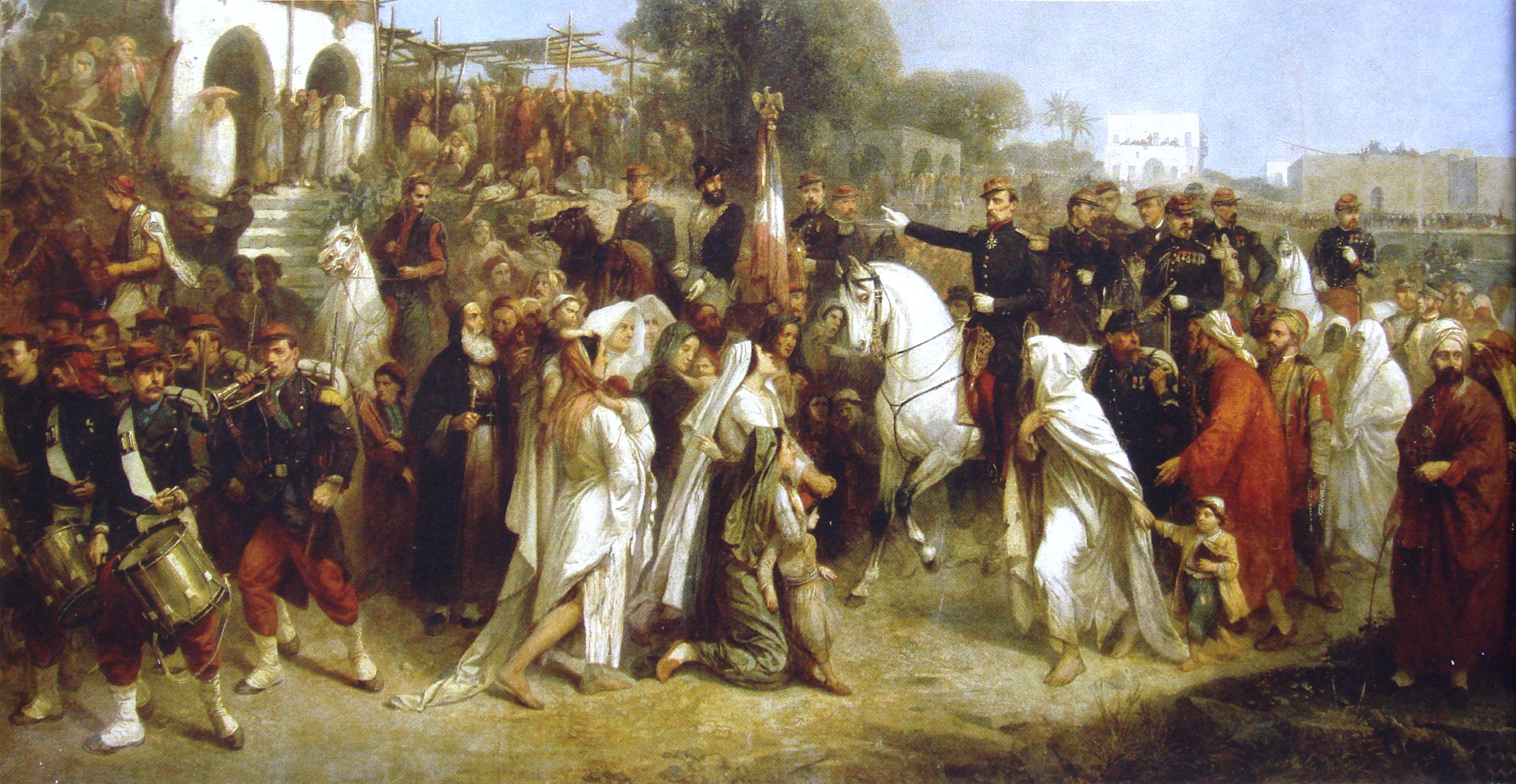
Painting by Jean-Adolphe Beaucé of French Expeditionary Corps landing in Beyrouth, 16 August 1860

The Règlement organique (from French: "Organic Regulation") was a series of international conventions between the Ottoman Empire and the European Powers from 1860 to 1864 which led to the creation of the Mount Lebanon Mutasarrifate.

The 1860 Lebanon conflict led France to intervene and stop the massacre of Christian civilians after Ottoman troops had been aiding Islamic forces by either direct support or by disarming Christian forces. France, led by Napoleon III, recalled its ancient role as protector of Christians in the Ottoman Empire which was established in a treaty in 1523. Following the massacre and an international outcry, the Ottoman Empire agreed on 3 August 1860 to the dispatch of up to 12,000 European soldiers to reestablish order. The region of Syria was then part of the Ottoman Empire. The agreement was further formalized in a convention on 5 September 1860 with Austria, Great Britain, France, Prussia and Russia. France was to supply half of that number, and other countries were to send supplementary forces as needed. The agreement was signed in Paris on 5 September 1860.

An important consequence of the French expedition was the establishment of the autonomy of the Mount Lebanon Mutasarrifate from Syria, with the nomination by the Sultan of an Armenian Christian Governor from Constantinople named Daud Pasha on 9 June 1861. On the same day, through a further agreement, termed the Beyoglu Protocol, signed between the Ottoman Empire and the European Powers in Beyoğlu, Istanbul, gave that agreement international recognition. The protocol was introduced initially for a period of three years.

In September 1864, a further convention was signed, which confirmed the permanent character of the statute and made minor changes to it. An additional Maronite district was formed and the council under the governor was reorganised (it now had twelve members-four Maronites, three Druzes, three Greek Orthodoxes and Greek Uniates, one Sunnite and one Shi’a). The Règlement Organique of Lebanon remained in that form up till 1914.

== 5 September 1860 Agreement ==
=== Articles ===
1. A body of European troops, which may be increased to twelve thousand men, will be headed to Syria to help restore peace.
2. His Majesty the Emperor of the French immediately agrees to provide half of the body of troops. If it becomes necessary to increase its workforce to the number stipulated in the previous article, the High Powers would agree without delay with the Porte, by the ordinary diplomatic channels, the designation of those of them who would have to be filled.
3. The commander of the expedition will, upon his arrival in communication with the Special Commissioner of the Porte, to combine all the steps required by the circumstances, and taking positions that will be necessary to take care of fulfill the purpose of this Act.
4. Their Majesties the Emperor of Austria, the Emperor of the French, the Queen of the United Kingdom of Great Britain and Ireland, His Royal Highness the Prince Regent of Prussia and His Majesty the Emperor of all the Russias promise maintain sufficient naval forces to contribute to the success of joint efforts to restore peace on the coast of Syria.
5. The High Contracting Parties, convinced that this time will be sufficient to achieve the goal of peace they have in view, set the duration to six months of the occupation of European troops in Syria.
6. The Sublime Porte undertakes to facilitate, as far as it will depend on the supply and livelihoods of the expeditionary corps.
7. The present Convention shall be ratified and the ratifications exchanged at Paris within five weeks or sooner if possible.

=== Signatories ===
- Édouard Thouvenel for the Second French Empire
- Richard von Metternich, ambassador of the Austrian Empire to France
- Henry Wellesley, 1st Earl Cowley, British Ambassador to France
- Heinrich VII, Prince Reuss of Köstritz, diplomat (Legationsrat) at the Prussian embassy to France
- Pavel Kiselyov, Russian ambassador to France

== 9 June 1861 Agreement ==
=== Announcement ===
The draft Règlement, dated May 1, 1861, having been, after amendments by mutual agreement, converted into a final settlement will be enacted in the form of a firman by His Imperial Majesty the Sultan, and officially communicated to the Representatives of Five Great Powers.
Article I has led to the following statement made by His Highness Aali Pasha, and accepted by the five Representatives: "The Christian Governor responsible for the administration of Lebanon will be chosen by the Porte, which will report directly. He will have the title of Mushir, and ordinarily reside in Deir el Qamar, which is placed under his direct authority. Invested with this authority for three years he will still be removable, but his dismissal may not be pronounced as a result of a judgment. Three months before the expiry of its mandate, the Porte is to prepare a new agreement with the representatives of the Great Powers."
It was also understood that the power conferred by the Porte to the officer, under its responsibility to appoint the Administrative Agent, would be given permanently, at which time it would have the authority, rather than for each appointment.
In relation to Article X, which relates to trials between subjects protected by a foreign power, on the one hand, and the inhabitants of the mountain on the other hand, it was agreed that a Joint Commission sitting in Beirut would verify and revise the "titres de protection".
To maintain the security and freedom of the road from Damascus to Beirut, the Sublime Porte will establish a blockhouse on the aforesaid road as it may deem most suitable.
The Governor of Lebanon may disarm the Mountain when the circumstances are favorable.

=== Signatories ===
- Mehmed Emin Âli Pasha on behalf of the Ottoman Empire
- Charles, marquis de La Valette, French Ambassador to the Ottoman Empire
- Anton von Prokesch-Osten, Austrian Ambassador to the Ottoman Empire
- Henry Bulwer, 1st Baron Dalling and Bulwer, British Ambassador to the Ottoman Empire
- Robert von der Goltz, Prussian Ambassador to the Ottoman Empire
- Aleksey Lobanov-Rostovsky, Russian Ambassador to the Ottoman Empire

== See also ==
- Capitulations of the Ottoman Empire
- National Pact
- Status Quo (Jerusalem and Bethlehem)
