= Kfar Nabrakh =

Kfar Nabrakh كفر نبرخ
- Location in Lebanon
- Coordinates: 33°41′54″N 35°38′2″E
- Country: Lebanon
- Governorate: Mount Lebanon
- District: Chouf

Area
  - Total: 941 ha (2,330 acres)
- Elevation: 1,010 m (3,310 ft)

Kfar Nabrakh (Arabic: كفر نبرخ, romanized: Kfar Nabrakh) is a municipality in the Chouf District of Mount Lebanon Governorate, Lebanon. It is located 50 kilometers southeast of Beirut. Kfarnabrakh total land area consists of 941 hectares. Its average elevation is 1,010 meters above sea level. Its inhabitants are religiously mixed, with a Druze majority and a Melkite Christian minority. During the Lebanese Civil War, 64 residents of the village were killed in the violence.
