= Mazraat el-Chouf =

Mazraat el-Chouf مزرعة الشوف
- Municipality
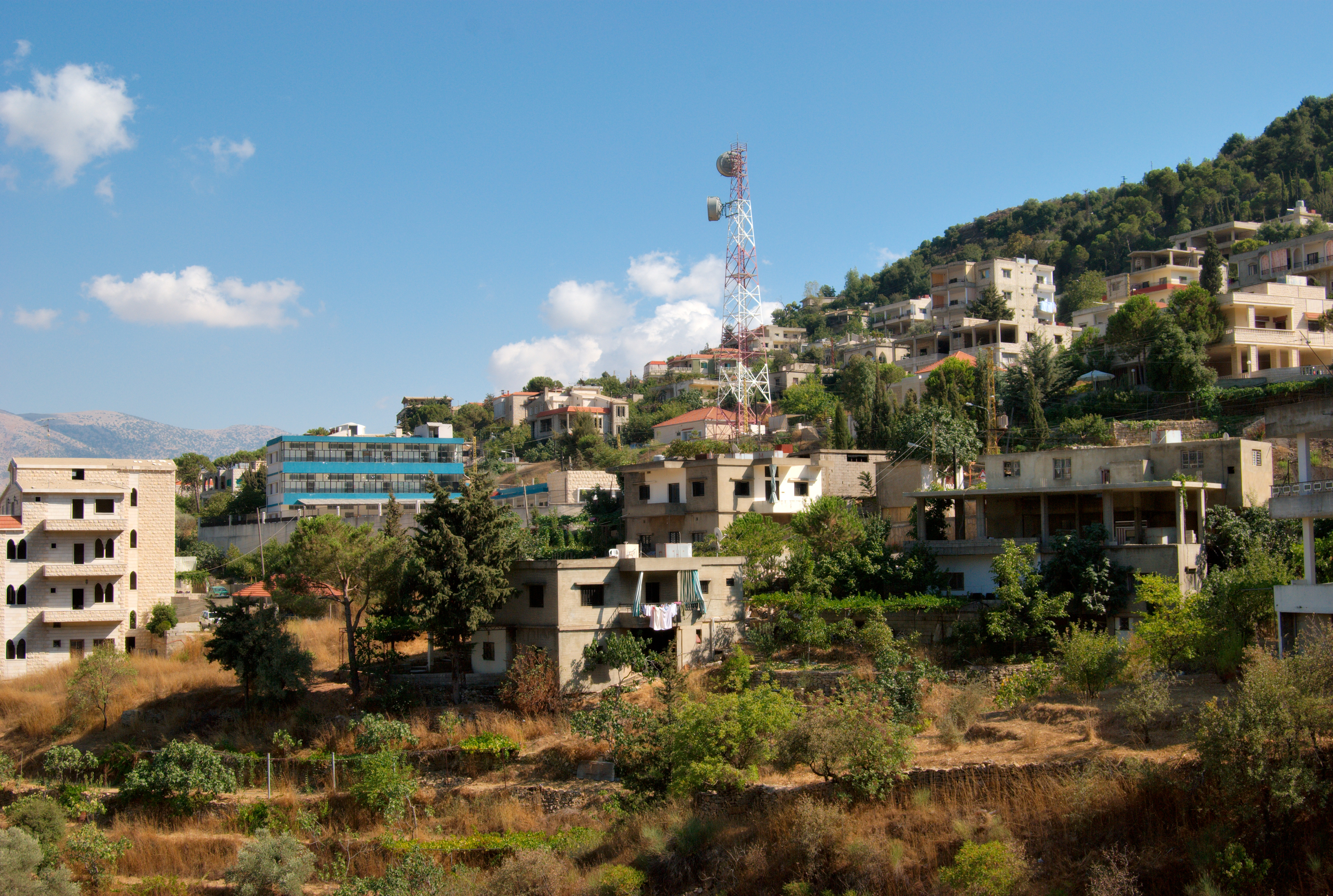
- Neighborhood in Mazraat el-Chouf, 2009

- Location in Lebanon
- Coordinates: 33°38′46″N 35°34′58″E
- Country: Lebanon
- Governorate: Mount Lebanon
- District: Chouf

Area
  - Total: 1.36 km^{2} (0.53 sq mi)
- Elevation: 950 m (3,120 ft)
- Time zone: UTC+2 (EET)
  - Summer (DST): UTC+3 (EEST)
- Dialing code: +961

Mazraat el-Chouf (Arabic: مزرعة الشوف, romanized: Mazraʿat ash-Shūf; also spelled Mazra'at al-Shuf) is a municipality in the Chouf District of the Mount Lebanon Governorate in Lebanon. It is located 50 kilometers southeast of Beirut. Its average elevation is 950 meters above sea level and its total land area is 1,359 hectares. Mazraat el-Chouf had 4,330 registered voters in 2010 and the inhabitants are predominantly Druze and Maronites.
