= Brih =

- Location within Lebanon
- Coordinates: 33°43′N 35°39′E
- Country: Lebanon
- Governorate: Mount Lebanon
- Time zone: +2
  - Summer (DST): +3

Brih or Breeh (Arabic: بريح, romanized: Brīḥ) is a village in the Chouf District in Mount Lebanon region, Lebanon. Brih is located 53 kilometres (33 mi) away from Beirut, the capital of Lebanon. It sits at an altitude of 800–1,100 metres (2,600–3,600 ft) above sea level and has an overall surface area of 305 hectares (1.18 mi^{2}).

The word Brih is of Syro-Aramaic origin it means "The House of the Perfume" where "Bet" which means house or place and "Rih" or "Reeha" means perfume.

== Access to Brih ==
There are three roads leading to Brih:

- Road from East of Lebanon: Beqaa – Maaser El Chouf – Moukhtara – Boqaata – Ain w Zain – Batloun – Kfar Nabrakh – Brih.
- Road from North of Lebanon : Beirut – Aley – Bhamdoun – Saoufar – Mdayrij – Ain Dara – Nabeh Safa – Brih.
- Road from South of Lebanon: Damour – Deir el Qamar – Maaser Beit Eddin – Fouwara – Brih.

== Population ==
Brih is a mixed Druze and Christian village.

== St George's Church attack ==
Druze leftist gunmen attacked St George's Church during prayers on August 21, 1977, with automatic gunfire inside and around the church killing 13 people.

== Religious places in Brih ==
- The Druze House, or the Village House.
- Saint Georges is a Maronite
- Saint Elias, another Maronite Church
