= Gemayel family =

Gemayel (/ʒəmaɪˈɛl/; Arabic: الجميّل; romanized: al-Jumayyil) is the name of a prominent Lebanese Maronite Christian family based in Bikfaya, Lebanon.

== History ==
The family is mentioned in bureaucratic records as among the inhabitants of Bikfaya as early as the 16th century. Between that time until the 18th century they were the sheikhs of the village. In 1642 Sheikh Abu Aoun was the joint governor of the subdistrict of Bsharri alongside the Druze chief Zayn al-Din of the Sawwaf family.

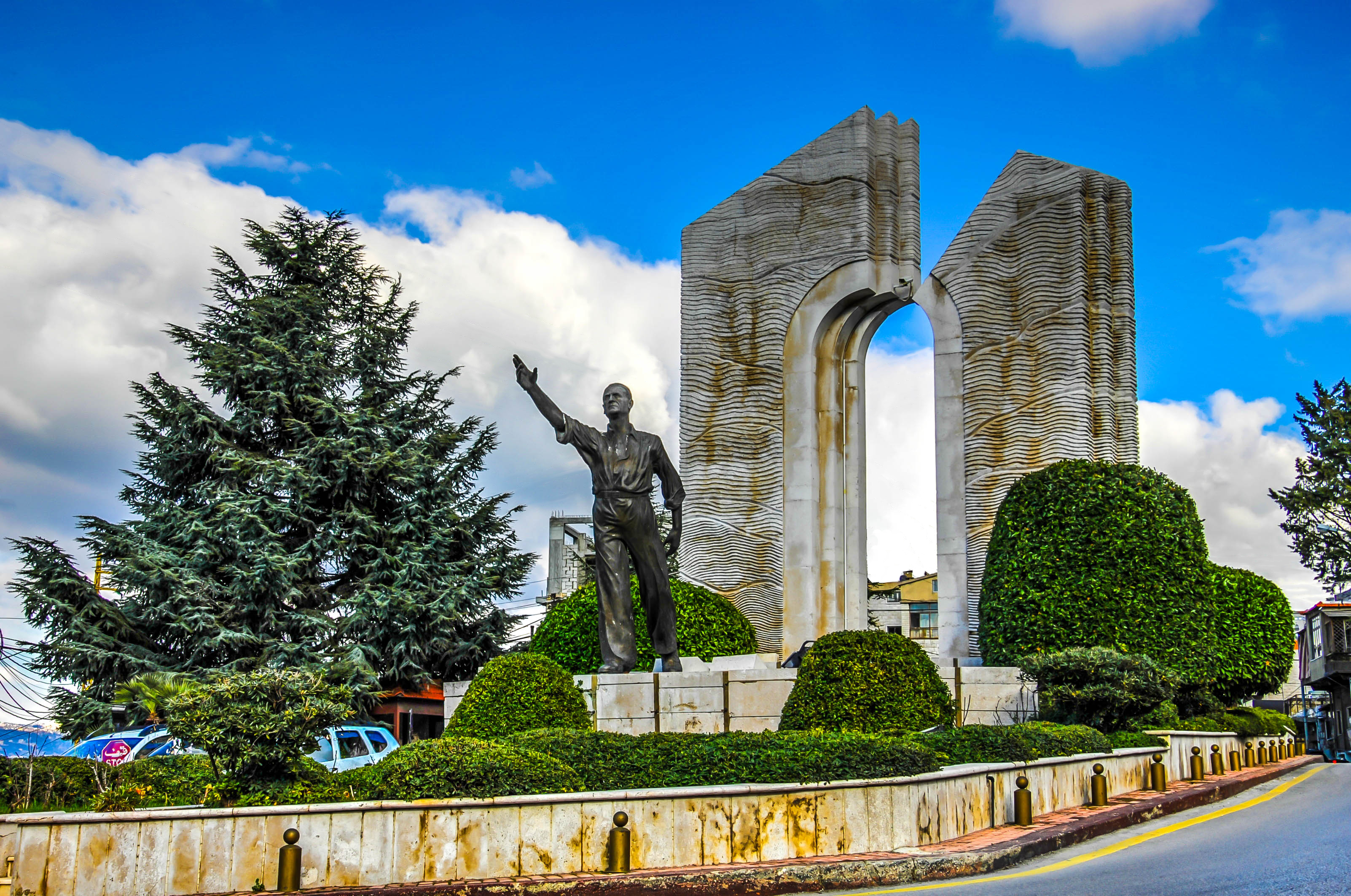
Pierre Gemayel Memorial, Bikfaya

== Notable members ==
- Philip Gemayel, Maronite patriarch from 1795 to 1796
- César Gemayel (1898-1958), Lebanese painter
- Pierre Gemayel (1905–1984), Lebanese political leader and founder of the Kataeb Party
- Geneviève Gemayel (1908–2003), Lebanese political figure, pilot and artist
- Maurice Gemayel (1910–1970), Member of Parliament, brother-in-law of Pierre Gemayel
- Amine Gemayel (born 1942), President of Lebanon from 1982 to 1988, son of Pierre Gemayel
- Bachir Gemayel (1947–1982), son of Pierre Gemayel and Lebanese military commander, politician and president-elect
- Joyce Gemayel, former First Lady of Lebanon, Amine Gemayel's wife
- Pierre Amine Gemayel (1972–2006), Lebanese politician, government minister, assassinated son of President Amine Gemayel
- Samy Gemayel (born 1980), Lebanese politician, son of Amine Gemayel and brother of Pierre Amine Gemayel
- Solange Gemayel (born 1949), former First Lady of Lebanon, widow of former President-elect Bachir Gemayel and was a Member of Parliament from 2005 to 2009
- Nadim Gemayel (born 1982), Lebanese politician, son of Bachir Gemayel
- Boutros Gemayel (1932-2021), Archbishop of Cipro, Cyprus

== See also ==
- List of political families in Lebanon
- Maronite politics

== Bibliography ==
- Hourani, Alexander (2010). New Documents on the History of Mount Lebanon and Arabistan in the 10th and 11th Centuries H. Beirut.
