= Mounir El Hajj =

- منير الحاج

Leader of the Kataeb Party
- In office March 21, 1999 – October 4, 2001
- Preceded by: Georges Saadeh
- Succeeded by: Karim Pakradouni

Personal details
- Born: 1936 (age 89–90) Baskinta, Lebanon
- Occupation: Politician, lawyer

Mounir El Hajj (Arabic: منير الحاج; born 1936) is a Lebanese politician and lawyer who headed the Kataeb Party from 1999 until 2001.

== Early life and education ==
Mounir El Hajj was raised by a Maronite family in the town of Baskinta. He completed his primary education in Baskinta and his secondary education in Gemayzeh. In 1960, she obtained a degree in French and Lebanese law from Saint Joseph University of Beirut.

== Politics ==
He joined the Kataeb Party in 1957 and served in the northern Matn district as secretary in 1958 and then the presidency in 1963. He presented himself in 1970 as a candidate for the party in the parliamentary by-elections in the Metn district after the death of Maurice Gemayel and obtained the support of the bases, but the Politburo preferred him to the president's son, Amin Gemayel, who eventually won the seat after defeating Fouad Lahoud. He entered the Political Bureau in 1972 and in 1987 he took over the General Secretariat.

In 1991, El Hajj was chosen as a replacement for one of the many vacant seats in the Lebanese parliament after the end of the Lebanese Civil War and the creation of the Taif agreement. He remained the deputy until the next general elections in 1992 in which the Kataeb Party boycotted.

=== Leader of the Kataeb Party ===
In 1998 he held the position of First Vice President under Georges Saadeh. He was elected as president on March 21, 1999, in front of Antoine Shader by 66 votes to 59 during the party's 22nd conference. Under his leadership, the party participated in the 2000 elections and won two seats which were won by Antoine Ghanem and Amine Gemayel compared to the zero in 1996, though El Hajj was unable to enter the parliament after his defeat the Metn constituency. He led a list called “Al-Tawafuq Al-Matni” that included Emile Emile Lahoud, Ghassan Al-Ashqar, Shaker Bou Suleiman, Michel Al-Murr, Antoine Haddad and Sebouh Hovenanian, but he was defeated by Pierre Amin Gemayel of the Phalangist opposition as the party was undivided. The party remained divided throughout El-Hajj's presidency, with the presence of opposition led by Elie Karameh and Amin Gemayel, which intensified after his electoral defeat. On October 4, 2001, Karim Pakradouni was elected as his successor.

== See also ==
- Kataeb Party
- Matn District
- 2000 Lebanese general election
