= First Lady of Lebanon =

Wife of the President of Lebanon

First Lady of Lebanon سيدة لبنان الأولى

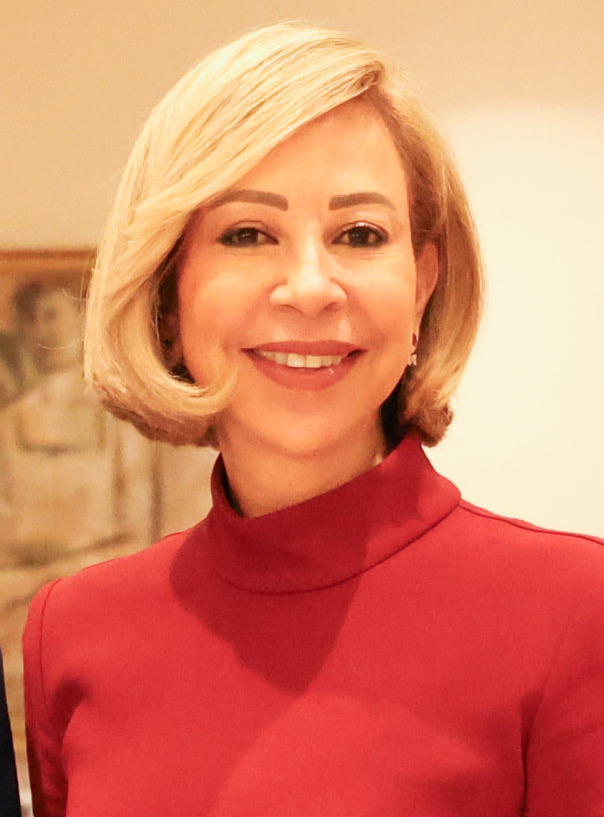
- Incumbent; Nehmat Aoun since 9 January 2025
- Residence: Baabda Palace
- Website: First Lady of the Republic of Lebanon

The First Lady of Lebanon is the title used for the wife of the President of Lebanon.

The First Lady of Lebanon is the director of the National Commission for Lebanese Women (NCLW), alongside the spouses of the Prime Minister and the Speaker of Parliament.

== List of first ladies of the Lebanese Republic (1943–present) ==
Name	Portrait	Term Began	Term Ended	President of Lebanon	Notes
Laudi Sursock (acting)		November 11, 1943	November 22, 1943	Émile Eddé (acting)	
Laure Shiha		November 22, 1943	September 18, 1952	Bechara El Khoury	First president and first lady following independence
Rose René Poitieux (acting)		September 18, 1952	September 22, 1952	Fouad Chehab (acting)	Chehab married Rose René Poitieux, the daughter of a French Army officer who was killed in World War I, at the Carmelite Church in Qbayyat Akkar on December 27, 1926. They had no children.
Zelpha Tabet		September 23, 1952	September 22, 1958	Camille Chamoun	Lebanon's second president and first lady. Zelpha Tabet married Chamoun in 1930. They had two sons, Dany Chamoun and Dory Chamoun, both of whom became politicians in the National Liberal Party (NLP). Former First Lady Zelpha Tabet died in 1971.
Rose René Poitieux		September 23, 1958	September 22, 1964	Fouad Chehab	French-born. Chehab married Rose René Poitieux, the daughter of a French Army officer who was killed in World War I, at the Carmelite Church in Qbayyat Akkar on December 27, 1926.
Nina Helou		September 23, 1964	September 22, 1970	Charles Helou	Born Nina Trad, Helou became the second woman to be admitted to the bar association of the French Mandate of Lebanon in January 1932. Nina Helou oversaw the completion of the Baabda Palace and the renovation of the Beiteddine Palace during her tenure as first lady.
Iris Handaly		September 23, 1970	September 22, 1976	Suleiman Frangieh	Iris Handaly, also spelled Iris Hendili, was born and raised in Egypt to Lebanese parents originally from the Lebanese village Douma.
Vacant		September 23, 1976	September 22, 1982	Élias Sarkis	President Sarkis was a bachelor who never married.
Solange Gemayel (First Lady-designate)		August 23, 1982	September 14, 1982	Bachir Gemayel	Born Solange Tutunji. Bachir Gemayel, who was elected President of Lebanon, was assassinated on September 14, 1982, days before he was expected to sworn into office. His widow, Solange Gemayel, was the First Lady-designate until his assassination. She was later elected to the Parliament of Lebanon, representing a Beirut constituency, from 2005 until her retirement from office in 2009 in favor of her son, Nadim.
Joyce Gemayel		September 23, 1982	September 22, 1988	Amine Gemayel	Amine Gemayel was elected President of Lebanon on September 21, 1982, following the assassination of his brother, President-elect Bachir Gemayel. As a result, Joyce Gemayel became first lady from 1982 until 1988. Born Joyce Tyan, she married Amine Gemayel in 1967. The Gamayels are considered one of Lebanon's most prominent Christian political families. Her children include Samy Gemayel and Pierre Amine Gemayel, who was assassinated in 2006.
Leila Pharaoun (acting) (disputed with Nadia El-Chami)		September 22, 1988	November 5, 1989	Selim Hoss (acting) (disputed with Michel Aoun)	Sometimes spelled Leila Pharaoun or Leyla Pharaon. Acting First Lady Leila Pharaoun was a Maronite Christian, while her husband, acting President Selim Hoss, was Sunni Muslim. She also served as the wife of the Prime Minister of Lebanon from 1976–1980, 1987–1990, and 1998–2000.
Nadia El-Chami (acting) (disputed with Leila Pharaoun)		September 22, 1988	October 13, 1990	Michel Aoun (acting) (disputed with Selim Hoss)	Michel Aoun and Selim Hoss disputed the offices of the President and Prime Minister.
Nayla Moawad		November 5, 1989	November 22, 1989	René Moawad	Nayla Moawad served as First Lady of Lebanon for just 17 days until her husband, President René Moawad, was assassinated on November 22, 1989, during the Lebanese Civil War. First elected to the Parliament of Lebanon in 1991, Moawad served as Minister of Social Affairs in the Cabinet of Prime Minister Fouad Siniora from July 19, 2005, until July 11, 2008.
Mona Jammal		November 24, 1989	November 24, 1998	Elias Hrawi	Mona Jammal was the second wife of President Elias Hrawi. Jammal was born in Baalbeck, Lebanon, but raised in Bethlehem and Jerusalem. Her father was Palestinian and her mother was Lebanese. Her father died when she was 9-years old. Following his death, her mother and sisters returned to Lebanon, while Jammal lived with her aunt in Amman, Jordan, where she completed high school before until she moved to Baalbeck at the age of 17. Mona Jammal married Elias Hrawi in 1961. They had two daughters, Zalfa and Roula.
Andrée Lahoud		November 24, 1998	November 24, 2007	Émile Lahoud	Born Andrée Amadouni, she married Émile Lahoud in 1967.
Vacant presidency
Wafaa Sleiman		May 25, 2008	May 24, 2014	Michel Suleiman	Wafaa Sleiman married Suleiman in 1973.
Vacant presidency
Nadia El-Chami		October 31, 2016	October 31, 2022	Michel Aoun	First Lady of Lebanon from 2016–2022. Chami married Michel Aoun on November 30, 1968. They have three daughters: Mireille, Claudine and Chantal.
Vacant presidency
Nehmat Aoun		January 9, 2025	Present	Joseph Aoun	
