= Elias Hankash =

Lebanese politician

Elias Rafik Hankash
- إلياس حنكش
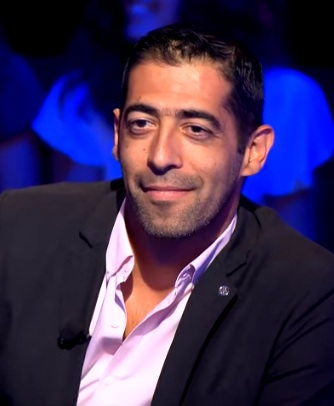
- Hankash in 2019

Member of the Lebanese Parliament
- Incumbent
- Assumed office 6 May 2018
- Constituency: Mount Lebanon II

Personal details
- Born: 1977 (age 48–49) Roumieh, Lebanon
- Party: Kataeb Party
- Other political affiliations: March 14 Alliance
- Spouse: Rita Lama
- Children: 3

Elias Hankash (Arabic: إلياس حنكش), born in 1977, is a Lebanese politician. He is currently a member of the Lebanese Parliament as a part of the Kataeb Party bloc.

== Early life and education ==
Elias Rakif Hankash was born in the town of Roumieh in 1977 in the Metn District to a Maronite family. He holds a bachelor's degree from the Holy Spirit University of Kaslik.

== Politics ==
He joined The Lebanese Phalange Party during his years of study, and rose through the ranks of the party over the years.

He acted as advisor to the Minister of Economy and Trade in 2014. Part of Hankash' political activity relates to his opposition to landfill sites on the Metn Coast as well as the high-voltage power transmission lines in the Mansourieh area.

In a joint list with the National Liberal Party and the Green Party in the Mount Lebanon II district, Hankash was able to secure a seat with 2,583 votes in the 2018 Lebanese general election. He was made the member of the Economy, Trade and Planning parliamentary commission, and the Youth and Sports parliamentary commission. The Kataeb Party won three seats. Following the 2020 Beirut explosion Hankash along with other MPs resigned.

Hankash was able to secure a seat in the Lebanese parliament after earning 6,148 votes during the 2022 general elections. 2 April 2022 Nadim Gemayel, a cousin of Samy, promoted his candidacy in a speech during a small event. Kataeb secured 4 seats for Salim Sayegh (3,477 votes), Nadim Gemayel (4,425 votes), Sami Gemayel (10,466 votes), and Elias Hankash (6,148 votes).

In 2024, he heavily criticized the leadership of Hezbollah, saying it is "Living in Delusion While Lebanon Burns". Hankash criticized Hezbollah for starting a war and blaming it on Lebanon. He also said Lebanese should welcome refugees but criticized the "infiltration" of Hezbollah's military into local populations which Hankash said endagers the civilians.

Hankash, in an interview said he would like to see the Lebanese army and the UN control the southern Lebanese border.

== Personal life ==
Hankash is married to Rita Lameh. They have three children together.
