= Solange Gemayel =

Lebanese first lady (born 1949)

- صولانج الجميل
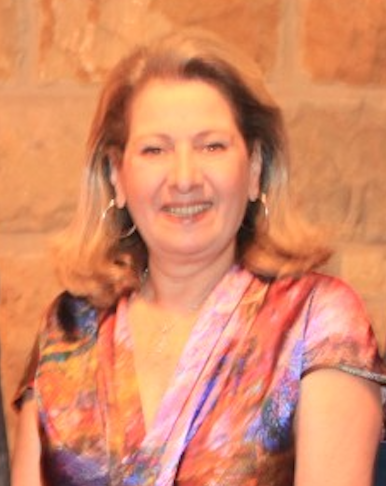
- Solange Gemayel, 2010

First Lady-designate of Lebanon
- In role 23 August 1982 – 14 September 1982
- President: Bachir Gemayel
- Preceded by: Iris Handaly
- Succeeded by: Joyce Gemayel

Personal details
- Born: Solange Tutunji; 1949 (age 76–77) Beirut, Lebanon
- Party: Kataeb Party
- Spouse: Bachir Gemayel (m. 1977; died 1982)
- Children: Maya Gemayel (murdered); Youmna Gemayel; Nadim Gemayel

Solange Gemayel (Arabic: صولانج الجميل, romanized: Ṣūlānj al-Jumayyil; born 1949) is a Lebanese political figure and former First Lady of Lebanon. The widow of former President-elect Bachir Gemayel (1947–1982), who was assassinated days before he was due to take office in 1982. She co-founded the Bachir Gemayel Foundation to keep her late husband's legacy alive.

== Political activities and views ==
Solange Gemayel strongly opposed the Syrian military presence in Lebanon, and was an enemy of the Syrian-backed government which took power in 1990. She is strongly pro-Western In 2002, she openly condemned Karim Pakradouni as the Kataeb's "imposed by force" leader and argued that he betrayed the real Phalange values that her husband fought for during his lifetime.

Hosting a formal dinner at her home in August 2003, she praised what she called America's "historic step" to "establish democracy, fight terrorism, make peace and give the people a taste of freedom." She also joined her son, Nadim, in endorsing Hikmat Dib of the Free Patriotic Movement in an important byelection. This put her (and her son) at odds with her brother-in-law, former President Amine Gemayel, who endorsed the more moderate Henri Helou. Helou won, but by a much smaller margin than had been expected.

She was an outspoken critic at several major demonstrations against the Syrian presence and the Syrian-backed government, in the wake of the 14 February assassination of former Prime Minister Rafik Hariri.

Ghattas Khoury declared in May 2005 that he would withdraw from the Beirut elections for the sole Maronite seat, enabling Saad Hariri to include Solange Gemayel on his list. Saad Hariri announced on 16 May 2005 that Gemayel would contest the election as a member of a multiconfessional electoral ticket he had compiled. On 30 May 2005, Gemayel was elected to represent the Beirut constituency. In 2009 elections, she stepped out the race in favor of her son, Nadim.

== Personal life ==
Solange belongs on her father’s side distant to the Tutunji family which traces its roots to Aleppo, in present-day Syria and her mother is native to Beirut. She married Bachir Gemayel in March 1977. Their first daughter, Maya, was born the following year. She was killed in 1980, by a car bomb intended against her father. A second daughter, Youmna, was born in 1980, and a son, Nadim, in 1982, only months before his father's assassination. Solange Gemayel raised her two surviving children to carry on their late father's legacy. Nadim indicated his intention to follow in the footsteps of his father and mother by participating in the political process.

In October 2017, the Lebanese justice sentenced the killers of Bachir Gemayel, 35 years after the killing, a trial she said she "had been expecting".

Honorary titles
Preceded by Iris Handaly	First Lady of Lebanon; Designate; 1982	Succeeded by Joyce Gemayel
