= Antoine Ghanem =

Lebanese politician (1943–2007)

- Born: 10 August 1943; Tohwita, Beirut
- Died: 19 September 2007 (aged 64); Sin el Fil, Beirut
- Resting place: Tohwita, Beirut
- Education: Université Saint-Joseph; University of Lyon
- Occupation: Lawmaker

Antoine Ghanem (Arabic: أنطوان غانم; 10 August 1943 – 19 September 2007) was a Lebanese politician and an MP in the Lebanese Parliament. He was also a member of the Kataeb party and the March 14 Coalition. He was murdered on 19 September 2007 in a car bomb explosion in the Sin el Fil suburb of Beirut. He was the eighth anti-Syrian figure assassinated since the assassination of Rafik Hariri on 14 February 2005.

== Early life and education ==
Ghanem was born in the Tohwita suburb of Beirut on 10 August 1943. He attended the Collège Notre Dame in Furn el Chebek and the Collège du Sacré-Cœur in Gemmayzeh, both private Catholic schools. After earning a degree in law from the Université Saint-Joseph in Beirut and the University of Lyon, he taught law for several years at the Lebanese University. He joined the Kataeb Party in 1961 and later became head of its Baabda District.

== Political career ==
In 2000, Ghanem was elected to the Lebanese Parliament for Baabda constituency, running on the list of Druze leader Walid Jumblat. A member of the block of the "democratic meeting" Qornet Chehwan Gathering, he enjoyed nevertheless a certain autonomy considering his membership of the Kataeb Party. He supported Amine Gemayel in the political struggle within the Kataeb Party, countered the pro-Syrian president of the party Karim Pakradouni and posted himself as an important speaker within the reforming Movement of the Kataeb Party directed by Gemayel.

In September 2004, he voted against the extension of President Émile Lahoud's term. He actively participated in the Cedar Revolution after the assassination of former Prime Minister Rafiq Hariri.

He was re-elected in 2005 to his post of deputy and seat to the political council of the Kataeb Party, after the reunification of this party and the reconciliation between Gemayel and Pakradouni.

== Personal life ==
Ghanem was married to Lolla Abdallah Neemeh. They had four children.

== Assassination ==
Ghanem returned to Beirut from Abu Dhabi on 16 September 2007, just two days before the assassination. Like many other anti-Syrian legislators, he used to travel abroad during the summer months due to safety concerns. According to reports, nearly forty 14 March MPs including him traveled abroad after the assassination of Walid Eido and returned to Lebanon two days before the assassination. Ghanem and the other MPs stayed at the Phoenicia InterContinental Hotel under heavy security after their return.

The car-bomb that killed him along with at least six others, including his two bodyguards, one of whom is Antoine Daou, exploded at a junction of a main street filled with rush hour traffic in the densely populated and mostly Christian neighborhood of Horsh Tabet in Sin el Fil. The bomb was reported to be booby-trapped. Ghanem was at the age of 64. According to source who looked into the assassination, it was linked to Unit 121 that was responsible of a large number of assassinations in Lebanon.

=== Perpetrators ===
Kuwaiti newspaper Al Seyassah reported that the Ghanem assassination was a direct result of Syria re-opening its borders with Lebanon on 17 September 2007, two days before the assassination. According to Al Seyassah's sources inside Syria, the assassination was performed by Syrian intelligence, who continuously monitored Ghanem's movements. The agents rented two apartments, one near the residence of Ghanem in Qlei'at and the other near the crime scene in Sin el Fil. The sources revealed that the killers left Lebanon immediately after the assassination, completely disguised as Syrian workers.

=== Burial ===
Ghanem's body was buried in the Beirut suburb of Tohwita.

== See also ==
- List of assassinated Lebanese politicians
- List of extrajudicial killings and political violence in Lebanon
