= Ghattas Khoury =

Lebanese politician

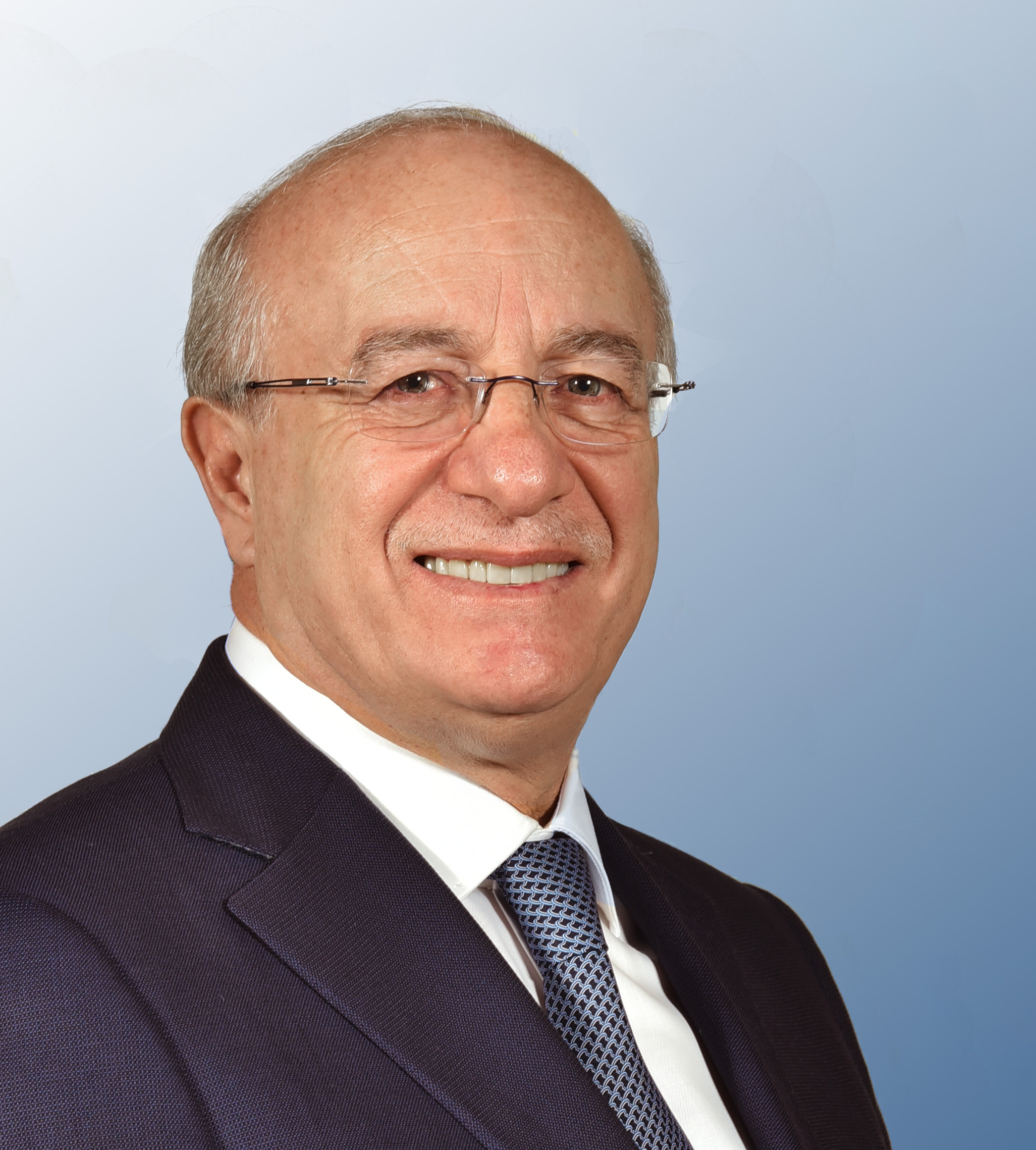
Ghattas Khoury

Ghattas Khoury is a professor of general and vascular surgery at the American University of Beirut Medical Center and a Lebanese politician. He is the former minister of culture in Lebanon (2016–2019). He is also a former member of the Lebanese parliament (2000–2005) and former president of the Lebanese Order of Physicians (1998–2001).

== Education ==
Khoury graduated from Marjeyoun National College and went on to study medicine at Complutense University of Madrid, graduating with a diploma in medicine in 1978. In 1983, he gained a diploma in general surgery from the American University of Beirut. He gained his degree in vascular surgery from St. Mary's Hospital, London, Imperial College, in 1984, and in 1986 a diploma in general surgery from the South East Thames Regional Health Authority. He also holds a Master's degree in diplomacy and strategic negotiations from La Sagesse University and the University of Paris-XI which he completed in 2013.

== Public service ==
In 1998, Khoury was elected president of the Lebanese Order of Physicians, where he served till 2001. During the 2000 parliamentary elections in Lebanon, he was elected Maronite deputy for Beirut on the list of former Prime Minister Rafic Hariri. As a member of parliament he joined the Parliamentary Committee for Public Health and Social Affairs. In 2005, Khoury withdrew his candidacy from the parliamentary elections in favor of Solange Bachir Gemayel in Beirut. During Prime Minister Saad Hariri's second government in 2016, he was appointed minister of culture and served in this capacity till 2019.
