= Cedric Koukjian =

Industrial designer and sculptor

- Born: 1985 (age 40–41); Beirut, Lebanon
- Known for: Sculptures
- Style: Post modernist

Cedric Koukjian (born 1985) is an industrial designer and sculptor based in Geneva, known for his monumental sculptures. His works explores themes of unity, resilience, and the bonds that shape societies and individuals. He frequently incorporates the motif of the chain which he has used in various sculptures made from materials such as steel, marble, and granite. Several of his works have been installed in public spaces including permanent sculptures in Cologny and Bikfaya, as well as a permanent sculpture in the collection of Beit Beirut Museum in Lebanon. His works have been presented at several art exhibitions including the 2022 outdoor sculpture show in Gstaad.

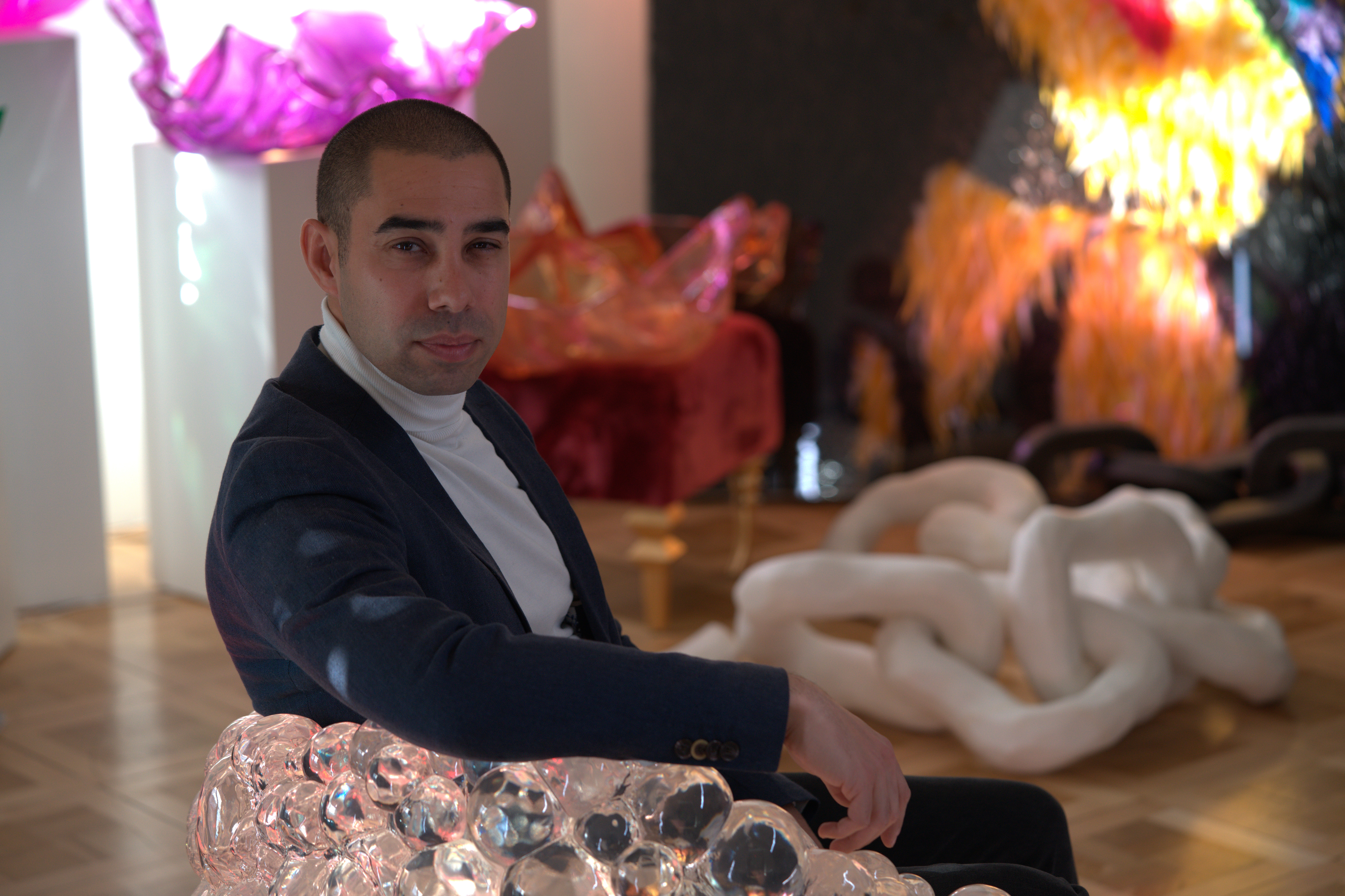
Designer Cedric Koukjian in his studio in Geneva.

== Early life and education ==
Cedric Koukjian was born in Beirut. Koukjian pursued a Bachelor's degree in Economics and International Relations at the University of the West of England (UWE), graduating in 2007. He later obtained a GIA certification in Bangkok. Today Koukjian lives in Geneva.

== Career ==
=== Notable works ===
- Link (series): A series of smaller sculptures exploring the theme of connection through chains carved from a single block of stone.
- Liaison'(2020): A 2.6-meter hand-hammered stainless steel sculpture installed in Cologny.
- Liaison Hyperion (2022): A 3-meter hand-hammered stainless steel sculpture installed in Cologny.
- Liaison Ba'al (2023): A 3.5-meter sculpture installed in Faqra. Crafted in hand-hammered stainless steel.
- X-Link (2023): A 4.5-meter permanent installation in Cologny.
- Chaîne de Lumière (2025): A 4.6-meter permanent sculpture installed in Bikfaya.
- Liaison SAWA (2025): A 4.6-meter permanent sculpture installed atop the Beit Beirut museum.
- Link of freedom (2025): A 5.2 meter sculpture installed in the University of the west of England campus.
