= Nadim Gemayel =

Lebanese politician (born 1982)

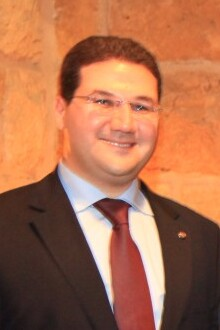
- Nadim Gemayel in 2010
- Born: 1 May 1982 (age 44); Bikfaya, Lebanon
- Occupation: Politician
- Title: Vice-President, Achrafieh Kataeb District
- Political party: Kataeb Party
- Parent(s): Bachir Gemayel (assassinated); Solange Gemayel
- Family: Gemayel family
- Website: Official website

Nadim Bachir Gemayel (Arabic: نديم الجميل, born 1 May 1982) is a Lebanese politician and member of the Lebanese parliament since 2009. He is a member of the Kataeb party that was founded by his grandfather Pierre Gemayel and is the son of the assassinated president-elect Bachir Gemayel.

== Early life and education ==
Nadim Gemayel was born in Bikfaya on 1 May 1982 to Solange Gemayel (née Toutounji), and Bashir Gemayel, a Maronite Christian from Bikfaya, Mount Lebanon. Nadim is the youngest to two sisters, Youmna (born 1980) and Maya (born 1978). Maya was only 18 months old when she was killed in 1980 by a car bomb that was intended for her father.

Nadim Gemayel's father, Bachir Gemayel, was a prominent national leader in Lebanon and an elected President of the Republic in 1982. Bashir was assassinated on 14 September 1982, 21 days after being elected president. Nadim was only four months old when his father was killed.

Following high school, Nadim Gemayel moved to France to pursue his law degree and graduated from Panthéon-Assas University in 2004. He currently practices law with a prominent law firm which maintains offices in Lebanon and Qatar.

In addition to his position inside the Kataeb party, Nadim Gemayel holds a seat in the Lebanese Parliament and serves as co-chairperson of the Bachir Gemayel Foundation, founded in 1982 following the murder of his father.

== Political career ==
Believing in what he says was his father's dream of freeing Lebanon from all foreign occupiers and unifying its people, Nadim Gemayel started his political struggle at a relatively young age. He has successfully secured a prominent position within the Kataeb Party in spite of many obstacles, and has won parliamentary elections in Achrafieh where he enjoys an undisputed popularity.

=== Syrian hegemony 1994–2005 ===
Following Bachir Gemayel's assassination in 1982, Lebanon entered an era where Syrian control began, and culminated in 1990 with the Syrian takeover of the Presidential Palace of Baabda.

Nadim Gemayel started his struggle against the Syrians by participating and leading Anti-Syrian demonstrations, organizing sit-ins with other Anti-Syrian factions inside the universities, and lobbying for Lebanon during his university years outside Lebanon.

Nadim Gemayel's most notable appearances, apart from his annual speech, were during the MTV shutdown in 2002, where he was at the forefront of the demonstration to reopen the station, defying the Syrian-Lebanese security apparatus and almost got arrested, and the 2003 Baabda-Aley elections.

=== Cedar Revolution 2005 ===
The assassination of former prime minister Rafic Hariri in 2005 triggered a series of demonstrations against the Syrian troops and the Lebanese security officials. Those demonstrations culminated on 14 March 2005, which was later on known to anti-Syrian factions as the "Cedar Revolution".

Nadim Gemayel was present throughout the period and was among many Anti-Syrian political factions to set up a tent with their supporters in Martyrs' Square demanding the resignation of the government and the security officials, the complete and unconditioned withdrawal of Syrian troops and the establishment of an international commission to investigate the assassination of then- Lebanese Prime Minister Hariri and past political assassinations.

=== Kataeb ===
The Cedar Revolution was followed by an almost complete Syrian withdrawal on 26 April 2005 after international pressure chiefly by the Americans and Europeans.

Despite the Syrian withdrawal, Syria was still present politically through its intelligence officers and the alliances with Lebanese factions it had established.

Nadim Gemayel saw this as Lebanon's second independence and a historic opportunity to launch his political career officially and engage the Kataeb party, to fight Syrian security officials in Lebanon.

On 26 April 2006, the Kataeb district in Achrafieh, after months of renovation, was opened and launched by Nadim Gemayel. The ceremony included a speech by Nadim Gemayel embodying his political beliefs and goals, and was finalized by a prayer and lighting candles on his father's memorial. Nadim Gemayel addressed the Lebanese and the Christians mainly urging them to unite under one banner to "build a sovereign state". He also stressed on Hezbollah's weapons, calling them illegitimate and asked that only the Lebanese armed forces carry weapons. He continued "We are with dialogue without any preconditions… What we care for are Lebanon's people and the future of its youth."

=== Member of Parliament ===
Nadim Gemayel decided to run for the Parliamentary elections in Beirut's first District (Ashrafieh, Rmeil, Sayfi) his main rival for the Maronite seat was Massoud Al Achkar. He ran as a Kataeb and 14 March candidate alongside Gebran Tueni's daughter Nayla Tueni. The election on 7 June 2009 was a very close race to the parliament, Nadim Gemayel won the Maronite seat in Beirut's first district and is not anymore an MP in the new Lebanese Parliament. Nayla Tueni also won the Greek Orthodox seat in the same district.

In 2018, the party held the elections based on a discourse inspired by protest movements, and attempted to re-brand itself away. However, it failed to make any gains in the elections, losing two of its parliamentary seats and gaining only three seats, two of whom for party leader and Amine Gemayel's son Samy Gemayel, and Nadim Gemayel with 4,096 votes in the new Beirut I district. Nadim Gemayel joined the Lebanese Forces-led list, together with the Ramgavars and Michel Pharaon, and with support from Antoun Sehnaoui, fielded their list under the label "Beirut I".

In the 2022 Lebanese general election, the Kataeb Party made gains. On 2 April Nadim Gemayel promoted his candidacy in a speech during a small event. The Kataeb Party won two seats with Nadim Gemayel and Jean Talouzian of the Armenian Catholic seat. The ticket under the name Lubnan Al Siyada (Sovereign Lebanon) received 24% of the votes in the party's historical stronghold.
