= Joyce Gemayel =

First Lady of Lebanon from 1982 to 1988

- جويس الجميل

First Lady of Lebanon
- In role 23 September 1982 – 22 September 1988
- President: Amine Gemayel
- Preceded by: Solange Gemayel
- Succeeded by: Nadia El-Chami

Personal details
- Born: Joyce Tyan Lebanon
- Party: Kataeb Party
- Spouse: Amine Gemayel (m. 1967)
- Children: Nicole Gemayel; Pierre Gemayel; Samy Gemayel

Joyce Gemayel (Arabic: جويس الجميل) (born Joyce Tyan, Arabic: جويس تيان) is the former First Lady of Lebanon from 1982 to 1988, wife of former President of Lebanon Amine Gemayel, and mother of the assassinated politician Pierre Amine Gemayel, and Samy Gemayel.

== Personal life ==
Joyce Tyan married Amine Gemayel in 1967, becoming part "of one of Lebanon's most prominent Christian political dynasties." They have three children, Nicole, Pierre and Samy.

Pierre Gemayel was assassinated on 21 November 2006. Images of Joyce Gemayel grieving her son were widely used in global media reports, illustrating the "tears and cries of anger" of the mourners. Subsequently, and alongside her husband, Gemayel spoke out against politically motivated killings in Lebanon, and encouraged Christian Lebanese to be "united" in opposition to Syrian influence in the country.

Honorary titles
Preceded by Solange Gemayel	First Lady of Lebanon; 1982–1988	Succeeded by Nadia El-Chami
