= Koura =

Koura may refer to:

- Koura District, or El-Koura, a district in North Lebanon
- Koura, Yemen, a village in Lawdar District of the Abyan Governorate, Yemen
- Kōura is the Māori name for the New Zealand freshwater crayfish, Paranephrops
- Koura (administrative division), administrative term used by Muslims to refer to regions that were under Roman rule
