= Kataeb Party =

Lebanese Christian democratic political party

Kataeb Party – Lebanese Social Democratic Party حزب الكتائب اللبنانية – الحزب الديمقراطي الاجتماعي اللبناني
- Abbreviation: Kataeb
- Secretary-General: Walid Fares
- President: Samy Gemayel
- Founder: Pierre Gemayel
- Founded: 5 November 1936
- Headquarters: Saifi, Beirut
- Military wing: Kataeb Regulatory Forces (1937–1961, 1961–1980)
- Ideology: Lebanese nationalism; Christian democracy; Social conservatism; Maronite politics; Historical: Phalangism; Christian nationalism; Phoenicianism
- Political position: Centre-right to right-wing; Historical: Right-wing to far-right
- Religion: Mostly Christianity (officially secular)
- National affiliation: Helf Alliance (1968–1969); Lebanese Front (1976–1986); March 14 Alliance (2005–2016); Lebanese Opposition (2016–2025)
- European affiliation: European People's Party (regional partner)
- International affiliation: Centrist Democrat International; International Democracy Union
- Colours: Green; White; Brown (customary)
- Slogan: "God. Homeland. Family."
- Military wing: Kataeb Regulatory Forces (1961–1980); Lebanese Forces (1980–1985)
- Parliament of Lebanon: 5 / 128
- Cabinet of Lebanon: 1 / 24

Party flag

Website
- lebanesekataeb.com/home/

The Kataeb Party (lit. 'Battalions Party'), officially the Kataeb Party – Lebanese Social Democratic Party (Arabic: حزب الكتائب اللبنانية – الحزب الديمقراطي الاجتماعي اللبناني Ḥizb al-Katā'ib al-Lubnānīya), historically known as the Phalangist Party, is a Lebanese nationalist political party in Lebanon.

Founded by Pierre Gemayel in 1936, the party and its paramilitary wing, the Kataeb Regulatory Forces, played a major role in the Lebanese Civil War (1975–1990), opposing Palestinian insurgency in South Lebanon as well as collaborating with Israel. During the war, the party was part of the Lebanese Front coalition, while it paramilitary wing was part of the Lebanese Forces militia and was involved in the Black Saturday massacre, Tel al-Zaatar massacre, Ehden massacre, and the Karantina massacre. In 1982, Pierre's youngest son Bachir, the leader of the Lebanese Forces, was elected President of Lebanon, but was assassinated before he could take office. This led to the militia committing the infamous Sabra and Shatila massacre during the 1982 war, with support from the IDF.

Bachir was succeeded by his older brother Amine, who led the party through much of the war. In decline in the late 1980s and 1990s during the Syrian occupation of Lebanon, the party slowly re-emerged in the early 2000s and is currently part of the Lebanese opposition. The party currently holds 4 out of the 128 seats in the Lebanese Parliament.

== Names ==
The Lebanese Phalanges Party is also known as Phalanges Libanaises in French and either Kataeb (الكتائب اللبنانية al-Katā'ib al-Lubnāniyya) or Phalangist Party (حزب الكتائب اللبنانية Ḥizb al-Katā'ib al-Lubnāniyya) in Arabic. Kataeb is the plural of Katiba which is a translation into Arabic of the Greek word phalanx ("battalion") which is also the origin of the Spanish term Falange. In 2021, the party changed its official name to "The Kataeb Party – Lebanese Social Democratic Party" (Arabic: حزب الكتائب اللبنانيّة – الحزب الديمقراطي الاجتماعي اللبناني, Hiẓb al-Katā'ib al-Lubnāniyya – Hiẓb al-dīmūqrāṭī al-ijtimāʿī al-lubnānī).

== Origins ==
The Kataeb party was established on November 5, 1936 as a Maronite paramilitary youth organization by Pierre Gemayel who modeled the party after the Nazi Party, the Spanish Falange, and Italian Fascist parties, all of which he had encountered as an Olympic athlete during the 1936 Summer Olympics held in Berlin, then Nazi Germany. The movement's uniforms originally included brown shirts, and its members used the Fascist salute.

=== Relationship to Falangism ===
Despite sharing the name "Phalange" (from the Greek phalanx), scholars note that early Lebanese Phalangism differed fundamentally in its ideology and objectives from original Spanish Falangism. According to historian Christian Thuselt, the Kataeb's appropriation of European fascist-style aesthetics and rallies was a "symbolic appropriation" aimed at adapting European propaganda techniques to gain support among Lebanese youth rather than an adoption of European fascist ideology.

The contrast lies in how the Falange Española de las JONS outlined an explicitly authoritarian and national-syndicalist program in its 27 Points in which it called for the abolition of political parties in favor of a totalitarian syndicate-run state. Earlier writings from the party's precursor magazine, La Conquista del Estado, promoted romantic Iberian pan-nationalism. Meanwhile, the Kataeb Party sought to frame its doctrine as Lebanese nationalism, multi-confessionalism, and maintenance of Lebanese sovereignty over Syrian pan-nationalism. In early party declarations compiled by founder Pierre Gemayel, the movement rejected totalitarianism, supported a free-market economy, and positioned itself as a civic and patriotic youth organization dedicated to preserving Lebanon's existing borders and parliamentary framework. Despite this, scholars like Fawwaz Traboulsi note that even while rejecting European-style totalitarianism in its official rhetoric, the Kataeb operated as a militant, hierarchical, Maronite-dominated paramilitary force whose rigid national dogma, street mobilization, and sectarian chauvinism laid the groundwork for its violent role in the 1958 crisis and atrocities during the Lebanese Civil War, such as the Sabra and Shatila massacre.

=== Founding ===
In an interview by Robert Fisk, Gemayel stated about Nazism and the Berlin Olympics:

I was the captain of the Lebanese football team and the president of the Lebanese Football Federation. We went to the Olympic Games of 1936 in Berlin. And I saw then this discipline and order. And I said to myself: "Why can't we do the same thing in Lebanon?" So when we came back to Lebanon, we created this youth movement. When I was in Berlin then, Nazism did not have the reputation that it has now. Nazism? In every system in the world, you can find something good. But Nazism was not Nazism at all. The word came afterwards. In their system, I saw discipline. And we in the Middle East, we need discipline more than anything else.

Pierre founded the party along with four other young Lebanese: Charles Helou, who later became a President of Lebanon, Chafic Nassif, Emile Yared, and Georges Naccache. Gemayel was chosen to lead the organization, in part because he was not a political figure at that time.

During the first years of the Kataeb Party, the Party was strongly opposed to having any group dominate Lebanon. They opposed the pan-Arabists who tried to take over Lebanon and also the French, whom they saw as trying to infiltrate their culture and impose themselves within Lebanon. Gemayel and the Kataeb Party advocated for an independent and sovereign Lebanon free of all foreign influence. They actively took part in the struggle against the French Mandate, until Lebanese independence was proclaimed in November 1943. The party motto was "God, Nation and Family."

In the 1950s, the Phalanges, deliberately emphasized French personalist thinking in their ideological framework, particularly influenced by the works of French Christian Existentialist philosopher Emmanuel Mounier (1905–1950). Mounier's ideas, which gained prominence among Catholic students in France during the 1930s, were integral in shaping the party's philosophical underpinnings. In the Kataeb's first party program, presented at their inaugural congress in 1956, the party clearly reflected Mounier's personalist principles, which advocated for a society of citizens rather than mere collective nationalism. This approach starkly contrasted with the ideology of the Syrian Social Nationalist Party (SSNP), which emphasized the primacy of the nation over the intrinsic value of the individual. The adoption of these ideas marked a significant shift within the party and was particularly popularized by young Phalangist intellectuals who had encountered Mounier's thought during their university studies in France.

The influence of the Phalangists was very limited in the early years of Lebanon's independence but came to prominence as a strong ally of the government in the 1958 crisis. In the aftermath of the crisis, Gemayel was appointed to the cabinet, and two years later, was elected to the National Assembly.

In 1968, the party joined the Helf Alliance formed with the two other big mainly Christian parties in Lebanon: the National Liberal Party of former President Camille Chamoun, and National Bloc of Raymond Eddé, and won 9 seats of 99 in the 1968 parliamentary elections, making it one of the largest groupings in Lebanon's notoriously fractured political system. By the end of the decade, the party created its own militia, the Kataeb Regulatory Forces (KRF) and soon clashes began with the rising Palestinian militant guerrillas.

By the 1970s, the party had become a political giant in Lebanon, with an estimated membership of 60,000 to 70,000. The vast majority (85%) of members were Maronites, but some were members of minority Christian communities, Shiites, Druze, and Jews.

== Kataeb Regulatory Forces ==
The Phalange party's militia was not only the largest and best organized political paramilitary force in Lebanon but also the oldest. It was founded in 1937 as the "Militants' organization" by the President of the Party Pierre Gemayel and William Hawi, a Lebanese-American glass industrialist, who led them during the 1958 civil war. Fighting alongside the pro-government forces, the Phalangists defended the Metn region.

Disbanded in January 1961 by order of the Kataeb Party's Political Bureau, Hawi created in their place the Kataeb Regulatory Forces. In order to coordinate the activities of all Phalange paramilitary forces, the Political Bureau set up the Kataeb War Council (Arabic: Majliss al-Harbi) in 1970, with William Hawi being appointed as head. The seat of the Council was allocated at the Kataeb Party's Headquarters at the heart of Ashrafieh quarter in East Beirut and a quiet expansion of KRF units followed suit, complemented by the development of a training infrastructure.

Two company-sized Special Forces units, the "1st Commando" and the "2nd Commando" were created in 1963, soon followed by the "Pierre Gemayel" squad (later a company) and a VIP protection squad. To this was added in 1973 another commando platoon (Arabic: Maghaweer) and a "Combat School" was secretly opened at Tabrieh, near Bsharri in the Keserwan District. Another special unit, the "Bashir Gemayel brigade" – named after Pierre Gemayel's youngest son, Bashir – was formed in 1964, absorbing the old "PG" company in the process.

Considered by many analysts as the best organized of all militia "fiefs" in the whole of Lebanon under the leadership of "chef" Boutros Khawand, it was administered by a network of Phalangist-controlled business corporations headed by the GAMMA Group "brain-trust", backed by the DELTA computer company, and the SONAPORT holding. The latter had run since 1975 the legal commercial ports of Jounieh and Beirut, including the infamous clandestine "Dock Five" – "Cinquième basin" in French – from which the Phalange extracted additional revenues by levying illegal taxes and carried out arms-smuggling operations. The KRF was served by a clandestine-built airstrip, the Pierre Gemayel International Airport, opened in 1976 at Hamat, north of Batroun, and had its own radio station "The Voice of Lebanon" (Arabic: Iza'at Sawt Loubnan) or "La Voix du Liban" (VDL) in French set up in 1976.

In July–August of that same year, the Phalangists headed alongside its allies, the Army of Free Lebanon, Al-Tanzim, NLP Tigers Militia, Guardians of the Cedars (GoC), the Tyous Team of Commandos (TTC) and the Lebanese Youth Movement (LYM) in the sieges – and subsequent massacres – of Karantina, al-Masklah and Tel al-Zaatar Massacres at the Muslim-populated slum districts and adjacent Palestinian refugee camps of East Beirut, and at the town of Dbayeh in the Metn.

During the 1975–76 phase of the Lebanese Civil War, the Kataeb Regulatory Forces' own mobilization and street action skills allowed the Kataeb to become the primary and most fearsome fighting force in the Christian-conservative camp.

At Beirut and elsewhere, Phalange militia sections were heavily committed in several battles against Lebanese National Movement (LNM) leftist militias and suffered considerable casualties, notably at the Battle of the Hotels in October 1975 where they fought the al-Murabitoun and the Nasserite Correctionist Movement (NCM), and later at the 'Spring Offensive' held against Mount Lebanon in March 1976.

== Main events ==
=== 1936–1943 ===
In 1943, the Kataeb played an instrumental role in attaining Lebanon's first independence from the French mandate. During this period, Kataeb led many social struggles to consolidate national cohesion and promote individual liberties and social welfare. The Kataeb elaborated the first Lebanese "labour charter" in 1937. It was a pioneering initiative as it called for a minimum wage, a limitation of working hours, and paid leaves. The Kataeb was one of the first Lebanese parties to have a solid avant-garde economic program and organized social activism throughout Lebanon.

1941 saw the creation of the first women section in a Lebanese Party. It called openly for stopping any kind of discrimination towards women. Since 1939, the Party has issued Al Amal, a leading bilingual political publication.

=== 1943–1958 ===
The Kataeb Party entered the political and parliamentary scene during the late 1940s after a period in which it refrained from entering the political arena to focus mainly on the promotion of the youth and on social issues, away from the trivialities of post-mandate politics.

Kataeb struggled to preserve Lebanon's independence facing the growing appetite of its neighbors. The Party expanded considerably its presence throughout the territory and attracted thousands of new members, undoubtedly forming one of the largest parties in the Middle East. Kataeb adopted a modern organization which made its fame and became its trademark. In 1958 the Kataeb was the key actor in confronting the coup influenced by pan-Arabists led by Gamal Abdel Nasser, President of the ephemeral United Arab Republic (Egypt, Syria, and Yemen), and succeeded in maintaining Lebanon's independence and liberal identity.

=== 1958–1969 ===
After having succeeded in preserving the Lebanese formula, Kataeb Party ranks grew considerably and reached 70,000 members, out of a total population of 2.2 million. The Party achieved many electoral successes and became the main Christian component of successive governments. During the ministerial mandates held by its members, it made elementary education mandatory, and improved the public school infrastructure. On a social level, the Kataeb Party introduced "labor laws" and contributed decisively to social security law. The party played a key role in promoting modern institutions that are still today the pillars of the Lebanese administrative system, including the Civil Service Council, the Central Inspection Board, and many others.

Pierre Gemayel, leader of the party and minister of public works, gave Lebanon a large part of its modern infrastructure by completing 440 development projects during his term. Lebanon was at its peak and became a first-tier destination for world tourism. But what was labeled as the "Switzerland of the Middle East" was a shaky construction, with the influx of Palestinian refugees after 1949 setting the stage for an ominous future.

=== 1970–1982 ===
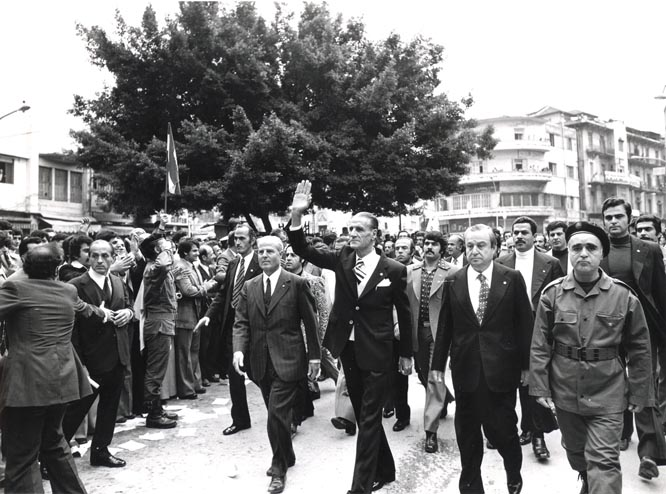
Pierre Gemayel and William Hawi celebrating the anniversary of the Kataeb in 1971.

In the early 1970s, Christian leaders in Lebanon feared that the Palestine Liberation Organization (PLO) was increasingly operating in Lebanon as a state within a state. While it is contested whether the Palestinian presence was a cause of the Lebanese Civil War, Lebanon's political balance had been fragile since 1958 and political tensions were already running high among the Lebanese.

The Lebanese Civil War erupted in 1975 following the Ain ar-Rummaneh Bus Massacre, which was carried out by Phalangist militants and regarded as the starting point of the Lebanese civil war. Following this development, and coupled with the disintegration of the state institutions and the army, the country became an open battlefield. Many foreign states were directly and militarily involved in the Lebanese conflict, especially Syria, which, under the banner of Arab solidarity, tried to impose its authority upon the country, and Israel, which invaded Lebanon in 1978. The Kataeb Party, along with other political parties, formed the Lebanese Forces and battled to preserve Lebanese independence. During the war, the Phalangists were responsible for several massacres, including the Tel al-Zaatar massacre, the Black Saturday massacre, the Karantina massacre, and the Sabra and Shatilla massacre.

The Kataeb Party succeeded in getting two of its leaders elected to the presidency. President-elect Bachir Gemayel, son of Pierre Gemayel and leader of the Lebanese Forces, was assassinated in 1982 when an explosion rocked the Party's headquarters in the Achrafieh area of Beirut. The architect of the blast was a member of the Syrian Social Nationalist Party. In the aftermath of the assassination, Amin Gemayel, the eldest son of Pierre Gemayel, was elected President of the Lebanese Republic. The Kataeb Party was heavily supported by Israel throughout the Civil War and, with the support of the IDF, committed the Sabra and Shatilla massacre in 1982, during which Phalangist members murdered hundreds of Palestinian civilians and destroyed much of the Sabra and Shatilla refugee camp.

The 1982 Israeli Judicial inquiry into the Sabra and Shatila massacre estimated that when fully mobilized, the Phalange had 5,000 fighters, of whom 2,000 were full-time. From the start of the invasion, Israeli Chief of Staff Rafael Eitan told the Phalange not to engage in any fighting.

=== 1982–1988 ===
Despite the turmoil caused by the civil strife in Lebanon and the raging wars that devastated the country, President Gemayel was able to accomplish many achievements during his presidential mandate. One of his first achievements was to rebuild the State's institutions and to reorganize and resupply the Army in preparation for the struggle to recover sovereignty and provide security for Lebanon. The same efforts to liberate the country culminated in the Agreement on Security Arrangements of 17 May 1983, which was somewhat an affirmation of the Armistice Agreement of 1949 with Israel even though this agreement was never concluded because of the opposition of Syria and then Israel.

Amin Gemayel called for and chaired national dialogue conferences in Geneva and Lausanne and succeeded in creating a national accord and the formation of a fully representative government. He rebuilt the Lebanese University and laid its modern foundation, introduced many economic reforms, and started to rebuild Beirut's central district. The war was still raging and Lebanon's neighbors, mainly Syria and Israel, expanded their influence in Lebanon. On the other hand, the Kataeb Party suffered a great loss with the death of its founder, Cheikh Pierre Gemayel in 1984.

The Sabra and Shatila massacre was the slaughter of between 762 and 3,500 civilians, almost all Palestinians, by a Lebanese Christian militia in the Sabra and Shatila Palestinian refugee camps in Beirut, Lebanon from approximately 6:00 pm 16 September to 8:00 am 18 September 1982. The massacre was presented as retaliation for the assassination of the newly elected Lebanese president Bachir Gemayel, the leader of the Lebanese Kataeb Party. The Phalangist militia was led by the intelligence chief Elie Hobeika. Many of the victims were tortured before they were killed. Women were raped and some victims were skinned alive. Others had limbs chopped off with axes.

=== 1989–2000 ===
In 1990, the Lebanese War came to a close when Syrian forces maintained their grip over the entire country leading to fifteen years of occupation during which President Amin Gemayel was exiled to France and the Kataeb Party fell under Syrian influence. Organized institutions that could endanger Syrian rule in Lebanon were systematically muzzled. Christian parties paid the highest price for their resistance to Syrian hegemony and their leaders were either eliminated, exiled, or imprisoned. Kataeb's spirit was still strong between its members and sympathizers. This started to be visible in the late 1990s when Kataeb students participated actively in the student and intellectual resistance that started to be heard.

On September 15, 1992, at 9:15 AM, Boutros Khawand was heading to Kataeb headquarters in Beirut when his car, a red Opel, was intercepted by two BMW cars and one red van, 100m away from his home. Between eight and ten gunmen were in the attacking squad, they pulled him out of his car and forced him into the van.

=== 2000–2010 ===
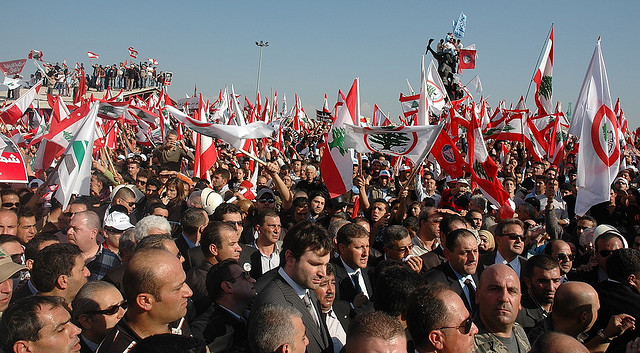
Protesters at Pierre Amine Gemayel's funeral

The revival of Lebanon and the Party: Amin Gemayel returned to Lebanon in June 2000 and was welcomed by large crowds that filled the streets and squares of Bikfaya. Pierre Amin Gemayel was elected MP for Metn district, signalling the rebirth of the Kataeb Party. "Kataeb opposition" was structured and began its activities within the framework of the "Kornet Shahwan Coalition", and then through the Bristol Gathering, which formed a platform for the joint Christian-Muslim opposition.

Eventually, all this led to the Independence Uprising in February 2005 and on 14 March 2005 more than a million Lebanese filled the streets of central Beirut to demand Syrian withdrawal and the restoration of sovereignty. The Kataeb Party extensively participated in the Cedar Revolution and MP Pierre Gemayel played a significant role in shaping this uprising which led to Lebanon's second independence.

Syrian troops effectively left Lebanon on 26 April 2005. At the same time, the Kataeb Party reunited and retrieved its historical role. Pierre Amin Gemayel played a key role in reuniting the Party in 2006. Pierre Gemayel was assassinated on 21 November 2006, and in 2007, the Party was dealt another blow when MP Antoine Ghanem was assassinated as well. During the 2009 general elections, under the leadership of Amine Gemayel, they managed to receive 5 seats in parliament.

=== 2020–present ===
In 2020, Kataeb Secretary-General Nazar Najarian was killed in the 2020 Beirut explosions on 4 August 2020, after a series of explosions had occurred at the Port of Beirut, sending debris across the city. He suffered head trauma and succumbed to his injuries. He was buried on 8 August 2020.

During the Lebanese general elections, candidates were announced on the 20 February 2022 under the campaign slogan Ma minsawim (ما منساوم ). Kataeb leader Samy Gemayel insisted that the Kataeb party was the only one that has "faced the fact of surrendering to Hezbollah's will, electing Michel Aoun as president and isolating Lebanon from its surroundings. Samy Gemayel emphasized:

We, as the Kataeb party, have alone faced surrender to Hezbollah's will, isolating Lebanon from its surroundings, electing Michel Aoun as president, the electoral law that gave the majority to Hezbollah, and quotas and fictitious budgets such as taxes, power ships, and seaports.

On 2 April Nadim Gemayel, a cousin of Samy, promoted his candidacy in a speech during a small event. Kataeb secured 4 seats for Salim Sayegh (3,477 votes), Nadim Gemayel (4,425 votes), Sami Gemayel (10,466 votes), and Elias Hankash (6,148 votes). A close ally of the party, Jean Talozian, also managed to wain a seat with 4,043 votes in Beirut I with Nadim.

In February 2025, Lebanese Prime Minister Nawaf Salam announced his government, which consists of 24 ministers; the Kataeb Party controls one portfolio: the Justice Ministry, headed by Adel Amin Nassar.

== War era and decline ==
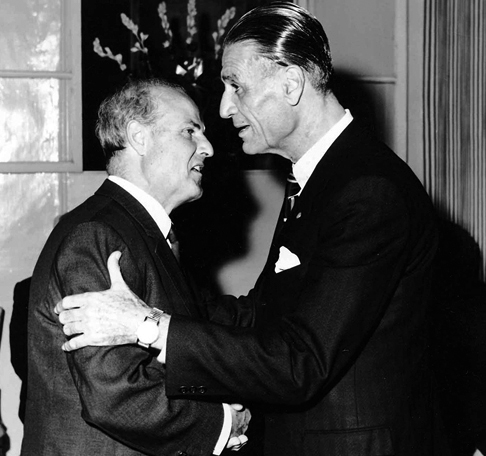
Pierre Gemayel and William Hawi, Chief of the Kataeb Security Council

Throughout the 1975 Civil War, the Phalange Party was the most important force within the Christian camp, and its militia carried out most of the fighting as part of the Lebanese Front, the mostly Christian rightist coalition.

In April 1975, four persons, among them two men close to the Gemayel family, were killed during an attack on a church inauguration ceremony by unknown attackers in the Beirut suburb of Ain El Remmaneh. In retaliation Phalangist militias killed 28 passengers of a bus later that day, most of them Palestinian with some that were deemed to be armed and were coming back from a rally at camp Tel el-Zaatar, since they suspected Palestinians to be behind the church attack. The Bus Massacre is commonly considered as the spark that set off the Lebanese Civil War.

In the following days, the 8,000-strong party militia, the Kataeb Regulatory Forces, together with its allies, the Tigers militia, Al-Tanzim, Marada Brigade, Guardians of the Cedars, Lebanese Youth Movement, Tyous Team of Commandos and other formations, was heavily engaged in street fights against the Palestinian militias and their allies in the anti-government secular Lebanese National Movement.

During the Lebanese Civil War, many predominantly Christian militias were formed that gained support from the north of Lebanon. These militias were staunchly right-wing, nationalist, and anti-Palestinian with a majority of their members being Maronite. The Kataeb party was the most powerful of these militias at the time of the Lebanese Civil War. The party later went on to help found the right-wing Lebanese Forces militia in 1977 which played a large role in the Lebanese Civil War.

In September 1982, Bachir Gemayel was elected President of Lebanon by the National Assembly. He was assassinated less than a month later in an operation thought to have been arranged by Syrian intelligence and was succeeded by his brother, Amine Gemayel. Bachir was thought to have been radical in his approach and hinted at possible peace agreements with Israel while trying to expel all Palestinian refugees from Lebanon. In contrast, Amine was thought to have been much more moderate.

On 16 September 1982, Elie Hobeika led the massacre of between 762 and 3,500 Palestinian refugees in the Sabra and Shatila refugee camps, while the periphery of the camps was under the control of the Israel Defense Forces.

After the death of Pierre Gemayel in 1984, his successors Elie Karamé and Amine Gemayel struggled to maintain influence over the actions of the Lebanese Army, which became virtually independent as Muslim recruits deserted and rebelled against the mostly Christian officer ranks. The Kataeb party began to decline, not playing a major role for the remainder of the war.

== Syrian occupation ==
The party, lacking direction, broke down into several rival factions. Georges Saadeh took control of the Party from 1986 until his death in 1998. He took a moderate position toward the Syrian presence. Mounir Hajj became the president of the party in 1999, followed by Karim Pakradouni in 2002. Amine Gemayel left Lebanon in 1988 after his mandate had ended, mainly to avoid a clash with Samir Geagea's Lebanese Forces and avoid more intra-Christian bloodshed. He returned in 2000 to oppose the Syrian role in Lebanon and to back his son Pierre's parliamentary election campaign, which he won.

His sons Pierre and Samy, had returned in 1997 and had been working on reorganizing the popular base of the party. His return was not welcomed by the established leadership of the party who had become government puppets. To distinguish themselves from the official leadership, Gemayel's supporters started referring to themselves as "The Kataeb Base" or "The Kataeb Reform Movement". General consensus amongst Lebanese always recognized Gemayel as the legitimate Leader of the party, not because of lineage but because of most of the popular support.

== Cedar Revolution ==
In March 2005 after the Rafik Hariri assassination, the Kataeb took part in an anti-Syrian presence demonstration, commonly known as the Cedar Revolution. It became a member of the March 14 Alliance, along with the Future Movement, Progressive Socialist Party, Lebanese Forces and other minor parties. The Kataeb won 4 seats in the June 2005 elections, 3 representing the Gemayel Leadership (Pierre Gemayel, Solange Gemayel, and Antoine Ghanem) and 1 representing the official leadership of the Party. They formed one parliamentary bloc after a reconciliation that took place in 2005.

This reconciliation was marketed as a gesture of goodwill from Pierre Amine Gemayel who deemed it was time to turn the page and give those who were unfaithful to the party principles a second chance. Practically, it was a way for Pakradouni and his men to leave the Party with as little humiliation as possible since the reconciliation deal stipulated the resignation of the entire political bureau after 2 years. This reconciliation saw Amine come back to the Party as Supreme President of the Party while Pakradouni stayed on as President.

Samy Gemayel, Amine's second son, had formed his own political ideas and identity at the time, much closer in principle and in a manner to those of his uncle Bachir. He was very opposed to Pakradouni and his Syrian ties and thus was not a fan of this reconciliation. This drew Samy away from the party and prompted him to create a Think-Tank/Research-Center on Federalism named Loubnanouna, "Our Lebanon".

== Siniora Government ==
In July 2005, the party participated in the Fouad Siniora Government, with Pierre Amine Gemayel as the minister of industry. Pierre played an important role in the reorganization and development of the party. His assassination in November 2006 was a major blow to the party. Syrian intelligence and "Fateh Al Islam" have been accused of the assassination. With 14 March Alliance forces, the party supports the Lebanese government against Hezbollah.

In September 2007 another Kataeb MP, Antoine Ghanem was assassinated in a car bombing. Solange Gemayel remained the party's only MP since Pierre Gemayel's seat was lost to the Free Patriotic Movement of Michel Aoun in a special election in August 2007.

In 2007, Samy Gemayel and most of his Loubnanouna companions rejoined the Kataeb, prompting a renaissance in the party.

== 2009 elections ==
In the 2009 parliamentary elections the Kataeb Party managed to win 5 seats. 1 in the Metn Caza, 1 in the Beirut-1 Caza, 1 in Zahle, 1 in the Aley Caza and another in the Tripoli Caza. The victories in Beirut-1 and Zahle as well as not allowing the opposition's list to win fully in Metn were major upsets to the General Aoun's FPM who is an ally of Iranian-backed Hezbollah, although the opposition's list was not 100% complete, leaving one Maronite seat vacant by purpose for the candidate of the Gemayel family.

These victories enabled Samy Gemayel, Nadim Gemayel (son of the assassinated President Bachir Gemayel), Elie Marouni, Fady el-Haber, and Samer Saade to join the Parliament. In the first Government of PM Saad Hariri, the Kataeb were assigned the Social Affairs portfolio.

== March 14 and the breakup ==
Disagreements between Kataeb and March 14 deepened in 2016 when the Lebanese Forces endorsed March 8 candidate Michel Aoun for presidency.

Kataeb left the government and, thus, the March 14 alliance in June 2016.

== The Kataeb Party today ==
Since the end of Syria's occupation of Lebanon in 2005, the Kataeb Party has been attracted once again to new generations and has regained its role as one of the major political actors in Lebanon. The Party has a large network in Lebanon and abroad and one cannot find a major city or town without a Kataeb presence.

The Party has an active parliamentary group and has MPs elected in nearly all major Christian constituencies such as Beirut, Metn, Zahlé, Aley, and the North. Kataeb Ministers have been particularly active in governments led by the 14 March coalition, namely in the Ministries of Industry, Social Affairs, and Tourism.

The Kataeb Party calls for an objective assessment of the Lebanese political system's limitations in order to guarantee the required political stability, security, and economic prosperity. The series of political crises that Lebanon witnessed since its first independence in 1943 highlighted the shortcomings of the consensual and unitary system and its inadequacy with pluralistic countries such as Lebanon.

During the 2009 parliamentary elections that saw the victory of the Party and its allies, Kataeb presented a comprehensive program under the title of "Pact of Stability". The vision of the Party revolves around the following main ideas:

- Adopting decentralization in order to be closer to the citizens and guarantee basic rights and freedoms, in order to manage constructively Lebanon's cultural pluralism and to ensure development in all parts of the Lebanese territory.
- Proclaiming the neutrality of Lebanon towards all armed conflicts in the region in order to protect Lebanon from external meddling in its affairs, except for the Arab-Israeli conflict.
- Safeguarding the secular State in Lebanon and completing its legal framework to guarantee the freedom of the individual and the respect of his rights and integrity.
- Ending the military status of several Lebanese and non-Lebanese groups such as Hezbollah, Palestinian armed militias, and other Islamist groups, and calling for their immediate disarmament.
- Committing to all relevant UN Security Council Resolutions, primarily 1559 (2004), 1680 (2006), 1701 (2006) and 1757 (2007).
- Rejecting any form of permanent settlement of Palestinian refugees in Lebanon at the expense of their right of return.
- Reforming the Lebanese Administration and adopting modern economic policies to stimulate the economy, ensure prosperity, and therefore stop emigration.

The Party is strongly concerned about the presence of Palestinian refugees with their regional and domestic ramifications. Notwithstanding that the Kataeb has recently attempted to improve the inhumane living conditions of refugees through Parliament, it remains concerned about latent or gradual attempts to force their permanent settlement in Lebanon.

On 11 March 2018, the Kataeb Party unveiled its 131-point platform, in which they expressed some progressive values such as decriminalizing homosexuality, abolishing capital punishment, removing censorship laws, and adopting a 30% female quota system in the parliament.

The secretary-general of the party, Nazar Najarian, was killed in the 2020 Port of Beirut explosions.

== 2022 elections ==
Candidates were announced on 20 February 2022 under the campaign slogan Ma minsawim (ما منساوم). Kataeb leader Samy Gemayel insisted that the Kataeb party was the only one that has faced the fact of surrendering to Hezbollah's will, electing Michel Aoun as president and isolating Lebanon from its surroundings. Samy Gemayel emphasized:

We, as the Kataeb party, have alone faced surrendering to Hezbollah's will, isolating Lebanon from its surroundings, electing Michel Aoun as president, the electoral law that gave the majority to Hezbollah, and quotas and fictitious budgets such as taxes, power ships, and seaports.

On 2 April Nadim Gemayel, cousin of Samy, promoted his candidacy in a speech during a small event.

Kataeb secured 4 seats for Salim Sayegh (3,477 votes), Nadim Gemayel (4,425 votes), Sami Gemayel (10,466 votes), and Elias Hankash (6,148 votes).

Name	District	Sect
Nadim Bachir Gemayel	Beirut 1	Maronite
Sami Amin Gemayel	Mount Lebanon 2 – Metn	Maronite
Elias Rakif Hankash	Mount Lebanon 2 – Metn	Maronite
Salim Boutros Sayegh	Mount Lebanon 1 – Kesserwan	Maronite
Adib Abdel Massih	North Lebanon 3 - Koura	Greek Orthodox

== Presidents of the Party ==
- Pierre Gemayel (1936–1984)
- Elie Karameh (1984–1986)
- Georges Saadeh (1986–1998)
- Mounir El Hajj (1998–2001)
- Karim Pakradouni (2001–2007)
- Amine Gemayel (2007–2015)
- Samy Gemayel (2015–present)

== Electoral performance ==
Election	Leader	Vote %	Seats	Government
1947	Pierre Gemayel		0 / 55	
1951	Pierre Gemayel		3 / 77	
1953	Pierre Gemayel		1 / 44	
1957	Pierre Gemayel		2 / 66	
1960	Pierre Gemayel		6 / 99	
1964	Pierre Gemayel		4 / 99	
1968	Pierre Gemayel		9 / 99	
1972	Pierre Gemayel		7 / 100	Saeb Salam-led Government
1992	Georges Saadeh		0 / 128	Rafic Hariri-led Unity Government
1996	Georges Saadeh		0 / 128	Rafic Hariri-led Unity Government
2000	Mounir El Hajj		3 / 128	Rafic Hariri-led Unity Government
2005	Karim Pakradouni	1.56%	3 / 128	March 14 Alliance-led Unity Government
2009	Amine Gemayel for Metn		5 / 128	March 14 Alliance-led Unity Government
2018	Samy Gemayel for Metn	1.82%	3 / 128	FPM-led Unity Government
2022	Samy Gemayel for Metn	1.86%	4 / 128	TBD

== See also ==
- Cedar Revolution
- Kataeb Regulatory Forces
- Lebanese Forces (militia)
- Najjadeh Party
- Political parties in Lebanon
- Qaa massacre
- Tyous Team of Commandos
- William Hawi

== General references ==
- Antoine J. Abraham, The Lebanon war, Greenwood Publishing Group, 1996. ISBN 0275953890
- Alain Menargues, Les Secrets de la guerre du Liban: Du coup d'état de Béchir Gémayel aux massacres des camps palestiniens, Albin Michel, Paris 2004. ISBN 978-2226121271 (in French)
- Barry Rubin (editor), Lebanon: Liberation, Conflict, and Crisis, Middle East in Focus, Palgrave Macmillan, London 2009. ISBN 978-1349373260 – Lebanon: Liberation, Conflict, and Crisis
- Denise Ammoun, Histoire du Liban contemporain: Tome 2, 1943–1990, Fayard, Paris 2005. ISBN 978-2-213-61521-9 (in French)
- Edgar O'Ballance, Civil War in Lebanon, 1975–92, Palgrave Macmillan, London 1998. ISBN 0333729757
- Farid El-Khazen, The Breakdown of the State in Lebanon 1967–1976, I.B. Tauris, London 2000. ISBN 0674081056
- Fawwaz Traboulsi, Identités et solidarités croisées dans les conflits du Liban contemporain, Thèse de Doctorat d'Histoire – 1993, Université de Paris VIII, 2007. (in French)
- Hazem Saghieh, Ta'rib al-Kata'eb al-Lubnaniyya: al-Hizb, al-sulta, al-khawf, Beirut: Dar al-Jadid, 1991. (in Arabic)
- Itamar Rabinovich, The war for Lebanon, 1970-1985, Cornell University Press, Ithaca and London 1989 (revised edition). ISBN 978-0-8014-9313-3, 0-8014-9313-7 – The War for Lebanon, 1970-1983
- Jean Sarkis, Histoire de la guerre du Liban, Presses Universitaires de France – PUF, Paris 1993. ISBN 978-2-13-045801-2 (in French).
- Jonathan Randall, The Tragedy of Lebanon: Christian Warlords, Israeli Adventurers, and American Bunglers, Just World Books, Charlottesville, Virginia 2012. ISBN 978-1935982166
- Matthew S. Gordon, The Gemayels (World Leaders Past & Present), Chelsea House Publishers, 1988. ISBN 978-1-55546-834-7
- Michael Johnson, All honourable men: the social origins of war in Lebanon, Centre for Lebanese Studies, Oxford and London, Oxford University and I.B. Tauris, 2001. ISBN 978-1860647154, 1860647154
- Michael Maschek, Myrtom House Building – un Quartier de Beyrouth en Guerre Civile (Recit), Éditions L'Harmattan, Paris 2018. ISBN 978-2343160016 (in French)
- Paul Jureidini, R. D. McLaurin, and James Price, Military operations in selected Lebanese built-up areas, 1975–1978, Aberdeen, MD: U.S. Army Human Engineering Laboratory, Aberdeen Proving Ground, Technical Memorandum 11-79, June 1979.
- Rex Brynen, Sanctuary and Survival: the PLO in Lebanon, Boulder: Westview Press, Oxford 1990. ISBN 0861871235 – Sanctuary and Survival: The PLO in Lebanon
- Robert Fisk, Pity the Nation: Lebanon at War, London: Oxford University Press (3rd ed. 2001). ISBN 0-19-280130-9
- Samir Kassir, La Guerre du Liban: De la dissension nationale au conflit régional, Éditions Karthala/CERMOC, Paris 1994. ISBN 978-2865374991 (in French)
- Thomas Collelo (ed.), Lebanon: a country study, Library of Congress, Federal Research Division, Headquarters, Department of the Army (DA Pam 550-24), Washington D.C., December 1987 (Third edition 1989). –

=== Further reading ===
- Frank Stoakes, The Super Vigilantes: the Lebanese Kata'eb Party as Builder, Surrogate, and Defender of the State, Middle East Studies 11, 3 (October 1975): 215236.
- John P. Entelis, Pluralism and party transformation in Lebanon: Al-Kata'ib, 1936–1970, E. J. Brill, Leiden 1974. ISBN 978-9004039117
- Leila Haoui Zod, William Haoui, temoin et martyr, Mémoire DEA, Faculté d'Histoire, Université Saint Esprit, Kaslik, Liban 2004. (in French)
- Marie-Christine Aulas, The Socio-Ideological Development of the Maronite Community: The Emergence of the Phalanges and Lebanese Forces, Arab Studies Quarterly 7, 4 (Fall 1985): pp. 1–27.
