= Bikfaya =

Bikfaya بكفيا
- Town
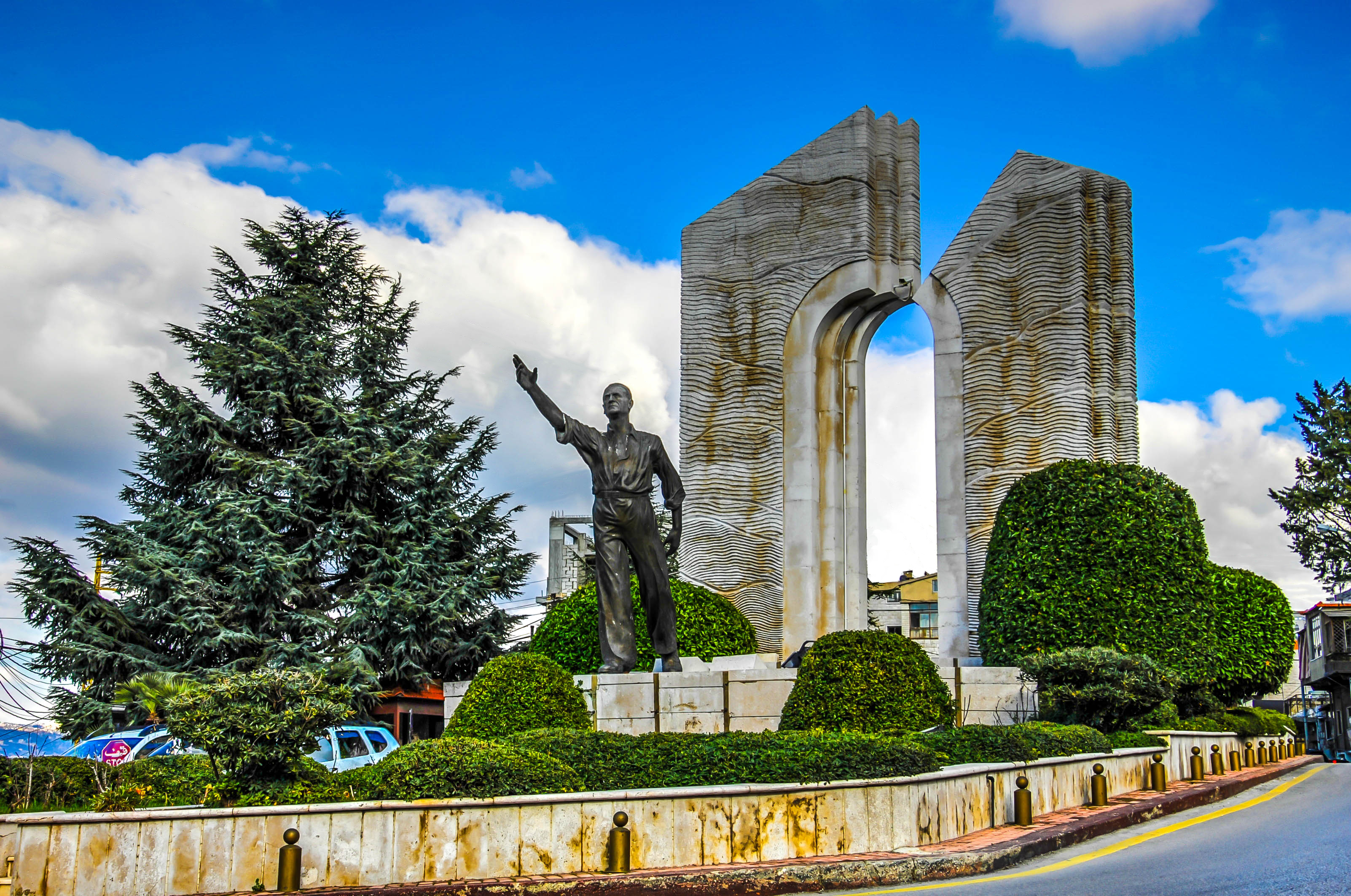
- Pierre Gemayel Memorial

- Location within Lebanon
- Coordinates: 33°55′N 35°41′E
- Country: Lebanon
- Governorate: Mount Lebanon Governorate
- District: Matn District
- Highest elevation: 1,000 m (3,300 ft)
- Lowest elevation: 900 m (3,000 ft)
- Time zone: UTC+2 (EET)
  - Summer (DST): UTC+3 (EEST)
- Dialing code: +961

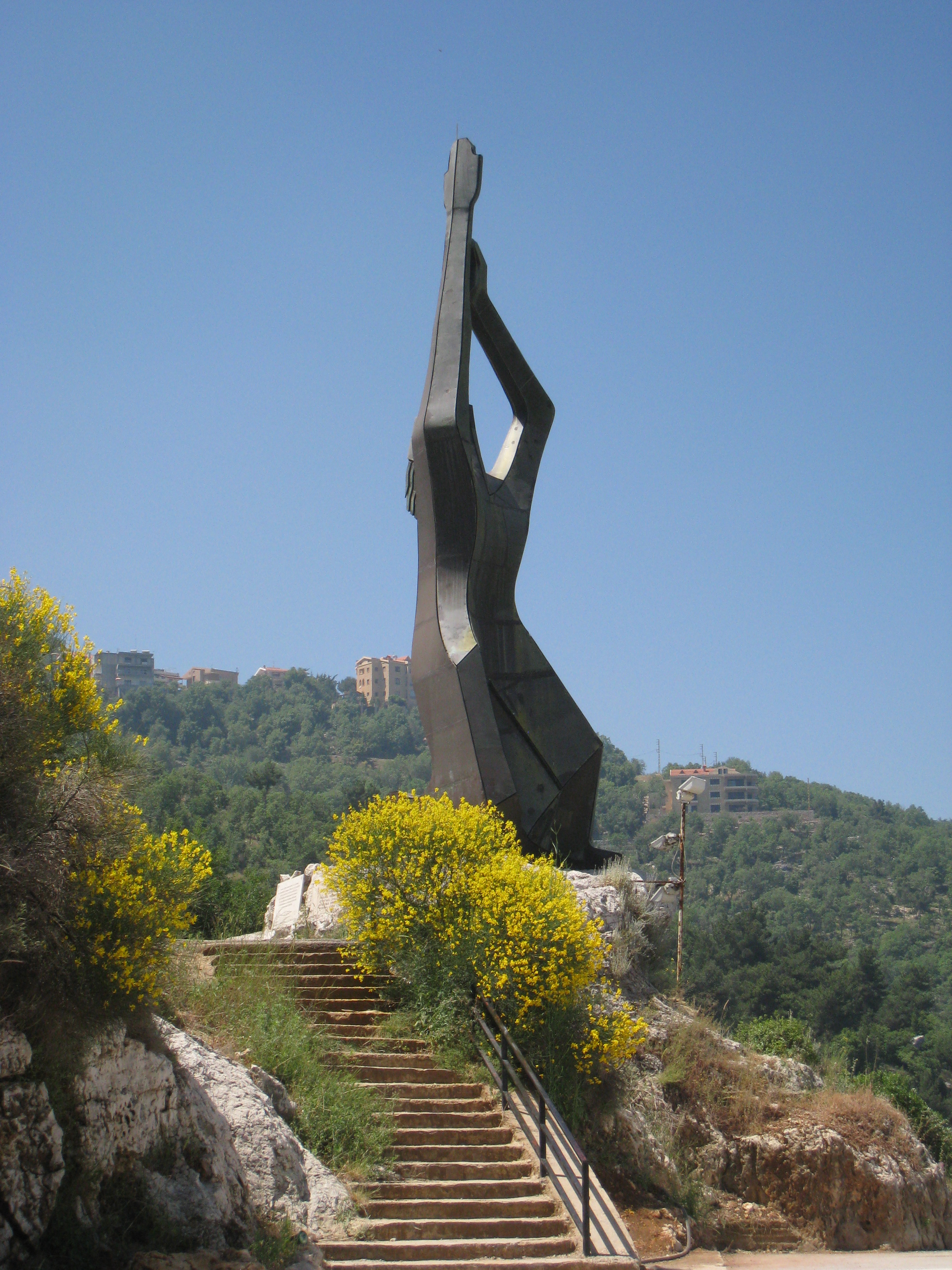
The Armenian Genocide memorial in Bikfaya

Bikfaya (Arabic: بكفيا, also spelled Bickfaya, Beckfayya, or Bekfaya) is a town in the Matn District region of Mount Lebanon. Its stone houses with red-tiled roofs resting amidst pine and oak forests make Bikfaya one of the most sought-after suburbs of Beirut and one of Lebanon's most popular summer resorts. An old town, among its monuments is the church of Mar Abda, built in 1587.

== Etymology ==
The name Bikfaya is a contraction of the Aramaic (Syriac) compound phrase "Beit Keifayya", ܒܝܬ ܟܐܦܝܐ, with "Keifayya" being the relative adjective of the word ܟܐܦܐ, meaning "rock" or "stone" in Aramaic. And so, Bikfaya would mean the "house of stone" or "the rocky/stony house" with the semantic connotation of "the place, location of stones, or stone quarry."

== Geography ==
Bikfaya is nestled in the mountains overlooking the Mediterranean with an elevation ranging from 900 to 1000 meters above sea level. It lies 25 km from Beirut and only a short drive to the Mzaar-Kfardebian ski resort and Zaarour Club. Summers in Bikfaya are cool and characterized by periods of fog in the afternoon.

The Greater Bikfaya consists of the towns of Bikfaya بكفيا, Mhaydseh المحيدثة, Sakiyat al Mesek ساقية المسك, Bhersaf بحرصاف, Aïn el Kharroubé عين الخرّوبة and Al Aayroun العيرون.

== History ==
The name of the town comes from Phoenician origin (Beit Kfeya) the stone house – that is consecrated to worship the God "Kifa".

Church historian, the German historian Roehinger, proved that the Christian peoples — later known as al-Marada — have lived in this area and built BasKinta, Bikfaya, and Bhersaf starting around the year 679, a short time before building Ehden in north Lebanon. Historians mention as well that Bikfaya and Bhersaf were the headquarters of the Maronite Emirs and Bishops starting from the 7th Century AD and the most distinguished of these was Emir Semaan who resided in Bhersaf in the 11th century.

The residents of the old Keserwan (which included at the time the Metn area and its surroundings) supported the Crusaders who remained in Lebanon from 1099 to 1291.

When the Crusaders withdrew from their last strongholds, the Mamlukes led their first campaign in revenge under the leadership of prince Pedra in 1292 against the citizens of Keserwan who were diverse early on, forming pockets of Shia Muslims and Maronites. However, the harsh mountains proved resistant to Mamluk soldiers who led a second campaign in 1293 which ended in the death of their leader and the slaughter of most of their soldiers.

In retaliation, the Mamluk gathered an army of fifty thousand warriors and attacked Kesrwan in 1305. They destroyed villages, burned temples, cut trees and wiped out all traces of construction and killing everyone they could find. Only a few of the residents survived the onslaught and fled to the mountains of North Lebanon. As such, Bikfaya and its surroundings remained uninhabited until the 16th century.

=== Bikfaya during the era of the Assafiyeen Emirs ===
Feudalism in the Mamluk era was granted by the sultan in return for military services provided by individuals to the state.

The Mamluk granted the Turkuman (known as Assafiyeen) control over the north (Lubnan Fi al-Tarikh- Dr Philip Hitty- Dar al –Thakafa- Beirut, 1959) with the mission to safeguard the shoreline against intrusion by occidentals and early natives. The Assafiyeen inhabited areas they called after their notables and then moved to Ghazir.

During the era of prince Mansour al-Assafy, with security spreading in the Kesrwan area, some members of the Bikfaya families—who had survived in 1305—started to return to their hometown in 1540 (Sheikh Edmond Bleybel) such as the Gemayels who came from Jaj in 1545 and were delegated control over Bikfaya and its northern suburbs.

In 1587 father Antoun Gemayel sought to build a church in Bikfaya, so he donated one thousand Kobrosy to this cause. However, this sum was not enough and the number of inhabitants of Bikfaya was little, so father Antoun resorted to his brother-in-law and nephew for help and unified the efforts of the two towns and implemented his project next to an old oak tree. The tree is estimated to be around 1000 years old, and its trunk is still visible.

Antoun set in the south-eastern side of the church an altar in the name of Mar Abda for the Maronites and another in the north-eastern side in the name of Our Lady for the Greek Orthodox (Bleybel).

Dweihy says in his book: the history of the Maronites page 181 :...and in the year 1587 (996H) father Antoun of Gemayel family built the church of Mar Abda in the village of Bikfaya and had it illustrated by Elias al-Hasrouny. He spent on it 1000 Kobrosy in addition to donations by the residents of Bikfaya and other philanthropists... then Patriarch Sarkis followed in the steps of his predecessors and raised father Antoun to Archbishop as a reward for his efforts.

Historians believe that Bikfaya was the consecrated shrine of the Phoenician deity Baal. It was also the capital of the Christian Cancimat of Lebanon (1840–1860).

Towards the end of March 1986, following the rejection by the Maronite Lebanese Forces (LF) of a peace plan, brokered by the Syrians, aimed at ending the Civil War, Christian areas were subject to indiscriminate bombardment by the Syrian Army. Bikfaya, the hometown of then President Amine Gemayel, was extensively damaged and most of its inhabitants left their homes. The shelling was condemned by the Shia leader Sheikh Fadlallah and Amal took no part in the fighting.

== Culture ==
La Fête des Fleurs à Beckfayya or the Festival of Flowers has attracted tourists since 1934 when Maurice Gemayel started the festival to attract attention to the mountainous town. Each year, a variety of vehicles decorated with thousands of colorful flowers and fruits parade through Bikfaya's tree-lined main street. Live music bands, bazaars, and the election of three beauty queens: the Queen of Flowers, the Queen of Fruits and the Queen of Sports, are held in the public squares and gardens.

== Demography ==
Bikfaya is home to 20,000 Lebanese who are mostly Christians, predominantly Maronite Catholic followers, with a significant minority of Greek Orthodox, Greek Catholic, Armenian Orthodox, Baptist and other Christians followers. Bikfaya is also the summer seat of the Armenian Catholicos of Cilicia. Gemayel is the name of a prominent Lebanese Maronite Christian family based in Bikfaya.

== Religious Structures ==
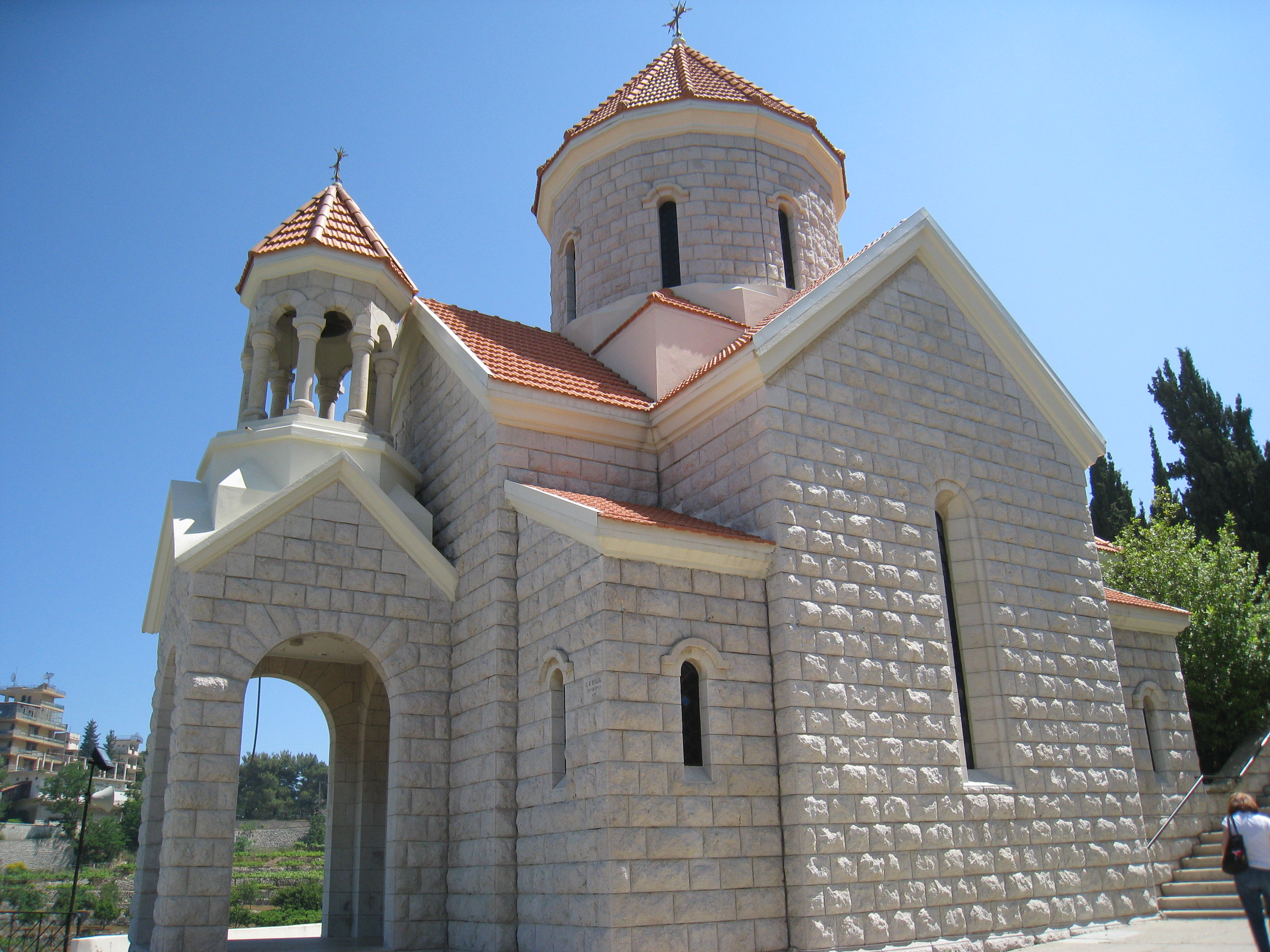
The Holy Mother of God Church in the Armenian monastic complex

- Mar Abda Church, built in 1587
- Jesuit Convent, built in 1833
- Saint Elias Chwayya Monastery, a Maronite and Greek Orthodox complex with a church, built in 1590
- Armenian seminary and summer retreat of the Catholicos of Cilicia
- Our Lady of Deliverance
- Mar Mkheyel (Saint Michael) Church
- Step 1, 2 and 3 Devotional Running Segments

== Tourism ==
Many restaurants, especially ones specializing in Lebanese cuisine, can be found in Bikfaya. It also offers tourists rest and leisure in its numerous hotels, amusement centers, and public gardens, such as the Grand Hotel Naas and such as Locanda Corsini guest villa. The Naas is a natural spring and one of Bikfaya's most popular destinations. The Naas has been known for its curative powers attracting hundreds of health-seeking tourists each year.

- Saj Hannoun (Atyab Manakish)
- Chaîne de Lumière, sculpture of a chain representing unity by Cedric Koukjian and Pierre Koukjian

== Notable residents ==
- Samy Gemayel (born 1980), Lebanese politician, son of Amine Gemayel and brother of Pierre Amine Gemayel
