= Nazar Najarian =

Lebanese businessman and politician (1957–2020)

Nazar Najarian نزار نَجَاريَان
- Died: 4 August 2020; Beirut
- Education: Haigazian University
- Occupations: Politician, businessman
- Political party: Kataeb Party

Nazar Najarian (Arabic: نزار نَجَاريَان; Armenian: Նազար Նաճարեան; circa 24 July 1957 – 4 August 2020), also known as Nazo (Arabic: نازو), was a Lebanese businessman and politician of Armenian descent who served as secretary-general of Lebanon's Kataeb Party, a Christian political party, from 11 June 2018 until his death on 4 August 2020.

== Biography ==
Najarian was the eldest sibling in an Armenian family of five. He became involved in Lebanese politics at the onset of the Lebanese Civil War in 1975.

In 1980, Bachir Gemayel had commissioned Nazar with the mission of "mobilizing individuals". He also undertook several missions during the Bachir Gemayel era, and especially during the Lebanese Civil War.

He moved to Qatar and stayed there until October 2012, after which he went to Montreal, completely distancing himself from politics. He was CEO at Tetran Holding Inc.

Najarian was killed on 4 August 2020, aged 63, after a series of explosions at the Port of Beirut, sent debris across the city. He suffered head trauma and succumbed to his injuries. He was buried on 8 August 2020.
