= Pierre Koukjian =

Pierre Koukjian (born 1962 in Beirut) is an artist based in Geneva, Switzerland. His life work focuses mainly on contemporary art and watch design. His work can be found at the Musée de l'Horlogerie in Geneva. His contemporary art ranges from oil on canvas to metal stainless steel sculptures and have been denoted as postmodernist by critics.

== Watchmaking ==
Pierre Koukjian has pioneered many advancements in the Swiss watchmaking industry. He later added to his creations various world premiere creations such as the double repeater and inlaying a tobacco leaf in the dial of a watch.

== Contemporary art ==
Pierre Koukjian's work in art were born from a need to explore new materials and way of expressing oneself on an art medium. He is mostly known for his critiques of Lebanese society with his neon piece "Electricity ON, Electricity OFF". A recent polemic in the contemporary art world has put Pierre Koukjian as the eye witness of the destruction of a painting during a Sotheby's auction where the artist said "a turning point in the history of contemporary and conceptual art". The timing, nature of his work, and enthusiasm about the whole situation has led to suspicions of Koukjian being in fact the original Banksy.

== Awards and notable works ==
Pierre Koukjian has won multiple awards for his work, amongst them the Tokyo "Unique design" award and the second best design in the Grand Prix d'Horlogerie in Geneva, 2003.

The sculpture "Haricot magique" is a public work exhibited at the roundabout of Cologny in Geneva, Switzerland.

The watch "Bichrono" is exhibited at the museum Musée d'art et d'histoire in Geneva, Switzerland.

The artist's recent work "Mass grave" depicting a used condom made of blown glass was chosen by the Princess Stéphanie of Monaco to be part of the auction "Fight aids Monaco" where the proceedings would go to help the fight against HIV/AIDS.
