= Maurice Gemayel =

Lebanese politician

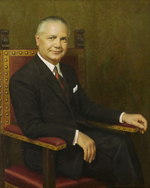
Maurice Gemayel

Maurice Gemayel (Arabic: موريس الجميل; Lebanon, 1910 — October 31, 1970) was a Lebanese politician who served several times as minister and MP for the Metn. He was also a prominent figure for the Kataeb Party which was founded by his cousin and brother-in-law, Pierre Gemayel.

His positions were more moderate than many other members of his own party. He was elected head of the Food and Agriculture Organisation for two consecutive terms. Highly educated, he was a genius and was considered by many to have been born 50 years too soon. Author of many books and studies, he created the Ministry of Plan in Lebanon. The Byblos Institute of Man was just one of his many projects. He died October 31, 1970, 60 years old, leaving behind seven daughters. His nephew, Amine, a future Lebanese president, succeeded him as representative of the Metn constituency. With the death of Maurice Gemayel, Lebanon lost one of its most prominent figures, a man of vision and reflection. Among his many projects was the creation of the Institute for Palestine Studies (1963), and of the Council of the South (1970).

== See also ==
- Gemayel
