= Pierre Amine Gemayel =

Lebanese politician (1972–2006)

- بيار أمين الجميّل
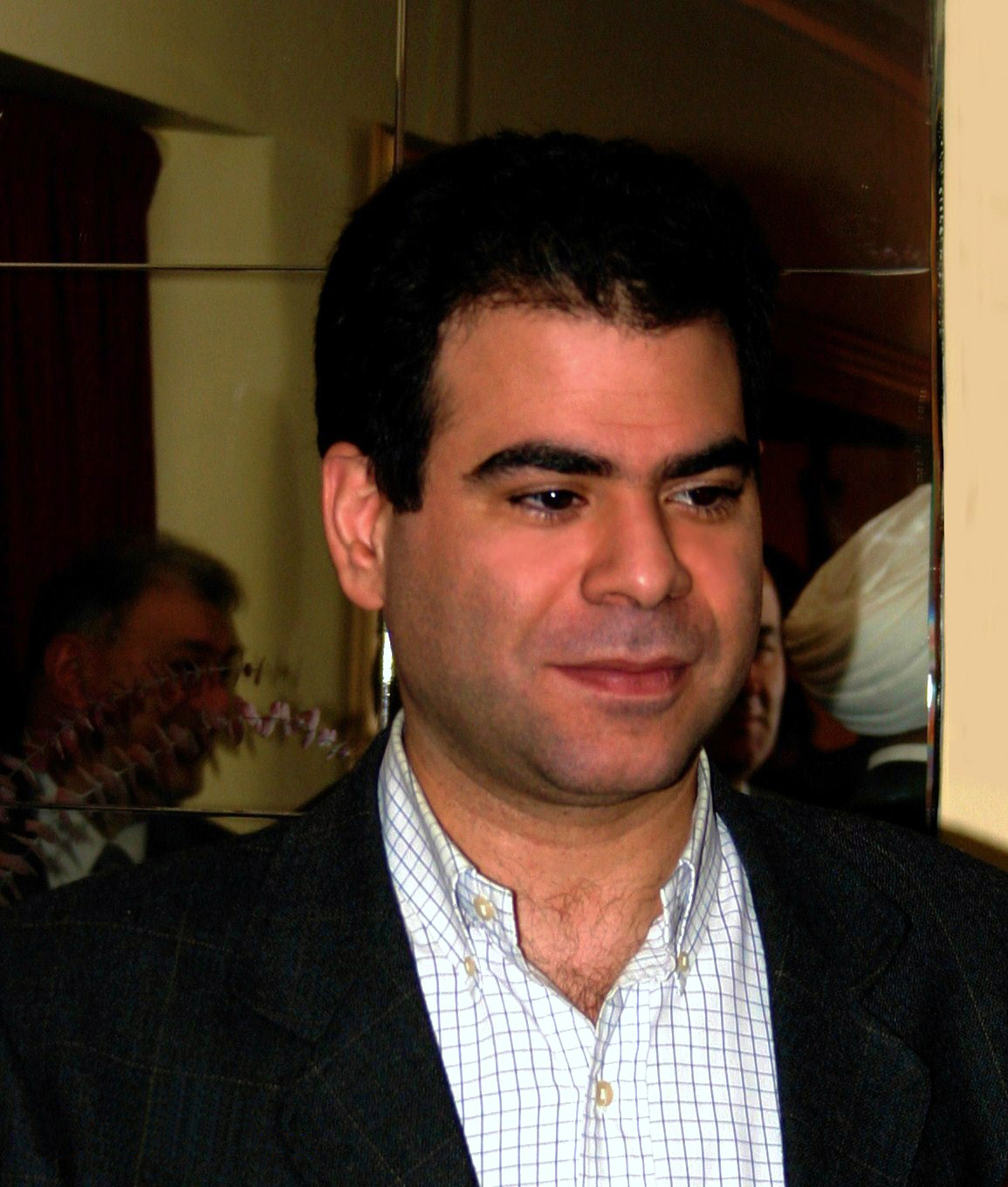
- Born: 23 September 1972; Beirut, Lebanon
- Died: 21 November 2006 (aged 34); Beirut, Lebanon
- Cause of death: Assassination
- Resting place: Bikfaya (family grave)
- Other names: Peter al Gemayel; Cheikh Pierre
- Occupation: Lawyer
- Political party: Kataeb Party
- Spouse: Patricia Daif
- Children: 2
- Parent(s): Amine Gemayel; Joyce Tyan
- Relatives: Bachir Gemayel (uncle); Samy Gemayel (younger brother); Pierre Gemayel (grandfather)

Pierre Amine Gemayel (Arabic: بيار أمين الجميّل; commonly known as Pierre Gemayel Jr., or simply Pierre Gemayel; 23 September 1972 – 21 November 2006) was a Lebanese politician in the Kataeb Party, also known as the Phalange Party in English.

== Early life and education ==
Pierre Amine Gemayel was born in Beirut on 24 September 1972 to a Maronite Christian family that has long been involved in Lebanese politics. Gemayel was the eldest son of former President Amine Gemayel and grandson of Pierre Gemayel, founder of the Kataeb Party. He was also the nephew of former president-elect Bachir Gemayel, who was assassinated in Beirut in 1982.

Gemayel studied law in Beirut and Paris, and began his legal career at a firm in Beirut. A short while later he took over the legal practice of his father.

== Political career ==
Gemayel started his political life in the year 2000, when he was elected to Parliament in the Matn District as an independent. An active member of the Kataeb movement (an offshoot of the Kataeb Party), he rejoined his father in the Qornet Shehwan Gathering. He was re-elected in 2005. On the other hand, he was the only member of the Alliance list of 14 March to win a parliamentary seat in the Metn district.

He was well known for his opposition to Syrian occupation and influence in Lebanon. He was against the mandate ruling of President Émile Lahoud, and took part in the Cedar Revolution after the assassination of former Prime Minister Rafik Hariri. In July 2005, he was named minister of industry in Fouad Siniora's government. He served as the representative of the Phalange party in the Siniora government.

== Assassination ==
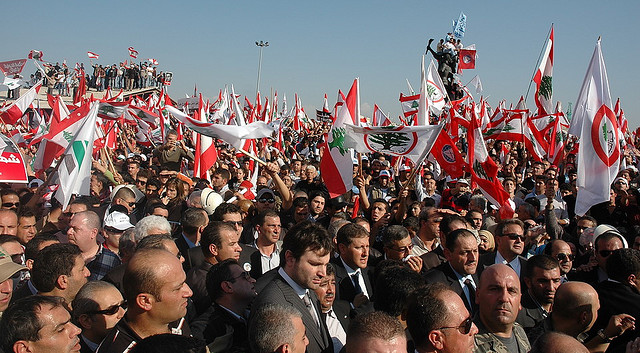
Supporters gather at Gemayel's funeral

On 21 November 2006, the day before Lebanese Independence Day, at least three to four people opened fire at close range on Gemayel with five different types of suppressed automatic weapons after ramming his car from the front in the Jdeideh suburb north of Beirut with a Honda CRV. Gemayel was the fifth prominent anti-Syrian figure to be killed in Lebanon in two years.

Gemayel was visiting his electoral district of Metn, in Jdeideh that day. The method by which Gemayel was assassinated is much more brazen than that used in the past: gunmen killing in broad daylight, rather than anonymous car bombs detonated remotely. He was rushed by his driver, who escaped the attack unhurt, to St Joseph's Hospital, where he was declared dead. His bodyguard, Sameer Chartouni, was also killed in the attack.

=== Perpetrators ===
His killers issued a communique in which they referred to themselves as the Fighters for the Unity and Liberty of Greater Syria. They said that they killed Gemayel because he was "one of those who unceasingly spouted their venom against Syria and against Hezbollah, shamelessly and without any trepidation". Those allegations could point the fingers at the Syrian Social Nationalist Party that has a long history of political assassinations in Lebanon.

A report by Kuwaiti newspaper Al-Seyassah alleged that an editor from the state-run Syrian Arab News Agency contacted a Lebanese pro-Syrian newspaper 55 minutes prior to the assassination to inquire about the murder. The story claims the SANA reporter called back 10 minutes later to apologize for the original call. Al Seyassah further states it did not name the Lebanese newspaper to protect its identity.

Lebanese law requires the dissolution of the government if one third of the 24-member Cabinet resign or become unavailable. It has been speculated that Gemayel's assassination was an attempt by pro-Syrian groups to reach the required third, and so force the current Government from power. With the recent resignation of six Hezbollah MPs from the Cabinet, added to Gemayel's death, the resignation or death of only two more ministers would topple the government. Others from the close circle of Pierre Gemayel would speculate that his fast political ascension had bothered many local powers mainly Syria's regime allies.

Others have, however, put forward many conspiracy theories regarding the murder such as a possible false flag operation. Many have questioned Syria's interest in targeting the Christian society as that could have the effect of destabilising a rival Christian party, namely Michel Aoun's Free Patriotic Movement which, together with Hassan Nasrallah's Shia Group Hezbollah, forms the largest parliamentary pro-Syrian block. However the pro-Syrian coalition managed to establish a sit-in, later growing into a protest camp, in the martyr's square downtown Beirut, to insist on their demands.

Despite these claims, the unidentified perpetrators are still at large and the investigation on the attack has been inconclusive.

== Funeral ==
A funeral ceremony for him was held on Martyrs' Square on 23 November 2006 with the participation of hundreds of thousands of supporters of the 14 March Alliance, and turned to be a political character. In Martyrs' Square, 800,000 men, women, and children gathered, waving Lebanese flags in red, white, and green, alongside posters of Pierre Gemayel. His body was buried in his hometown Bikfaya after Patriarch Nasrallah Sfeir performed the rites in Beirut.

=== Lebanese reaction ===
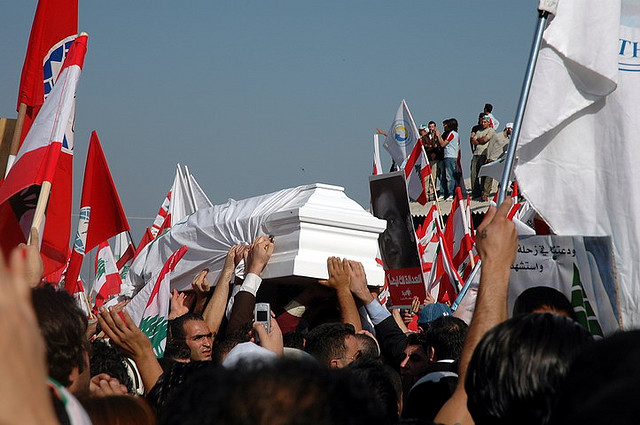
Gemayel's coffin making its way through the crowds

Saad Hariri, then majority leader of the Lebanese Parliament and the head of the Current for the Future political movement, accused Syria of ordering the killing. The Syrian government denied any involvement, and condemned the killings.

Lebanese Druze leader Walid Jumblatt also blamed Syria for the assassination, and said he expected more such killings aimed at undermining the Lebanese parliament's ruling majority. "I bluntly accuse the Syrian regime", Jumblatt said.

Samir Geagea, the leader of The Lebanese Forces, one of the major Christian parties, demanded President Émile Lahoud resign, and also accused Syria of ordering the killing. Michel Aoun, leader of The Free Patriotic Movement, strongly condemned the murder, and argued that it was aimed at generating chaos and uncertainty, primarily among the Christian society in Lebanon. Similar remarks and condemnation were issued by almost all of the major Lebanese political players.

=== World reaction ===
The UN Security Council condemned Gemayel's assassination.

Pope Benedict XVI's representative at the funeral condemned the "unspeakable" assassination.

British Prime Minister Tony Blair condemned the murder. Margaret Beckett, Secretary of State for Foreign and Commonwealth Affairs in the United Kingdom, called the killing "contrary to the interests of all in the region" in a press conference aired on Al Jazeera English approximately an hour after Gemayel's death was confirmed.

The US government condemned the murder. The US ambassador to the UN, John R. Bolton, said "One pattern we discern in these political assassinations of Lebanese leaders – journalists, members of parliament – they are all anti-Syrian. So I suppose one can draw conclusions from that," he said.

== Personal life ==
Gemayel married Patricia Daif, a Lebanese Christian, in 1999, and they had two sons.

== See also ==
- List of assassinated Lebanese politicians
