= Samy Gemayel =

President of the Lebanese Kataeb Party

- سامي الجميّل
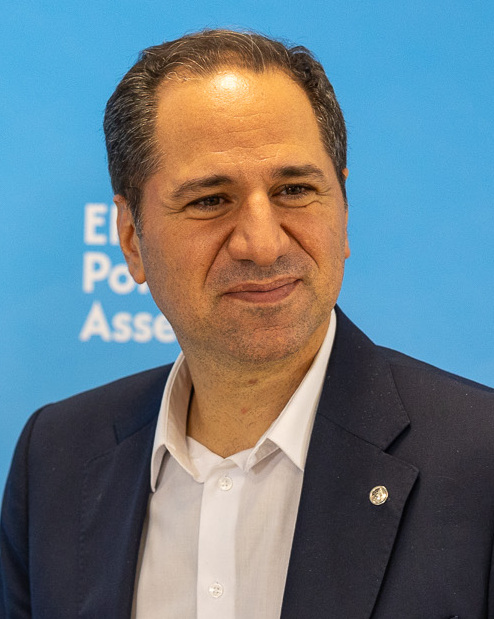
- Gemayel at the EPP political assembly in 2024
- Born: 3 December 1980 (age 45); Bikfaya, Lebanon
- Education: Université Saint Joseph de Beyrouth (AB, MA)
- Title: 7th President of the Lebanese Kataeb Party (Kataeb Party)
- Political party: Kataeb Party
- Parent(s): Amine Gemayel; Joyce Tyan Gemayel
- Relatives: Bachir Gemayel (uncle); Pierre Gemayel (grandfather); Nadim Gemayel (cousin)
- Website: samygemayel.com

Samy Amine Gemayel (Arabic: سامي الجميّل, born 3 December 1980) is a Lebanese politician, lawyer and a member of the Lebanese parliament. Being elected as party president in 2015, he presently serves as the seventh leader of the Lebanese Kataeb Party which was founded by his grandfather, Pierre Gemayel. He is a critic of the Free Patriotic Movement and Hezbollah. In his youth, he took part in pro-independence protest movements against the pro-Syrian political parties. He has called for the implementation of UN resolution 1559 in Lebanon.

== Early life and education ==
Gemayel was born into a prominent Maronite Catholic family in Lebanon on 3 December 1980. He is the son of former Lebanese President and former Kataeb Party President Amine Gemayel and his wife Joyce Gemayel. His older brother, Pierre, was a Member of Parliament and the Minister of Industry until his assassination on 21 November 2006. His grandfather, Pierre Gemayel, founded the Kataeb Party in 1936. Gemayel is also the nephew of the assassinated former President-elect Bachir Gemayel. assassinated on 14 September 1982, 20 days after his election as president of the republic.

In 2016, Gemayel married Karine Tadmori in Bikfaya. They have two daughters, Joyce and Kamy, and are currently expecting a third child.

Gemayel holds a B.A. in law (2003) and a M.A. in public law (2005) from the Saint Joseph University in Beirut. He also holds two certificates in leadership training from Harvard University.

== Political activism ==
In 1999, Gemayel was influential in establishing what was then known as the "Kataeb Base"– a platform of students peacefully fighting to end Syria's occupation of Lebanon. In 2003, he joined the Kataeb's Reform Movement that opposed the then pro-Syrian mainstream parties. Gemayel participated and led several demonstrations and peaceful sit-ins during that period, often being beaten and arrested with other pro-independence demonstrators. Shortly after the withdrawal of Syrian troops in April 2005, Gemayel co-founded with a number of political activists, 12-"Alliance Loubnanouna (Our Lebanon) a workgroup, advocating scholarly research and informed debate on a federal/decentralized political system for Lebanon. Separate from the Kataeb Party. Gemayel's movement aimed at reuniting the politically divided Lebanese Christians. He is an outspoken critic of both Hezbollah's military wing, as well as the Michel Aoun-led Free Patriotic Movement, and the main Christian party in opposition to March 14 Movement. In a 2006 interview following the 2006 Lebanon War, Gemayel accused Hezbollah of wanting "to implement an Islamic state in Lebanon," also adding that "Hezbollah is functioning as [its own] state: political power, economical power, social allegiance, military power, a region where it imposes its laws... all the attributes of a state." He expressed his hope that Lebanese Christians would reunite under similar political stances, and stressed that the Phalange is open to all Christians.

After the assassination of his brother Pierre Amine Gemayel in November 2006, Gemayel re-joined the Kataeb Party to head the party's Youth and Student Council. In 2008, he was appointed as coordinator of the Kataeb's Central Committee.

In June 2015, he was elected as Leader of the Kataeb Party, and was re-elected in February 2019, during the 31st party congress.

== Political career ==
Early in 2009, the Phalange (Kataeb Party) announced that it struck a deal with Michel Murr for a political alliance in the Matn District in the Lebanese parliamentary elections that were to be held in June. They declared that Samy Gemayel would run for a seat in parliament as one of two Phalangists hoping to represent the Matn District of Lebanon, the other being Elie Karami. On 3 April 2009, Sami officially announced his candidacy and again stated that "Christian unity is the only solution" to Lebanon's problems.

After his nomination in February 2009, Samy had constantly stressed the importance of all Lebanese voting in the upcoming elections. On 21 February, he stated that the Christian voters would make the difference in a choice between "Lebanon, the country of Resistance and the main state to be affected by the Arab–Israeli conflict or Lebanon, the non-aligned and democratic country." Gemayel has also stated that the Phalange would not make any agreement or reconcile with the Free Patriotic Movement as long as the latter continued to stand in support of Hezbollah bearing arms.

In 2009, Gemayel was elected into parliament. Member of three Parliamentary committees: Human Rights; Education and Culture; as well as Security and Local Governance. He presented several draft laws related to local governance and decentralization, neutrality of Lebanon, women rights, free education, and anti-corruption.

In addition to ensuring free textbooks for all students in public schools starting September 2012, Gemayel is primarily known for his success in abolishing honour crimes in Lebanon through a law proposal he presented before the Parliament in 2011. He also thrived in lobbying for and passing a law against domestic violence in 2014.

Gemayel took part in several panels at universities, schools, and various social clubs where he talked about the particular role of youth in political accountability, good governance, and political ethics. In addition, he has written several articles for local and international bulletins and newspapers on topics related to the permanent crisis in Lebanon, cultural pluralism, federalism and decentralization, collective memory and the foundations of genuine national reconciliation. In addition, Gemayel has represented Lebanon before the UN during panels dedicated to women's rights and participation in STME.

Following a long count, Gemayel was elected into parliament. Of seven seats possible to win in the Matn District, one went to Samy, one to ally Michel Murr, and the remaining to the Free Patriotic Movement led by Michel Aoun. Following the 2020 Beirut explosions, he stated that five members of the Kataeb Party will be resigning on 8 August 2020.

== Political views and actions ==
In May 2010, he criticized Hezbollah chief Hassan Nasrallah, asking him if he thought that all Lebanese who shared the Phalange's views were "Israeli agents." On 8 September 2010, he claimed that "he is not ashamed that his party dealt with Israel against Syria at a certain stage." Samy insisted that given the situation in which they were facing both PLO militiamen and Syrian troops, the Phalange had no choice but to accept aid from Israel. At the same time, he stated that any Lebanese foreign collaboration that took place since the end of the civil war in 1990 is not justifiable and that those who did collaborate should be considered traitors and foreign agents.

In December 2009, he expressed hope that Lebanon would play a positive, neutral role in the Israeli–Palestinian conflict, as long as neither side attacked Lebanon. Gemayel also said that Lebanese–Syrian relations could only be "perfect" once Syria releases the Lebanese detainees in their prisons and settles its border disputes with Lebanon.

In 2015–2016, Gemayel strongly opposed a settlement among most of the prominent Lebanese parties which allowed Hezbollah to put its hand on the Lebanese decision making.

Gemayel is currently the de facto leader of the opposition in Lebanon. He joined the opposition in 2016 after the resignation of the party's ministers from the cabinet presided over by PM Tamam Salam due to its mismanagement of the waste crisis and to corruption scandals implicating the ruling parties. He has also rejected the political concession in the same year which led to the election of President Michel Aoun into office – the main Christian ally of Iran-backed Hezbollah - and also refused to participate in the government due to the imbalance in favour of the Hezbollah-led March 8 camp. In the general elections in May 2018, Kataeb party joined forces with other opposition groups and formed lists in many districts.

On October 17, 2019, the Lebanese people took to the streets and protested against corruption, economic collapse, and clientelism. Gemayel and the Kataeb Party joined and supported the uprising, calling for the resignation of the government and for early parliamentary elections.

In August 2020, and 4 days after the devastating Beirut Port Explosion that caused at least 204 deaths, 7,500 injuries, and US$15 billion in property damage, and leaving an estimated 300,000 people homeless, Gemayel announced the resignation of the party's three MPs from Parliament during the funeral service of Kataeb Party Secretary-General Nazar Najarian, who died as a result of his injuries from the explosion.

In July 2024, he criticized Hezbollah for starting a war with Israel, saying: "Hezbollah’s calculations are not in Lebanon's interest as the group considers Iran's influence and the resistance coalition more important." He added that "The southern front did not affect at all" the course of the war in Gaza."

In July 2024, he called for the implementation of UN resolution 1559 which he said better serves Lebanon, in contrast he said UN resolution 1701 serves Israeli interests.

In December 2024, he made an interview and stated that Hezbollah lost its power and right to be called a resistance movement, once it took part in supporting the Syrian government. In addition, he said that Hezbollah is an Iranian tool sacrificing Lebanon's future for the sake of Iran's interests.
