= Karim Pakradouni =

Lebanese attorney and politician

- Born: 18 August 1944 (age 82); Beirut
- Education: Saint Joseph University
- Occupations: Politician and attorney
- Years active: 1968–present
- Spouse: Mona al Nashif

Karim Pakradouni (Arabic: كريم بقرادوني Armenian: Քերիմ Բագրատունի) (born 18 August 1944) is a Lebanese attorney and politician of Armenian origin. He was influential in Kataeb Party, heading it for some period. He was also influential in the Lebanese Forces in various critical phases of the LF. He was also minister of state in Rafic Hariri's government in 2004.

== Early life and education ==
Pakradouni was born in the Armenian district of Beirut, Bourj Hammoud, on 18 August 1944 to an Armenian Apostolic father Minas Pakradounian and Maronite Catholic mother, Lour Shallita from Qartaba. His father, Minas Pakradounian, left the Ottoman Empire in 1920 and settled in Aleppo, Ottoman Syria. Several years later, he moved to Lebanon where he married Shallita. Pakradouni has no familial ties to the traditional political elite in Lebanon.

Pakradouni received his secondary education at Collège Notre Dame de Jamhour in the suburbs east of Beirut in the Baabda district. He became politically active as a teenager, joining the Christian nationalist Kataeb Party (Phalange party) in 1959. He continued his education at the Lebanese French Saint Joseph University (Université de St. Joseph / USJ), studying law, history and political science, and graduated in 1968.

== Political career ==
Pakradouni has been a leading figure in the Kataeb Party since 1968 when he was elected president of the party's student organization. Salem Abdelnour who was his spouse's uncle provided him with the financial security to forgo a career and concentrate on his political aspirations. True to his Arabist tendencies, he developed close ties with the PLO and famously led a Kataeb student delegation to Jordan to meet with Yasser Arafat in 1969.

He was elected to the Kataeb party's political bureau in 1970 and remained in the party's top echelon, leading the so-called "Arabist" faction of the Kataeb Party (Phalange), which favored close ties with Syria. During the reign of Lebanese President Elias Sarkis in the 1970s, he was assigned as political advisor to the president.

Pakradouni was also a leading figure in the Lebanese Forces. After Bachir Gemayel tried to unite Christian military forces under the title of the Lebanese Forces, Pakradouni joined in. He was also part of the consultative team of Gemayel entrusted with the presidency's pan-Arab relations when Gemayel was elected President of the Republic. Gemayel was assassinated prior to his inauguration as president.

Pakradouni remained an influential figure during the Lebanese Forces head Elie Hobeika's reign after many revolted against the earlier chief of the LF Fouad Abou Nader and excluded Abou Nader from power. However, in a later internal feud in the Lebanese Forces led by Samir Geagea to remove Hobeika from power, Pakradouni squarely sided with Geagea against Hobeika who escaped to Syrian-controlled area.

In 1994, after the pro-Syrian Lebanese government ordered the dissolution of the LF and arrest of Samir Geagea on 21 April 1994, Pakradouni was sidelined and later on returned to the Kataeb Party.

On 4 October 2001, he was elected president of the Kataeb party, in a bid to unite the party divided between various factions prior to his ascendancy to the top position in the party. However throughout his tenure during the Syrian occupation of Lebanon, pro-Syrian party members were promoted and anti-Syrian members were intimidated or ejected. In 2004, he was appointed minister of state for administrative development to the cabinet led by Rafic Hariri.

Until December 2007, he was the hands-on leader of the Kataeb party, while former Lebanese president Amin Gemayel was the "higher leader." Pakradouni resigned from office in 2007 and in February 2008, Gemayel became the sole leader.

== Personal life ==
In 1968, Pakradouni married Mona al Nashif, the niece of former member of the Lebanese Parliament, businesswoman and philanthropist Salem Abdelnour. He has two sons: Jihad, who is a current MP, and Jawad.
