= Amine Gemayel =

President of Lebanon from 1982 to 1988

Amine Gemayel OM ONC
- أمين الجميٌل
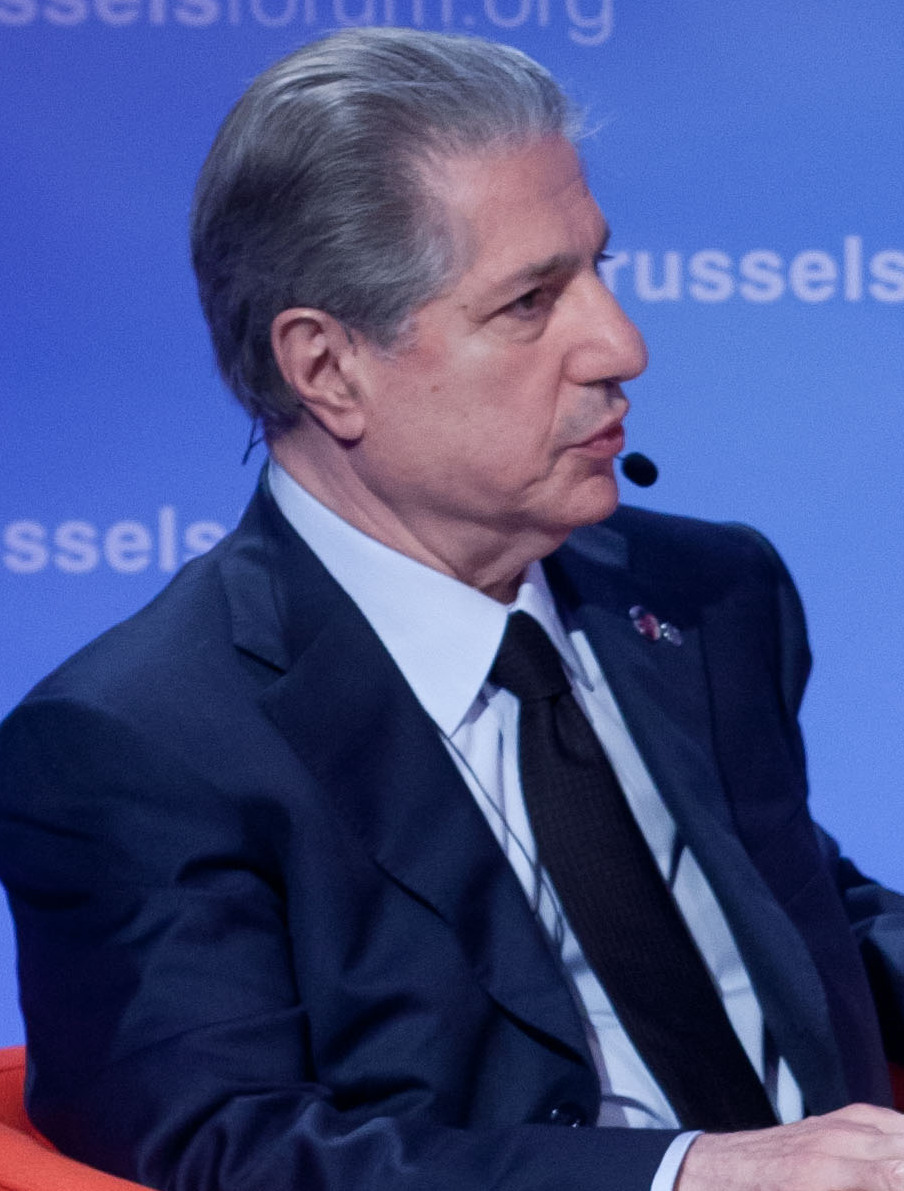
- Gemayel in 2012

8th President of Lebanon
- In office 23 September 1982 – 22 September 1988
- Prime Minister: Shafik Wazzan; Rashid Karami; Selim Hoss; Michel Aoun
- Preceded by: Élias Sarkis; Bachir Gemayel (elected)
- Succeeded by: Michel Aoun (disputed); Selim Hoss (acting); René Moawad

Personal details
- Born: 22 January 1942 (age 84) Bikfaya, Greater Lebanon
- Party: Kataeb Party
- Spouse: Joyce Tyan (m. 1967)
- Children: 3, including; Pierre; Samy
- Parents: Pierre Gemayel (father); Geneviève Gemayel (mother)
- Education: St. Joseph University
- Religion: Maronite Catholicism
- Website: www.aminegemayel.org

Amine Pierre Gemayel (Arabic: أمين بيار الجميّل, Lebanese Arabic pronunciation: [ʔæmiːn ɪlʒmaj.jɪl]; born 22 January 1942) is a Lebanese politician who served as the eighth president of Lebanon from 1982 to 1988.

Gemayel was born in Bikfaya to Pierre Gemayel, the founder of the Christian Kataeb Party (also known as the "Phalanges"). He worked as a lawyer, then was elected as a deputy for Northern Metn in 1970 by-election, following the death of his uncle, Maurice Gemayel, and once again in the 1972 general election. At the start of the Lebanese Civil War, the Phalanges were a member of the Lebanese Front, allied with Syria against the leftist National Movement. However, Syria became their enemy, while they started receiving the support of Israel. This phase saw the rise of Amine's brother, Bachir, who had disputes with Amine about the military leadership, such as uniting the Christian militias by force. In 1982 Bachir was elected to presidency but was assassinated before taking office.

Gemayel's election was endorsed by the United States and Israel following the assassination of his brother, and he was elected on 23 September 1982. At the age of 40 years, Amine was the youngest president to take office. Gemayel re-organized the Lebanese Army, receiving support from the Multinational Force in Lebanon and despite fierce internal opposition, he reached the May 17 Agreement with Israel in 1983, which stipulated the withdrawal of the Israeli forces and ending the state of war between the two countries, but didn't ratify it. Under his command, the army, allied with the Lebanese Forces, clashed with Jammoul, a Syrian-backed alliance led by the Druze Walid Jumblatt, in what is known as the Mountain War. By the end of the conflict, the government suffered heavy defeat, and lost control over wide areas of Mount Lebanon. It was followed by the February 6 Intifada, where the army was expelled out of West Beirut, and disintegrated into sectarian groups.

As a result of heavy pressure, and the withdrawal of the multinational forces, Gemayel visited Damascus in 1984, and formed a national unity government, including members from the opposition, headed by Rashid Karami. He cancelled the May 17 Agreement, and appointed Michel Aoun as a Commander of the Armed Forces. In 1986, he helped Samir Geagea organize a coup against the leader of the Lebanese Forces Elie Hobeika, for signing the Tripartite Accord with Berri and Jumblatt. Following the assassination of Karami, he appointed Selim Hoss as acting Prime Minister. Right before his term expired, Gemayel dismissed the cabinet and formed a military government headed by Michel Aoun. Aoun then declared war on Syria but was defeated in 1990, marking the end of the civil war and the implementation of the Taef Agreement. Gemayel moved to Switzerland and later France, starting a self-imposed exile.

In 2000, Gemayel returned to Lebanon, and organized opposition to Syria, and the leadership of the Phalangist Party. He joined the Qornet Shehwan Gathering, and participated in the Cedar Revolution following the assassination of Rafic Hariri. In 2006, Pierre Gemayel, his son, who was a member of the parliament, was assassinated. He ran in the by-election, but lost against a Free Patriotic candidate. His other son, Samy, succeeded him as president of the Phalangist Party.

== Early life and education ==
Gemayel descends from a Maronite Christian family (the Gemayels) with a long tradition in Lebanon. The Gemayel family are originally from the northern region of Mount Lebanon. His ancestors settled in the town of Bikfayya, 25 kilometers northeast of Beirut, in the mid-16th century. Born in the Lebanese town of Bikfaya on 22 January 1942, Amine Gemayel is the eldest son of Pierre Gemayel, founder of the Kataeb Party and his wife Genevieve. He has two sisters and a brother, late Bachir Gemayel. His grandfather was forced to leave Lebanon in the early 20th century as a result of his opposition to the Ottoman Empire and therefore, had to spend several years living in Egypt. Gemayel's great uncle, Antoine, traveled to the Paris Peace Conference in 1919 as a political representative of the Maronite Christian community in Lebanon.

Gemayel obtained a law degree from the St. Joseph University in Beirut in 1965.

== Career ==
Amine Gemayel began his career after his graduation practicing as an attorney in 1965. He then concentrated on building up his family's newspaper business. In a 1970 by-election, he was elected to succeed his deceased uncle, Maurice Gemayel, as a member of the National Assembly; he defeated Fuad Lahoud by a margin of 54% to 41%. In 1972, in the last election to be held for 20 years, he was reelected by a large margin.

While his younger brother Bashir was regarded as a political radical, espousing the expulsion of Palestinian guerrillas from Lebanese soil and a radical overhaul of the political system, and hinting at a possible peace settlement with Israel, Amine Gemayel was considered more moderate. Always a consensus politician, he avoided, at least in his pre-presidential years, alienating Muslim politicians as his brother had done. When Bashir Gemayel was assassinated by a member of the Syrian Social Nationalist Party, therefore, Amine was regarded as a natural choice to bring together both the supporters of his slain brother, and his Muslim opponents.

On 21 September 1982, he was elected the president of the republic. His term in office ended on 22 September 1988 (six years as per the Lebanese Constitution). He then joined the Center for International Affairs at Harvard University as a fellow and lecturer (1988–1989). He is affiliated with the University of Maryland as a distinguished visiting professor. From 1990 to 30 July 2000, he resided in Paris as an exiled leader of the opposition, and lectured extensively on Lebanon and the Middle East in various countries worldwide. Since July 2000, he has been living in Lebanon where he pursues his political agenda.

== Presidency ==
Gemayel never promised the Israelis anything in order to be elected president, but he promised that he would follow the path of his brother Bashir whatever that path was. He left his post in the Kataeb Party after being elected president. Once elected, he refused to meet any Israeli official. With foreign armies occupying two-thirds of the country (Syria in the north and east, Israel in the south), and private armies independent of government control occupying most of the rest, Gemayel's government lacked any real power. His efforts to reach a peace settlement with Israel were stymied by Syria and by Muslim politicians at home. His government found itself largely unable to collect income tax, as warlords controlling the ports and major cities pocketed the tax take themselves. Many criticized Gemayel for not moving decisively enough to assert the authority of the government, but others have pointed out that with most of the country under foreign occupation, there was little that he could do. He managed to keep a semblance of constitutional order.

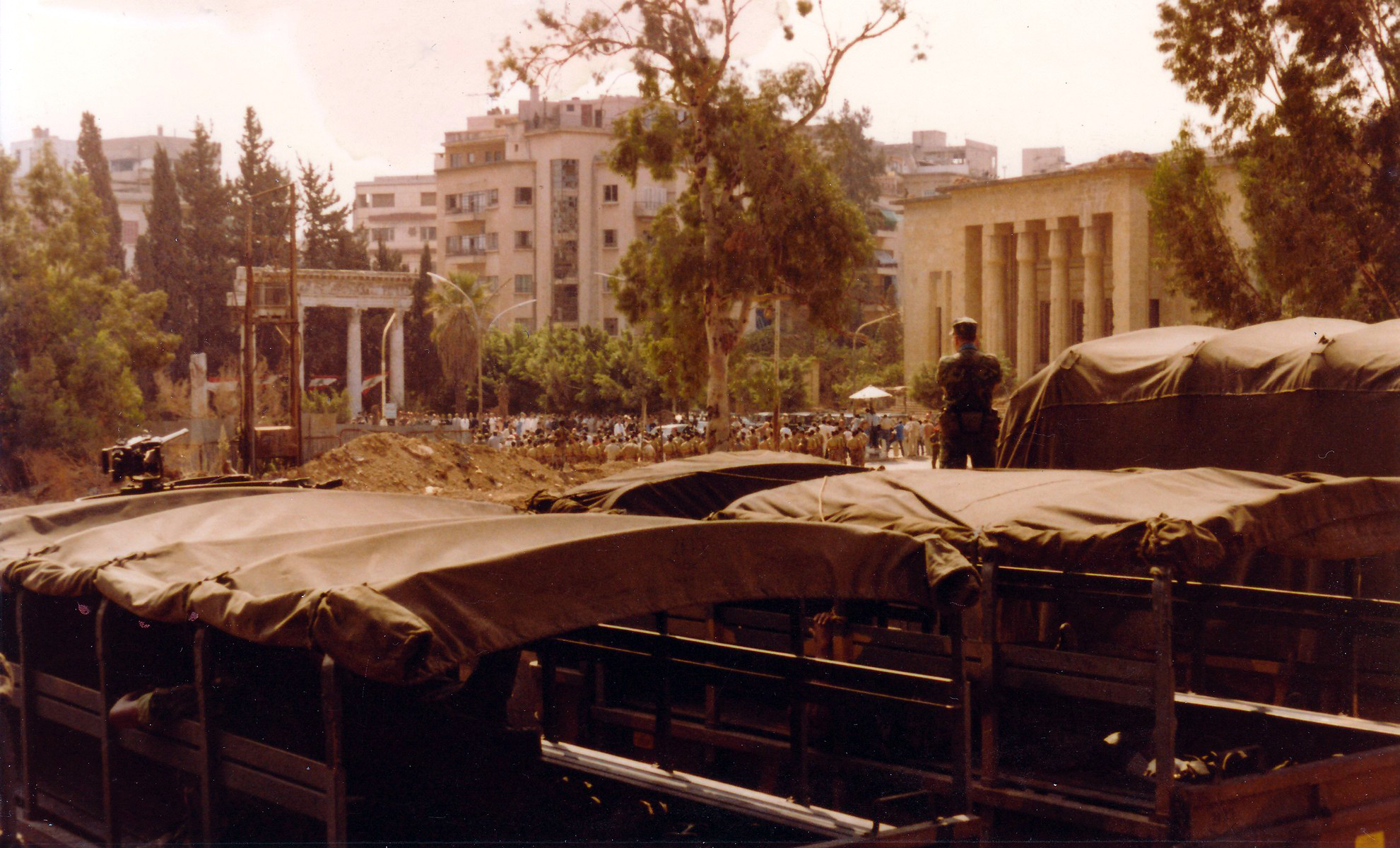
Amin Gemayel's Inauguration, Beirut 1982 seen from a US army post

This order began to unravel in 1988. Gemayel, whose term was due to end on 23 September, was constitutionally barred from reelection. Amine Gemayel opposed Dany Chamoun for the presidential elections, a man known for his strong anti-Syrian views and the son of former president Camille Chamoun, or General Michel Aoun, the commander of the army. Chamoun and Aoun were both unacceptable to Syria and to Muslim politicians in Lebanon. A constitutional crisis developed. Fifteen minutes before the expiry of his term, Gemayel appointed Aoun to the post of prime minister, who takes on the role of acting president if the presidency is vacant. He did so to preserve the tradition that the president, and by implication anyone acting in that role, should be a Maronite Christian, thereby going against the tradition of reserving the premiership for a Lebanese Sunni Muslim. Muslim politicians and warlords refused to accept the Aoun government, instead recognizing a rival government of Selim Hoss, whom Gemayel had dismissed in favour of Aoun.

When Amine Gemayel took office, Lebanon was torn by Israel's invasion of June 1982, and its subsequent occupation of large areas of Lebanese territory. This made the withdrawal of Israeli troops a top priority on his political agenda. As head of state, he set himself three main objectives which still form the basis of his political activity today: (1) Reestablishing the independence and sovereignty of Lebanon; (2) Maintaining an effective dialogue between Lebanon's different communities and (3) Restoring and modernizing the institutions of the state.

In 1984, Amine Gemayel dissolved the "Arab Deterrence Force", which provided the legal framework for Syria's military presence since 1976; and in 1985, he refused to ratify the so-called "Damascus Agreement" brokered by the Syrian government between the fending Lebanese chiefs of militias, which aimed at disintegrating any independent decision-making process in Lebanon.

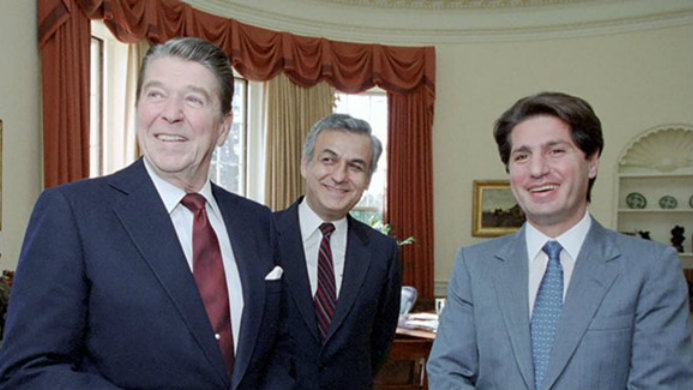
US president Reagan meets with Lebanese president Amine Gemayel in White house

In 1987, he promulgated the law annulling the "Cairo Agreement" of 1969, which authorized the PLO to use Lebanon as a base for military operations against Israel, disregarding Lebanese sovereignty.

=== The Puma scandal ===
Amine Gemayel was believed to be behind the purchase of what were supposed to be new, French-made Puma helicopters. That was in 1983. Then the aircraft were discovered to be used and Ukrainian-made, making them worth far less than original price (184 million francs, a rough equivalent of $80 million at the time). The deal was signed in Beirut in July of the year 1983 by Lebanese Defense Minister Issam Khoury and the “Société Francaise de Vente et Financement de Materiels Terrestres et Maritimes” (SOFRANTEM). Gemayel denied that he had any connection with the affair. According to the minutes of Parliament's session, published in the Official Gazette in 1994, Parliament held the French government responsible for the financial losses as a result of breaking the contract. Officials also held then Army Commander General Ibrahim Tannous responsible for “neglect” because an illegal military deal was sealed during his term of office. The minutes showed that Parliament also held Gemayel responsible, and that it referred the case to the state prosecutor for further investigation. This was all brought up in 2002 as part of investigations by a special parliamentary committee into former President Amin Gemayel's role in the Puma aircraft sale.

=== Other activities ===
Apart from his political activities, Amine Gemayel established, in 1976, the "INMA Foundation", which coordinates several institutions dealing with social, political and economic issues concerning Lebanon and the Middle East. He also founded "Beit-al-Mustakbal", (the house of the future), a think-tank and research center which published Haliyyat, a quarterly journal edited in Arabic, French and English, comprising a chronology of the main events in the area, press reports, and a series of essays. In addition, he started a French-language daily newspaper entitled Le Reveil.

== Post-presidential years ==
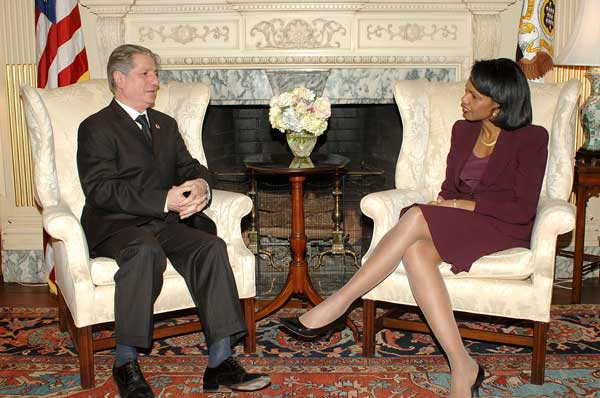
Amine Gemayel during a visit to US Secretary of State Condoleezza Rice in February 2007.

Gemayel started a self-imposed exile for the next twelve years, living variously in Switzerland, France, and the United States. At first, he claimed that he was threatened by Syria, but he later published in his memoirs that Geagea threatened him with personal harm.

In 1989, he joined Harvard University's Center for International Affairs. He also lectured at the University of Maryland, College Park. On 30 July 2000, however, he returned to Lebanon and began to organize the opposition to the government of President Émile Lahoud, whom he regarded as a Syrian puppet. Unable to regain control of the then pro-Syrian dominated official Kataeb Party, he founded a new party, al-Qaeda al-Kataebiya, which claimed to be the true successor to the old Kataeb Party founded by his father. He also joined the Qornet Chehwan Gathering, a group of anti-government Christian politicians.

In 2003, Amine Gemayel attempted to act as an intermediary between U.S. President George W. Bush and the Iraqi President Saddam Hussein. Although his efforts to forestall the ensuing Iraq War were not successful, they fuelled speculation that he might be a candidate for Secretary General of the United Nations when Kofi Annan's term expired.

After the Cedar Revolution the Kataeb factions were united under the leadership of Gemayel. After Gemayel's son Pierre was assassinated in November 2006, Amine ran for his late son's seat. Amine lost by a small margin to an unknown candidate presented by Michel Aoun as a member of the Free Patriotic Movement.

In February 2008, Gemayel was appointed the president of the Phalange or Kataeb Party, replacing Karim Pakradouni, who resigned from office in 2007.

== Personal life ==
Gemayel married Joyce Tyan in December 1967. They had a daughter, Nicole, and two sons, Pierre and Sami. Pierre Gemayel was elected to Parliament in 2000, appointed to the Cabinet in 2005. He was assassinated by unidentified assailants in Jdeideh, a Beirut suburb, on 21 November 2006. Amine Gemayel angrily blamed Syria for the murder of his son. He is fluent in French and English.

== Publications ==
- 1986: Peace and Unity (Colin and Smythe)
- 1988: L'Offense et le Pardon (Gallimard), reflections on the events in Lebanon.
- 1990: Méditations d'espoir (JC. Lattès), a series of lectures delivered in the United States in 1989.
- 1992: Rebuilding Lebanon's Future, published by Harvard University (C.F.I.A.).

Political offices
Preceded by Bachir Gemayel	President of Lebanon; 1982–1988	Succeeded by Selim Hoss; Acting
