= Assaad Chaftari =

Lebanese intelligence official

Assaad Chaftari أسعد الشفتري
- Born: 1955 (age 70–71)
- Occupations: Military Intelligence Official, Author
- Notable work: La vérité même si ma voix tremble (book)
- Political party: Kataeb, Lebanese Forces

Assaad Chaftari (also spelled Assad Shaftari, Arabic: أسعد شفتري) served as a senior intelligence officier of the Lebanese Christian militia Lebanese Forces during the Lebanese Civil War. Chaftari was a close associate of Elie Hobeika. He published a letter of apology to the Lebanese people in February 2000, in the national newspapers, for his war actions, he is now dedicated to promote personal change, peace building and reconciliation.

Chaftari was a subject in Eliane Raheb's 2012 documentary, Sleepless Nights.

Chaftari wrote a book titled "La vérité même si ma voix tremble" in French, translated to Arabic as " الحقيقة و لو بصوت يرتجف", in November 2015.

== Biography ==
Born in 1955, Chaftari grew up in a French-speaking home in Beirut’s Christian Gemmayze district.

In 1974, he joined the Kataeb Party while he was in his fourth-year as an engineering student, one year before the civil war started, when he received military training and helped to create the Kataeb's intelligence service.

While in his 20s, he rose in the party to become the deputy to Elie Hobeika. In 1985 He was one of the negotiators of negotiations which led to was called the Tripartite Agreement between the Christian Lebanese Forces, The PSP party of Jumblat and Amal of Berri under Syrians auspices.

In 1988 he participated in a meeting held by the Initiatives of Change movement. Although he had initially been suspecting a hidden agenda, the meeting initiated a deep change in him. Asked to look back over his life, he saw "a path full of blood".

He is currently an activist, member of movements and NGOs, including the coalition Wahdatouna khalasouna. and The Global Peace-builders Network. In 2012 during the clashes between the Sunni and Alawi communities in Tripoli, northern Lebanon he was one of 5 ex-fighters who organised a press conference addressing the new fighters and their politicians. They founded 2 years later an NGO called "Fighters for Peace". In 2019 he represented Fighters for peace in the founding of a Lebanese gathering called "Forum for Memory and Future".

== See also ==
- Bachir Gemayel
- Elie Hobeika
- Kataeb Regulatory Forces
- Massoud Achkar
- Jocelyne Khoueiry
- Joud El Bayeh
- Lebanese Civil War
- Lebanese Forces (militia)
- Sabra and Shatila massacre
