= Jocelyne Khoueiry =

Lebanese militant and activist (1955–2020)

- Born: 15 August 1955; Beirut, Lebanon
- Died: 31 July 2020 (aged 64); Jbeil, Lebanon
- Occupations: Militant; Activist
- Political party: Kataeb Party

Jocelyne Khoueiry (15 August 1955 – 31 July 2020) was a Lebanese female militant in the Kataeb Party and an activist during the Lebanese Civil War.

== Biography ==
A Maronite Catholic, Khoueiry was active in the Kataeb Party. During the Civil War, the Christian militia fought against the Palestinian fighters of the Palestine Liberation Organization.

On 7 May 1976, she defended a building overlooking Martyr's Square in Beirut alongside six other women against 300 Palestinian fighters. An image of Khoueiry received worldwide attention.

Khoueiry led up to 1,000 combatants under her orders. The number of women reached 1,500 in 1983. She laid down her arms in 1986.

In 1988, Lebanese filmmaker Jocelyne Saab made a film about Khoueiry. The film, broadcast on Canal+, was titled La Tueuse and reports on her passage of faith during the Lebanese Civil War.

She founded three associations: La Libanaise 31 mai, Oui à la Vie" and the Centre Jean-Paul II. In 2012, she participated in a synod on the Middle East. In 2014, she participated in the Third Extraordinary General Assembly of the Synod of Bishops and was appointed to the Pontifical Council for the Laity.

Jocelyne Khoueiry died in Jbeil on 31 July 2020 at the age of 64.

== See also ==
- Assaad Chaftari
- Bachir Gemayel
- Kataeb Regulatory Forces
- Lebanese Civil War
- Lebanese Forces (militia)
- Massoud Achkar
