= William Hawi =

Lebanese politician (1908–1976)

William Hawi وليم حاوي
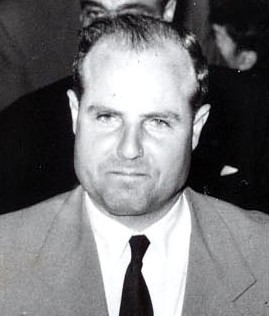

Former chief of the Kataeb Security Council
- Succeeded by: Bachir Gemayel

Personal details
- Born: September 5, 1908; New York City, United States
- Died: July 13, 1976 (aged 67); Tel al-Zaatar, Beirut, Lebanon
- Party: Kataeb Party

William Amine Hawi (also written: William Haoui, Arabic: وليم أمين حاوي; September 5, 1908 – July 13, 1976) was a Lebanese–American politician and rebel commander of the Kataeb Party, better known in English as the Phalange, a right-wing Christian political party in Lebanon.

He was Head of the second and Fourth Districts, President of the Recruitment Bureau, Head of the Department of Security, Sport and Mobilization on May 29, 1952, and member of the Political Bureau on July 12, 1952. On June 16, 1958, William Hawi was in charge of organizing and leading the activists during the Lebanese events; this constituted the hub of the Party's Regulatory Forces. On January 23, 1961, the Political Bureau dissolved the militants' organization before including its members in the Lebanese Phalange Party and Hawi created the Regulatory Forces. On February 6, 1961, William Hawi was appointed Head of said Forces. In 1963, the "First Commandos" unit was created. It was followed by the "Second Commandos" unit, then by the "B.G" troop. In 1973, the "Maghaweer" platoon was created and the "Combat School" established. Moreover, "Chef" William (which means "leader" in French), supervised the setting up of camps as well as the training organization and development, which enabled the progress of the regulatory process.

In 1952, the Lebanese Phalange put William Hawi up for the Beirut Municipal Council in the Achrafieh-Rmeil region, where he obtained the largest number of votes. In 1957, Hawi presented himself to the legislative elections but failed.

In 1975, Hawi was leading operations against the Palestinians fighting in Lebanon at the Souks of Beirut, Karantina, Jisr el Basha, Dekwaneh, Galerie Semaan and what is known as the "Battle of the Hotels".

On July 1, 1976, sources of the Kataeb Party announced the fall of the last bastion in Tel el-Zaatar and declared that the Head of the Phalange War Council supervised this operation.

On July 13, 1976, William Hawi was killed by a Palestinian sniper following this victory. Following his death, Bachir Gemayel was appointed his replacement as president of the Kataeb Military Council, which later became the core of the Lebanese Forces.

== Biography ==
=== Background ===
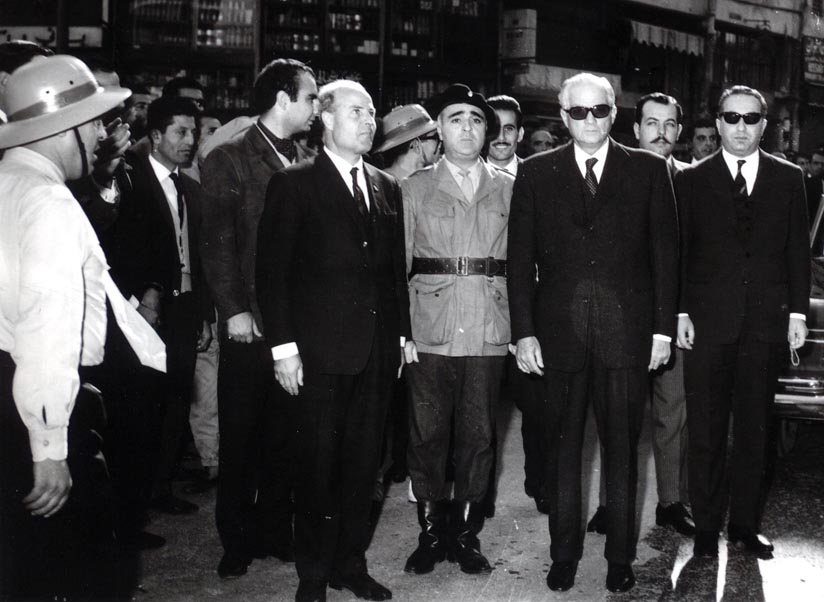
William Hawi welcoming President Camille Chamoun

William Hawi's family comes from the village of Choueir in North Metn, Lebanon. William's father, Amine Hawi, emigrated when he was twenty years old. His second son, William, was born in New York, U.S. in 1908. Before the family grew and spread its roots in the foreign land, Amine Hawi went back to his homeland in the beginning of 1910, along with his wife and three children. William Hawi had a passion for sports. He played football, tennis and loved swimming and skiing. His sports activities were topped by his participation in the creation of Al Salam Club in Achrafieh. William Hawi met Pierre Gemayel in sports meetings and the latter invited him in 1937 to join the Lebanese Phalange Organization.

In 1947, William Hawi married Marcelle Anis Ghobril. They lived in Beydoun quarter in Achrafieh and had a single daughter, Leila. Hawi was a Greek Orthodox Christian.

William Hawi owned a factory of mirrors, which exported its products to the Arab countries and became one of the most important factories in the Middle East before moving from Debbas Square to Jisr el Basha. With the Palestinian-Lebanese war in 1970, the region of Jisr el Basha fell under the control of the Palestinians living in the camps of Jisr el Basha and Tell el Zaatar and the factory became a primary target for destruction as revenge against its owner: William Hawi, leader of the Lebanese parties opposed to the Palestinian intervention in Lebanese affairs. The Palestinians broke into the factory, destroyed glass and machines before blowing up the facility.

=== Political role ===
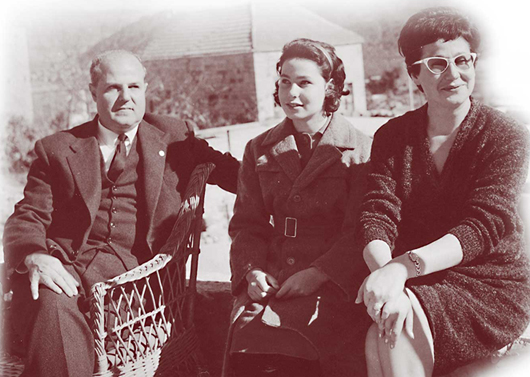
William Hawi with his family

William Hawi accepted Pierre Gemayel's invitation and joined the Phalange Organization in 1937 even when it was working secretly and illegally following a decree ordering its dissolution on November 18, 1938. He was involved in several issues: consolidating the Party's authority and creating and developing the Kataeb Regulatory Forces in an atmosphere of discipline. William Hawi's responsibilities increased and became diversified. He was appointed Head of the Second and Fourth Districts, President of the Recruitment Bureau in 1942, Head of the 'Department of Security, Sport and Mobilization' on May 29, 1952, and member of the Political Bureau on July 12, 1952. On June 16, 1958, he was in charge of organizing and leading the activists during the Lebanese events; this constituted the hub of the Party's Regulatory Forces, of which he became the leader on February 6, 1961.

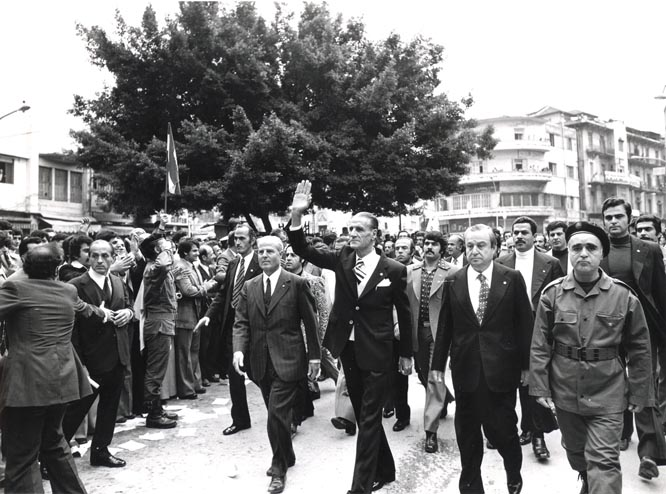
Celebrating the anniversary of the Kataeb in 1971 with Pierre Gemayel

The discussions about creating the Phalange Security wing featured several conflicting opinions and lasted interminably before the Party took its final decision to agree to the presence of Regulatory Forces. On January 23, 1961, the Political Bureau dissolved the militants' organization before including its members in the Lebanese Phalange Party and Hawi created the Kataeb Regulatory Forces. On February 6, 1961, William Hawi was appointed Head of said Forces. In 1963, the "First Commandos" unit was created. It was followed by the "Second Commandos" unit, then by the "P.G." troop. In 1973, the "Maghaweer" platoon was created and the "Combat School" established. Moreover, "Chef" William supervised the setting up of camps as well as the training organization and development.

=== National struggle ===
When the French took Pierre Gemayel prisoner, Joseph Chader took over the political command while William Hawi was in charge of the organized security effort. He prepared and organized the strikes and demonstrations. He held secret meetings with the Najjadeh Party ("the rescuers") at the mirror factory he owned in Debbas Square. When the French found out about these meetings, they raided the factory several times and pursued William Hawi who escaped by hiding at his friends and neighbors.

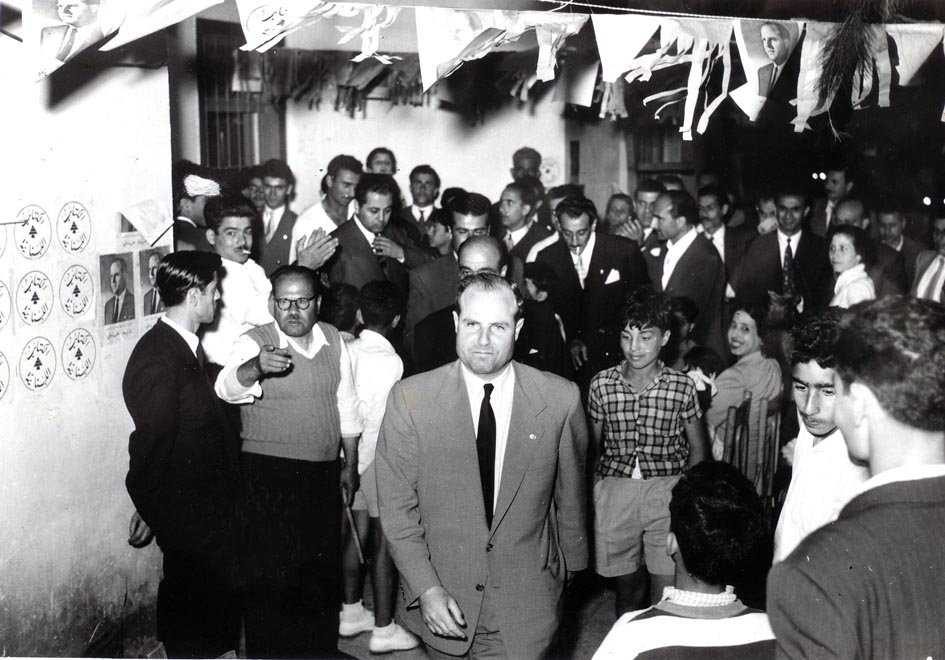
William Hawi during the Ashrafieh-Rmeil elections

In 1952, the Lebanese Phalange put William Hawi up for the Beirut Municipal Council in the Achrafieh-Rmeil region for the Eastern Orthodox Christian seat, where he obtained the largest number of votes. In 1957, he individually ran for the Parliamentary elections opposite Ghassan Tueini and Nassim Majdalani but did not win. Despite its loss, the Phalange Party considered these elections to be a confirmation of its strength on the streets.

==== Military decisions ====
===== 1958 Lebanon crisis =====
During this period, the Lebanese and Arab scenes were marked by the halo of the Egyptian President, Gamal Abdel Nasser. The Phalange Party was fiercely opposed to the pro-Nasser movement that called for strikes and organized riots. It thus entrusted William Hawi with organizing and leading the activists to control the situation and protect its regions.

====== Lebanese Civil War ======
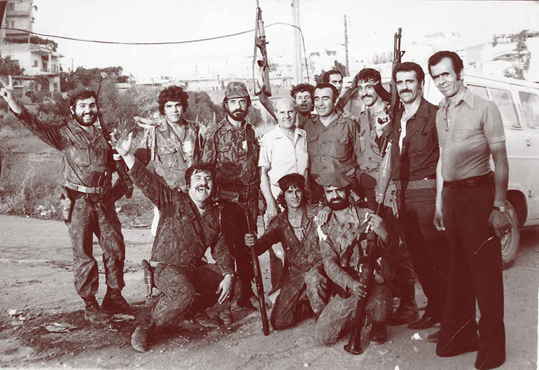
William Hawi at Tell El Zaatar

Events started escalating dramatically in favor of the Palestinians who started infiltrating the safe houses in the cities and villages, raising confusion and violating rights and properties. The Political Bureau held an extraordinary meeting on March 31, 1970, and created a "Higher Council" in charge of supervising the organization of the Party's work relating to its security and that of the country. William Hawi was entrusted with the security issues and requirements. While the political command of the Party was trying to establish peace and dialogue, the military command led by William Hawi was preparing the Regulatory Forces, manning its human and material capacities in order to fight against the settlement plan that had already started to emerge. The state being unable to fulfill its duties and defend its people, and the governmental institutions being disabled, it was necessary to unify and organize the ranks of the parties for defense purposes. William Hawi was worried by the lack of weapons, ammunitions and supplies and by the absence of coordination between the allied Lebanese forces at the front. He held several meetings with the allied forces in order to create a "Unified Operation Room", the first core of the "Lebanese Forces".

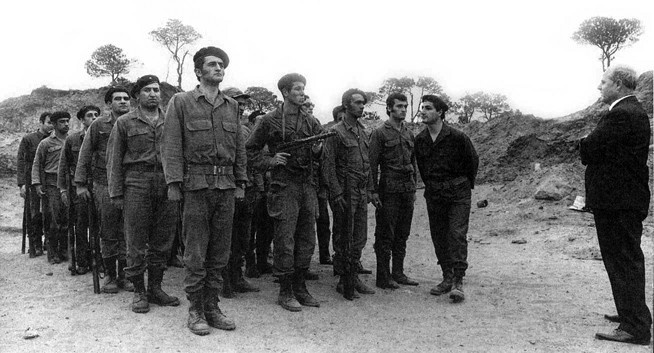
William Hawi and Bachir Gemayel inspecting the Kataeb troops

===== Fighting corruption =====
William Hawi created a "Military Police" in charge of controlling the disorder and chaos that were everywhere and introduced a regulatory mechanism to guarantee road safety and guide the citizens to these safe roads. Perhaps the most terrible ordeal he had to face was the infamous massacre on December 6, 1975, that was later called the "Black Saturday", in which Phalangist gunmen killed hundreds of Palestinians and Druze civilians. Hawi was also subjected to menaces and humiliation when he tried to rescue as many innocents as he could. Several persons owe him their lives, their dignity and their properties.

===== Liberation battles =====
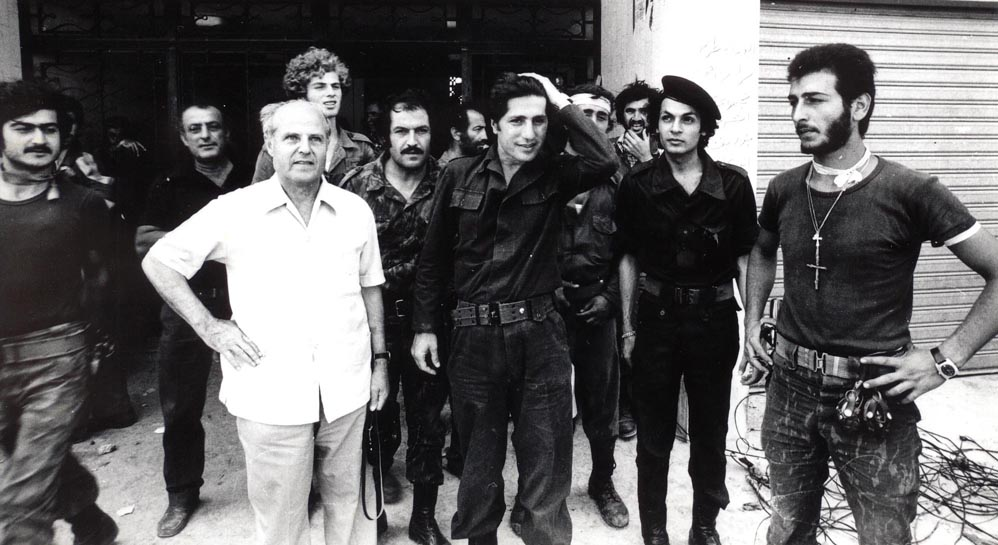
William Hawi at Tell el Zaatar with former President Amine Gemayel

William Hawi engaged in a fight against corruption and in a battle for liberation when the Palestinians tried to control Beirut completely by isolating it with their surrounding military camps. The Quarantine camp fell within 24 hours under the attack orchestrated by William Hawi, which opened the road linking Beirut to Kesserouan and Byblos in December 1976. The camp of Jisr el Basha also fell after two days of the blockade organized by "Chef" William, paving the way for the liberation of the camp of Tell el Zaatar. However, the camp fell one building after the other. On July 11, 1976, the sources of the Lebanese allied forces announced the fall of the last bastion in Tell el Zaatar and declared that the Head of the Phalange War Council supervised this operation. On July 13, 1976, William Hawi was killed in the middle of the battlefield, before having the opportunity to celebrate his victory.

=== Death ===
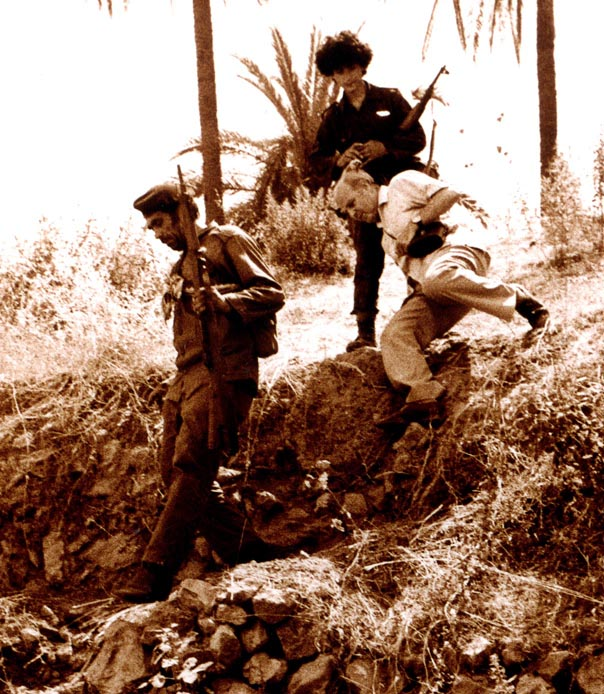
William Hawi at the front in Tell el Zaatar

On July 13, 1976, at the boundaries of Tel el Zaatar, between Al Raii El Saleh and Gallery Matta, a shot was fired by a sniper and killed Hawi while he inspected his forces at the forefront of the battlefield as witnessed by his comrades who were with him.

Upon the death of William Hawi, Bachir Gemayel was appointed his replacement as president of the Kataeb Military Council and as the head of the unified command of the Lebanese forces, a coalition of the Christian militias of the Kataeb Party (created and organized by Hawi), National Liberal Party, the Tanzim and the Guardians of the Cedars. On July 7, 1980, these Christian militias were unified into one as the Lebanese Forces with Bachir Gemayel as their Commander-in-Chief. Gemayel was elected as president on August 24, 1982, but he was assassinated on September 14, 1982, before the beginning of his term.

== See also ==
- Phoenicianism
- Lebanese Front
- Lebanese civil war
- Siege of Tel al-Zaatar
- Kataeb Party
- Kataeb Regulatory Forces
