= Massoud Achkar =

Lebanese politician (1956–2021)

Massoud "Poussy" Achkar (Arabic: مسعود "بوسي" الأشقر; 1956 – 11 January 2021) was a Lebanese independent politician and former militiaman. He was close to former president Bashir Gemayel, and later co-founded the Lebanese Forces.

== Biography ==
During the Lebanese Civil War, Achkar was known as "Poussy" and was in charge of military operations in Achrafieh between 1975 and 1986. Achkar founded "Unity for Lebanon" movement (الإتحاد من أجل لبنان) and was its secretary general. He took part in the 2009 and the 2018 Lebanese general elections to represent the Beirut constituency but without success.

Achkar was married to Greta Achkar and has four daughters. He died from COVID-19 in Beirut on 11 January 2021, during the COVID-19 pandemic in Lebanon.

== See also ==
- Assaad Chaftari
- Bachir Gemayel
- Ehden massacre
- Kataeb Regulatory Forces
- Jocelyne Khoueiry
- Joud El Bayeh
- Lebanese Civil War
- Lebanese Forces (militia)
