= Fanar, Lebanon =

Fanar الفنار
- City
- Location within Lebanon
- Coordinates: 33°52′N 35°34′E
- Country: Lebanon
- Governorate: Mount Lebanon Governorate
- District: Matn District

Government
  - Time Zone: GMT +2 (UTC)
  - - Summer (DST): +3 (UTC)
  - Area Code(s): (+961) 1

Area
  - Total: 2.10 km^{2} (0.81 sq mi)
- Elevation: 250 m (820 ft)
- Highest elevation: 250 m (820 ft)
- Lowest elevation: 200 m (660 ft)

Population
  - Total: 30 000
  - Density: 500/km^{2} (1,300/sq mi)
- Time zone: UTC+2 (EET)
  - Summer (DST): UTC+3 (EEST)
- Dialing code: +961

Fanar (Arabic: الفنار, romanized: al-Fanār) is a town in the Matn District of the Mount Lebanon Governorate in Lebanon. It is situated in the heart of Lebanon, 8 km from Beirut and was previously called “Achrafieh El Fawqa”. The town was known to have very few residents who were farmers and was almost entirely green until after the Lebanese civil war when many displaced families chose to move to the area.

== Civil war ==
During the civil war, 4 young Christian men of the Kataeb Party were assassinated in Fanar by Muslims in the area, which sparked the Black Saturday, a revenge act which caused the killing of hundreds of Muslim citizens across Lebanon.

== Etymology ==
Fanar is an Arabic word that means lantern (through Ancient Greek phanòs, φανός).

== Geography ==
Fanar is 8 km away from the capital Beirut lying at an elevation of approximately 250m above sea level.

== Demographics ==
As of 2008, Fanar houses a population of approximately 30 000 of whom 850 are registered voters. Its inhabitants are predominantly Maronite Catholic.

== Education ==
Higher education in Fanar is provided by a large number of schools and universities, such as Lebanese University (Faculty of Science and Faculty of Letters and Human Sciences), Al-Kafaàt University (AKU), Collège de la Sainte Famille Française Fanar, Institut Modèrne du Liban (IML), Collège Notre Dame du Mont Carmel des Sœurs Carmélites de Florence à Fanar, and Collège Saintes Hripsimiantz des Soeurs Arméniennes Catholiques de l'Immaculée Conception.
