= Kataeb Regulatory Forces =

Armed Wing of the Lebanese Christian Kataeb Party (1961-80)

Kataeb Regulatory Forces قوات الكتائب النظامية
- Kataeb Regulatory Forces flag (1961–1980)
- Leaders: William Hawi; Bachir Gemayel; Amine Gemayel
- Dates active: 1937–1961; 1961–1980
- Headquarters: Achrafieh, Karantina (Beirut), Bikfaya
- Active regions: East Beirut, Matn District, Mount Lebanon, Southern Lebanon
- Ideology: Lebanese nationalism Phalangism; Anti-communism; Anti-pan-Arabism; Anti-Palestinianism; Gemayelism; Maronite interests
- Political position: Right-wing to far-right
- Size: 15,000 fighters
- Part of: Kataeb Party; Lebanese Front; Lebanese Forces
- Wars: 1958 Lebanon crisis; Lebanese Civil War; Battle of the Hotels; Karantina massacre; Tel al-Zaatar massacre

The Kataeb Regulatory Forces – KRF (Arabic: قوات الكتائب النظامية, romanized: Quwwāt al-Katāʾib an-Niẓāmiyyah) or Forces Régulatoires des Kataeb (FRK) in French, were the military wing of the right-wing Lebanese Christian Kataeb Party, otherwise known as the 'Phalange', from 1961 to 1977. The Kataeb militia, which fought in the early years of the Lebanese Civil War, was the predecessor of the Lebanese Forces.

== Origins ==
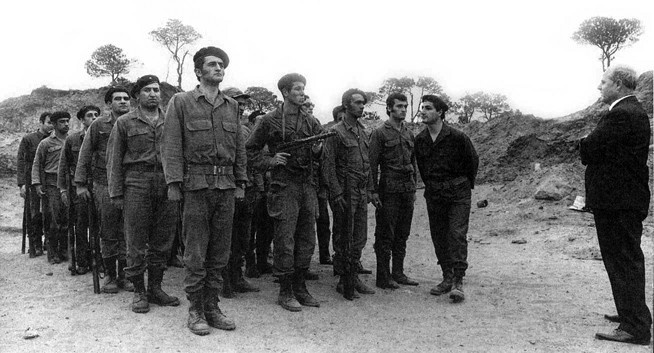
Bashir Gemayel and William Hawi supervising the training of Kataeb militiamen at Tabrieh, 1972.

Founded in 1937, the Kataeb Party's paramilitary wing was Lebanon's oldest continuous political party militia and entered the 1975 civil war as the largest and most formally structured force within the predominantly Maronite Christian camp. It was founded as the "Fighter's organization" (Arabic: تنظيم المقاتلين| Tanẓīm al-muqātilīn) by the President of the Party, the za'im (political boss) Pierre Gemayel and William Hawi, a Lebanese-American glass industrialist, who led them during the 1958 civil war. Fighting alongside the pro-government forces in support of President Camille Chamoun, the Phalangists defended the Matn District, a traditional Phalangist stronghold centered at the town of Bikfaya – the Gemayel family's feudal seat –, and kept the main roads connecting Beirut to that territory open, where the Gemayels held numerous commercial interests.

Disbanded in January 1961 by order of the Kataeb Party's Political Bureau, Hawi created in their place the Kataeb Regulatory Forces. In order to coordinate the activities of all Phalange paramilitary forces, the Political Bureau set up the Kataeb War Council (Arabic: Majliss al-Harbi) in 1970, with William Hawi being appointed as head. The seat of the council was allocated at the Kataeb Party's Headquarters at the heart of Achrafieh quarter in East Beirut and a quiet expansion of KRF units followed suit, complemented by the development of a training infrastructure. Two company-sized Special Forces units, the "1st Commando" and the "2nd Commando" were created in 1963, soon followed by the "Pierre Gemayel" (PG) squad (later a company) and a small VIP protection squad, "The Rock" (Arabic: Al-Sakhra). To this was added in 1973 another commando platoon (Arabic: Maghaweer) and a "Combat School" was secretly opened at Tabrieh in the Keserwan District, followed in 1975 by a second training camp, established at Amaz, near the village of Mayrouba, also located in the Keserwan. Another special unit, the "Bashir Gemayel brigade" – named after Pierre Gemayel's youngest son, Bashir – was formed in 1976, absorbing the old PG company in the process.

== Military structure and organization ==
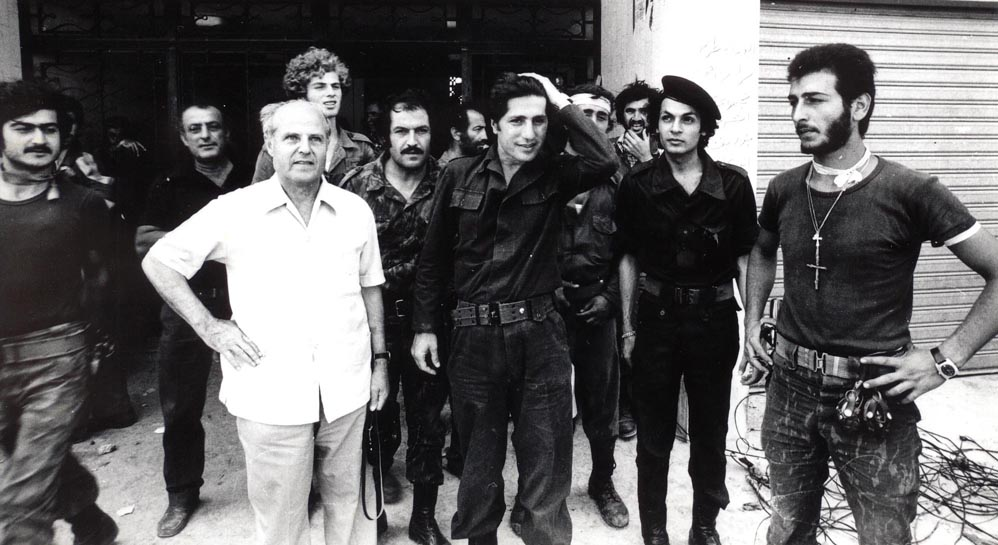
William Hawi with KRF junior commander Amine Gemayel at Tel al-Zaatar, 1976.

By April 1975 the Kataeb Regulatory Forces (KRF) were able to muster 5,000 militiamen, a total which included 2,000 full-time uniformed fighters backed by some 3,000 irregulars, originally armed with obsolete firearms. However, some sources place the total of RF fighters higher, around 8,000, organized into autonomous companies or battalions drawn from local Phalange party' sections (Arabic: qism). Each section was responsible for handling all defensive or offensive military operations on their home districts, except for the regular units (the "Commando", Maghaweer and PG companies), which were often deployed as mobile quick reaction forces. Although its membership and command structure was predominately Maronite, the KRF also included a few Greek-Catholics and Armenians in its ranks.

The KRF was re-organized and expanded in May 1975, and new specialized units were raised – a Signals battalion (Arabic: Silah al-Ishara), an armoured battalion (a.k.a. 2nd Armoured Battalion; Arabic: Silah al-Moudara'a) led by Joseph Elias, a battalion-sized women's section (Arabic: Nizamiyyat) led by Jocelyne Khoueiry, and an artillery group (Arabic: Silah al-Madfa'aiya) led by Antoine Bridi. To maintain law and order in the areas under Phalangist control at Beirut and elsewhere, in 1976 a 1,000-strong Police unit, the Kataeb Security Detachments or "Sections Kataeb de Securité" (SKS) in French was formed and commanded by Raymond Assayan. The Phalangists practiced conscription in the areas they controlled, drafting eligible young men to swell its ranks, and by January 1976 the KRF had increased to 10,000–15,000 men and women, this number including civilian recruits and deserters from the Lebanese Army. According to other sources, the KRF regular forces comprised more than 3,000 full-time uniformed fighters by mid-1978.

KRF militia units operated mainly in East Beirut, the Aley District, the Matn District, Mount Lebanon, the Koura and Keserwan Districts, but also had a presence at the south in the Jabal Amel, where their local militants – after merging with local Shia Muslim and Druze militias – played a key part in the formation on 21 October 1976 of the Israeli-backed informal "Army for the Defense of South Lebanon" or ADSL (French: Armée de Défense du Liban-Sud or ADLS), later to become known as the "Free Lebanese Army" (FLA), the predecessor of the South Lebanon Army (SLA).

After Hawi was killed in action at Tel al-Zaatar by a Palestinian sniper on 13 July 1976, he was replaced by Bashir Gemayel, the senior KRF Inspector since 1971 and future supremo of the Lebanese Forces. On August that year, he moved the Kataeb War Council from the Kataeb Party's offices in Achrafieh to his new Headquarters situated in an abandoned hospital at the Karantina neighborhood located east of the Port of Beirut.

== List of KRF Commanders ==
- William Hawi (1961–1976)
- Bashir Gemayel (1976–1980)

=== KRF junior commanders ===
- Amine Gemayel
- Antoine Bridi
- Boutros Khawand
- Elie Hobeika (a.k.a. 'HK')
- Elie Zayek
- Fadi Frem
- Fouad Abou Nader
- Jocelyne Khoueiry
- Joseph Elias
- Joseph Saadeh
- Massoud Achkar (a.k.a. 'Poussy' Achkar)
- Raymond Assayan
- Sami Khoueiry
- Samir Geagea (a.k.a. 'Hakim')

=== Other KRF personnel ===
- Dominique Borella
- Richard Millet

== Administrative organization and illegal activities ==
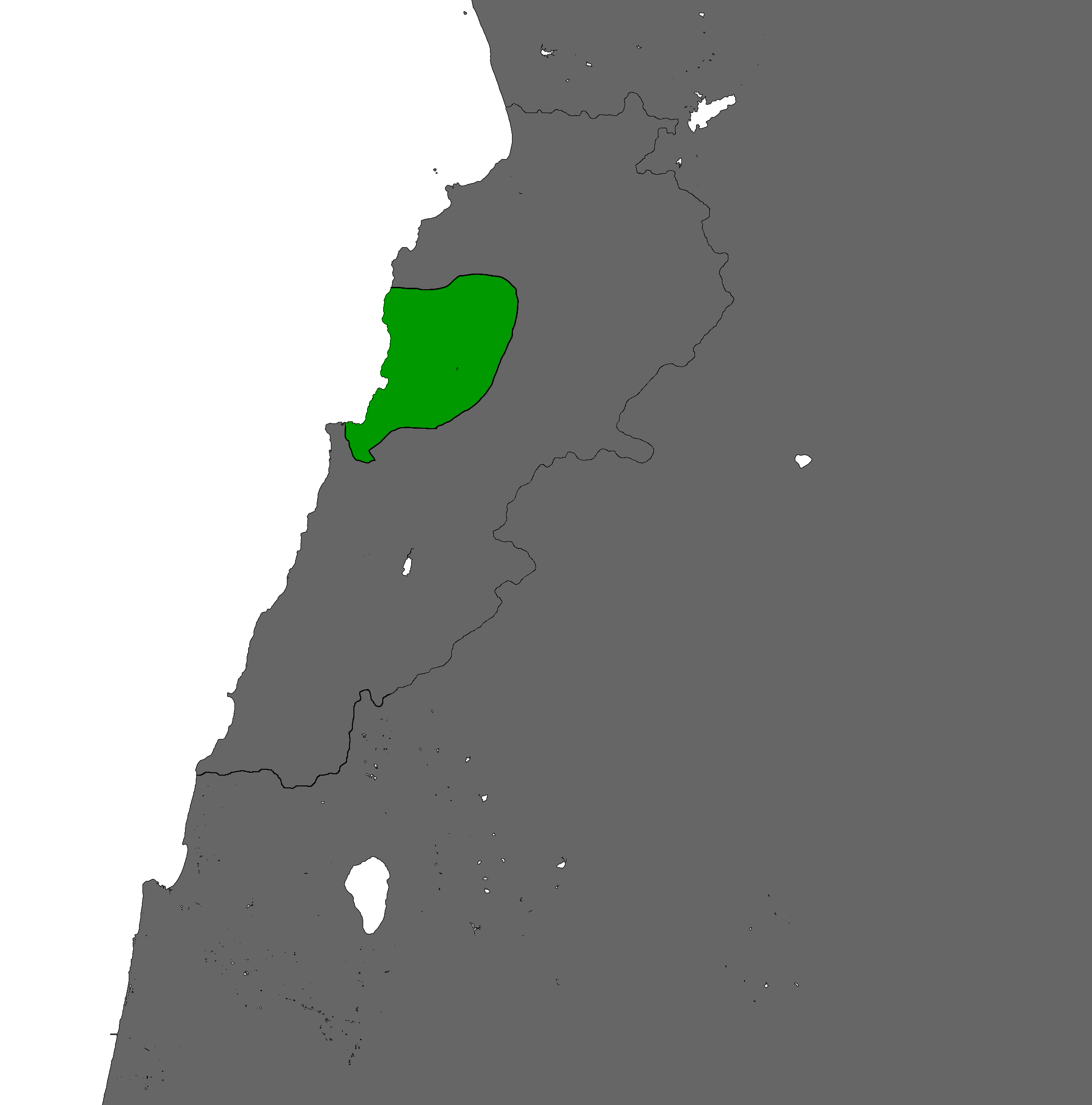
Marounistan stretched from East Beirut to Bcharre.

The Phalange was the first Lebanese faction to carve out its own Canton in late 1976, designated variously as the East Beirut canton, "Christian Country", "Maronite enclave" or "Marounistan". Covering a surface of 2,000 square kilometers, the Canton comprised the Matn District, most of the Keserwan District, along with East Beirut, and the coastal districts of Jounieh, Amsheet, Byblos and parts of Batroun.

Considered by many analysts as the best organized of all militia "fiefs" in the whole of Lebanon, it was administrated by a network of Phalangist-controlled business corporations headed by "Chef" Boutros Khawand, which included the GAMMA Group brain-trust, the DELTA computer company, and the SONAPORT holding. The latter run since 1975 the legal commercial ports of Jounieh and Beirut, including the infamous clandestine "Dock Five" (French: Cinquième basin), near the Karantina KRF's HQ, from which the Phalange extracted additional revenues by levying illegal taxes and carried out drug-trafficking and arms-smuggling operations.

The Canton was also served by a clandestine-built airstrip, the Pierre Gemayel International Airport, opened in 1976 at Hamat, north of Batroun, and had its own radio station, "The Voice of Lebanon" (Arabic: Iza'at Sawt Loubnan) or "La Voix du Liban" (VDL) in French, set up in that same year.

== Controversy ==
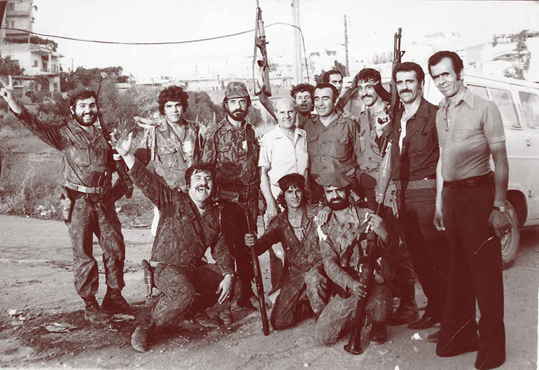
William Hawi with Kataeb militiamen at Tel al-Zaatar, 1976.

Stubborn and ruthless fighters with a reputation for racketeering, the Phalangists themselves were not above committing sectarian violence, a trait they manifested early on in the years leading to the civil war. On 24 March 1970 a squad of Phalange militiamen led by Bashir Gemayel ambushed a PLO funeral cortege heading for Damascus when it passed through the Christian village of Kahale in the Aley District, killing ten people and wounding an even greater number, mostly Palestinians.

Apart from being implicated in the early April 1975 Bus massacre that is commonly presented as the spark that triggered the civil war, the Kataeb RF perpetrated the infamous Black Saturday killings – allegedly carried out by Phalange military commander Joseph Saadeh in retaliation for the assassination of his son – that killed about 200–300 Lebanese Muslim and Druze residents of East Beirut and drove 50,000 others out between December 1975 and January 1976.

During July–August of that same year, the Phalangists participated alongside its allies, the Army of Free Lebanon (AFL), Al-Tanzim, NLP Tigers Militia, Guardians of the Cedars (GoC), the Tyous Team of Commandos (TTC) and the Lebanese Youth Movement (LYM) in the sieges – and subsequent massacres – of Karantina, Al-Masklah and Tel al-Zaatar at the Muslim-populated slum districts and adjacent Palestinian refugee camps of East Beirut, and at the town of Dbayeh in the Matn District.

The Kataeb RF was equally involved in atrocities committed against rival Christian militias' and their leaders, namely the Ehden massacre in June 1978 which cost the life of Tony Franjieh, head of the Marada Brigade, and the Safra massacre of July 1980, on which the Phalangists destroyed the NLP Tigers Militia (though they prudently allowed the Tigers' own Commander Dany Chamoun to escape to exile). In May 1979, the Phalangists even battled both the NLP Tigers and the Guardians of the Cedars for control of the Furn esh Shebbak and Ain el-Rammaneh districts in East Beirut, and for the town of Akoura in the Byblos District.

Sporadic clashes with the Lebanese government military and security forces also occurred. During the blockade of Tel al-Zaatar on 11 January 1976, KRF militiamen fired on a Lebanese Army relief convoy that was trying to enter the camp, killing two regular soldiers. On 1 November 1978, at the Saint Nicholas Church crossing in Achrafieh, KRF militiamen ambushed the motorcade of the then Lebanese Defense and Foreign Affairs Minister Fouad Boutros, escorted by a commando detachment from the Counter-sabotage regiment (Arabic: Moukafaha). Four commandos were wounded and several others taken prisoner, including the commander of the escort, Lieutenant Kozhayya Chamoun, who subsequently disappeared without a trace while on KRF custody (presumably assassinated). The ambush was carried out in retaliation for the death of the pro-Phalangist Captain Samir el-Achkar, leader of the dissident Lebanese Army Revolutionary Command (LARC) and a close friend of Bashir Gemayel, during a raid by the Moukafaha commandos on his headquarters at Mtaileb in the Matn District earlier that same day. Later on 31 October 1980, the KRF even attacked Lebanese Army' positions at the Ain el-Rammaneh district in East Beirut and forced a hasty withdrawal of all Army units from the area.

== The KRF in the 1975–76 Civil War ==
During the 1975–76 phase of the Lebanese Civil War, the Kataeb Regulatory Forces' own mobilization and street action skills allowed the Phalangists to become the primary and most fearsome fighting force in the Christian-conservative camp. In Beirut and elsewhere, Phalange' militia sections were heavily committed in several battles against Lebanese National Movement (LNM) leftist militias and suffered considerable casualties, notably at the Battle of the Hotels in October 1975 where they fought the Al-Mourabitoun and the Nasserite Correctionist Movement (NCM), and later at the "Spring Offensive" held against Mount Lebanon in March 1976.

In January 1976, the Phalange joined the main Christian parties – National Liberal Party (NLP), Lebanese Renewal Party (LRP), Marada Brigade, Al-Tanzim, Maronite League and others – in a loose coalition, the Lebanese Front, designed to act as a political counterweight to the predominantly Muslim LNM alliance. In order to deal with the Syrian military intervention of June 1976 and better coordinate the military operations of their respective militias, Christian militia leaders agreed to form on 31 August that year a joint military command (a.k.a. the "Command Council") whose new collective name was the 'Lebanese Forces'.

=== Reversals and re-organization 1977–79 ===
From the very beginning, it became clear that the Lebanese Front's Command Council was dominated by the Phalange and its KRF militia under the charismatic leadership of Bashir Gemayel, who sought to unify the various Christian militias by using the LF to build a new power base for himself, distinct from that of the Phalange or any of the other traditional rightist parties. From 1977 Bashir implemented the controversial "unification of the rifle" policy, on which his KRF units destroyed those smaller militias who had refused to be absorbed voluntarily into the new structure, though not without factional quarreling and setbacks.

The Phalangists' failure to absorb or destroy the rival Marada Brigade of the Frangieh Clan in the months immediately after the Ehden killings of June 1978 resulted in a severe blow to Bashir's plans. Not only had the Marada (and the Frangiehs) survived intact despite the loss of their Commander, but also succeeded in defeating and ruthlessly driving the KRF out of the Koura District of northern Lebanon. By the end of 1979, the Marada had kidnapped or slaughtered nearly 100 Kataeb Party' members and forced another 25,000 to flee the region or go underground. That same year, the Phalangists' also failed to force the Lebanese Armenian political parties and their respective militias into joining the Lebanese Forces. The main political parties representing the Armenian community in Lebanon – the Armenian Revolutionary Federation (ARF or Tashnag Party), the Armenian Democratic Liberal Party (ADLP or Ramgavar Party) and the Armenian Social Democratic Party (ASDP or Hunchak Party) – remained fiercely neutral and successfully rebuffed any attempts to be incorporated into the LF, even though the KRF kept them under strong pressure by shelling the Armenian-populated quarters of Bourj Hammoud, Camp Marash and Nabaa in East Beirut.

In between, the KRF lent discreet backing to the Army of Free Lebanon (AFL) and the NLP Tigers militias besieged by the Syrian Army respectively on the AFL Fayadieh barracks and the Tigers' Sodeco Square HQ at Achrafieh, during the Hundred Days' War in early February 1978. They later played a key role on August by helping their allies in evicting the remaining Syrian units out from East Beirut.

=== Consolidation and dissolution 1980–81 ===
Notwithstanding the heavy blow inflicted by the Koura disaster on the Phalangists' political and military prestige, their unification policy continued unabated. In July 1980 Bashir Gemayel proceeded to dismantle the military infrastructure of the NLP Tigers led by his rival Dany Chamoun, with the KRF destroying the backbone of the National Liberals' militia and incorporating the rest after fierce fighting in the East Beirut area that lasted until November that year. By early November 1980, the integration process had been completed and on November 22, following a solemn ceremony held at the Municipal Stadium in Jounieh (Arabic: Yawm Al-Waed or the "Day of the Promise"), the Kataeb Regulatory Forces officially ceased to exist as a separate entity, now replaced by the new Lebanese Forces (LF) militia as the dominant Christian force.

== Force 75 ==
The Force 75 (Arabic: القوة خمسة وسبعون | Al-Quwwāt Khmst wa Sabeun), also designated the 75th Battalion (Arabic: الكتيبة الخامسة والسبعين | Al-Katibat al-Khamisat wa al-Sabein) or 75th Brigade (Arabic: اللواء الخامس والسبعين | Al-Liwa' al-Khamis wa al-Sabein), was the personal militia of Amine Gemayel, Bashir Gemayel's elder brother. Technically a territorial unit of the Kataeb Regulatory Forces, the Force 75 usually operated in the north of the Matn District, where it was primarily based, though they also fought at East Beirut, participating in the final phase of the Tel al-Zaatar battle on July–August 1976.

Commanded by Sami Khoueiry, former head of the "Bashir Gemayel Brigade", and headquartered at the upper Matn town of Jdeideh, the militia was directly dependent of the Phalange regional committee headed by Amine Gemayel and enjoyed a considerable autonomy from the KRF War Council in Beirut.

Raised in 1975–76 with material help from the Lebanese Army and trained by the then Colonel Ibrahim Tannous, the Force 75 was financed by a small network of private business companies that included the ASU, colloquially known as the "Amin Special Unit" (Arabic: وحدة أمين الخاصة | Wahdat 'Amin al-Khasa), which excelled in extracting revenues from local traders in the form of paid services and protection rackets.

By December 1980, the Force 75 aligned 3,000 uniformed fighters organized into several light infantry companies backed by technicals equipped with Heavy machine-guns, recoilless rifles and AA autocannons. That same month, however, the militia was forcibly disarmed by the newly constituted Lebanese Forces (LF) on Bashir's orders and in January 1981 its members were absorbed into the LF structure.

== Weapons and equipment ==
Prior to the war, the Kataeb militia initially received covert support from the Lebanese Army, Egypt and Jordan, and from well-connected right-wing sympathisers in Spain, France, Belgium, Britain, and West Germany. Weapons were procured in the international black market or directly from eastern bloc countries, namely Czechoslovakia, Bulgaria and Romania; from January 1976 onwards they were secretly financed and armed by Israel, though they also received some aid from Syria. The collapse of the Lebanese Armed Forces (LAF) and the Internal Security Forces (ISF) in January 1976, coupled by the massive influx of Israeli military aid, enabled the KRF to be re-equipped with a variety of modern small-arms and heavy weapons seized from LAF barracks and ISF Police stations or supplied by the Israelis. Besides providing training, weapons and ammunition, the Lebanese Army also lent to the KRF sophisticated mobile communications equipment.

=== Small-arms ===
Phalangist militiamen were provided with a variety of small arms, comprising Lee–Enfield SMLE Mk III, Pattern 1914 Enfield, MAS-36 and Karabiner 98k bolt-action rifles, M1 Garand (or its Italian-produced copy, the Beretta Model 1952), Vz. 52 and SKS semi-automatic rifles, PPD-40, PPSh-41, M1A1 Thompson, Sten Mk V, MAT-49, Škorpion vz. 61, Carl Gustaf m/45 (or its Egyptian-produced version, dubbed the "Port Said"), Walther MPL and Sterling L2A3/Mark 4 submachine guns. Assault rifles and carbines consisted of Sturmgewehr 44, M16A1, FN FAL (variants included the Israeli-produced 'lightened' ROMAT), FN CAL, Heckler & Koch G3, SIG SG 543 carbines, SIG SG 542, Vz. 58, AK-47 and AKM assault rifles (other variants included the Zastava M70, Chinese Type 56, Romanian Pistol Mitralieră model 1963/1965, Bulgarian AKK/AKKS and former East German MPi-KMS-72 assault rifles).

Several models of handguns were used, including Smith & Wesson Model 10, Smith & Wesson Model 13, Smith & Wesson Model 14, Smith & Wesson Model 15, Smith & Wesson Model 17 and Smith & Wesson Model 19 revolvers, Mauser C96 "broomhandle" pistols, Mauser HSc, Luger P08, Walther P38, Walther PPK, Heckler & Koch P7, Heckler & Koch P9, Tokarev TT-33, CZ 52, CZ 75, CZ 82/83, CZ 85, FN Browning M1910, FN Browning M1922, FN Browning BDA380, FN P35, Beretta M1951, Colt M1911A1, MAB PA-15, Star 30M, and Star A, B, B Super and P pistols.

Squad weapons consisted of Chatellerault FM Mle 1924/29, Bren Mk. I .303 (7.7mm), M1918A2 BAR, MG 34, MG 42, Rheinmetall MG 3, Heckler & Koch HK21, AA-52, RPD, RPK, FN MAG and M60 light machine guns, with heavier Browning M1919A4 .30 Cal, Browning M2HB .50 Cal, SG-43/SGM Goryunov and DShKM machine guns being employed as platoon and company weapons. Grenade launchers and portable anti-tank weapons included M203 grenade launchers, M9A1 80mm Bazookas, LRAC Mle 50, M72 LAW, RPG-2 and RPG-7 rocket launchers, whilst crew-served and indirect fire weapons comprised M29 81mm light mortars, plus B-10 82mm, B-11 107mm and M40A1 106mm recoilless rifles (often mounted on technicals). Soviet PTRS-41 14.5mm anti-tank rifles were used for heavy sniping.

=== Armoured and transport vehicles ===
A predominately light infantry force, the KRF raised early in 1975 a mechanized corps made of gun trucks and technicals. The corps' inventory consisted mainly of commandeered M151A1 utility trucks, VIASA MB-CJ6 and Willys M38A1 MD jeeps, Land-Rover series II-III, Santana Series III (Spanish-produced version of the Land-Rover series III), Morattab Series IV (Iranian-produced unlicensed version of the Land-Rover long wheelbase series III) Toyota Land Cruiser (J40/J42) and Dodge Power Wagon W200 pickups, Dodge D series (3rd generation), GMC Sierra Custom K25/K30, Chevrolet C-10/C-15 Cheyenne and Chevrolet C-20 Scottsdale light pickup trucks, and Mercedes-Benz Unimog 406 light trucks, GMC C4500 medium-duty trucks, GMC C7500 heavy-duty cargo trucks, and US M35A2 2½-ton cargo trucks, equipped with heavy machine guns (HMGs), recoilless rifles and anti-aircraft autocannons. For logistical support, the KRF relied on Toyota Land Cruiser (J42) hardtop pickups, Range Rover first generation Sport utility vehicles (SUV), Chevrolet C-20 Scottsdale light pickup trucks, GAZ-66, Chevrolet C-50 medium-duty, Dodge F600 medium-duty and GMC C4500 medium-duty trucks, and GMC C7500 heavy-duty cargo trucks; a number of Chevrolet/GMC G-Series third generation vans were used as military ambulances.

The Phalangists' own modest armored force of five homebuilt armored cars employed in October 1975 at the Battle of the Hotels in Beirut was also augmented in January 1976 with some ex-LAF vehicles such as AMX-13 and M41A3 Walker Bulldog light tanks, Charioteer tanks, M42A1 Duster SPAAGs, M113 and Panhard M3 VTT armored personnel carriers, Panhard AML-90 armored cars, Staghound armoured cars, and Cadillac Gage V-100 Commando cars. This enabled the quick expansion of the KRF armoured corps to brigade strength, further augmented by a consignment of twenty ex-Israeli M50 Super Sherman medium tanks (one M50 tank was later lent to the allied Guardians of the Cedars militia, leaving the KRF with a total of 19 Shermans) and M3/M9 Zahlam half-tracks, plus a number of BTR-152 APCs captured from the Syrians or supplied by Israel.

=== Artillery ===
Their artillery corps was equally expanded after obtaining a number of British QF Mk III 25 Pounder field guns, French Mle 1950 BF-50 155mm howitzers, Soviet M1938 (M-30) 122 mm howitzers, British Bofors 40mm L/60 anti-aircraft guns and Soviet AZP S-60 57mm anti-aircraft guns. Soviet ZPU (ZPU-1, ZPU-2, ZPU-4) 14.5mm, Yugoslav Zastava M55 20mm and ZU-23-2 23mm AA autocannons (mostly mounted on technicals and heavier transport trucks) were employed in the direct fire support role. In addition to field artillery and AA autocannons, the KRF also employed SNEB 68mm (2.7-inch) unguided rocket projectiles fired from locally built eight-tube Multiple rocket launchers installed on Technicals. These artillery pieces and rocket systems were either seized from LAF stocks, acquired on the black market or even provided by Israel and Syria.

== Uniforms and insignia ==
=== Fatigue clothing ===
The KRF adopted early on the Lebanese Army olive green fatigues (a special domestic variant of the US Army OG-107 cotton sateen utilities) as their standard field dress, though surplus American olive green tropical uniforms, the US Army OG-107 utilities and the M1967 Jungle Utility Uniform, and later Israeli olive drab Uniform "B" (Hebrew: Madei Bet) fatigues were used as well.

Camouflage uniforms consisted of "Duck Hunter" pattern fatigues of South Korean origin, Czechoslovak Vz 60 "Salamander" (Mlok) pattern fatigues, Syrian or captured PLO Lizard horizontal and vertical patterns' fatigues, and Lebanese Army Lizard-style pattern (colloquially nicknamed mlukhiyah, a.k.a. molokhia or molohiya) fatigues; the latter was a unique Lebanese-designed pattern which incorporated dense vertical stripes of dark brown and olive green on a pinkish-tan or khaki background. Originally developed in the late 1960s or early 1970s for the Lebanese Commando Regiment, this pattern saw widespread usage with the Christian Lebanese Front militias.

Civilian or surplus military Parkas and OG US M-1965 field jackets (either taken from Lebanese Army stocks or provided as aid by Israel) were worn in cold weather.

=== Headgear ===
Standard headgear for all-ranks was a black beret, with a few selected 'Commando' units adopting a maroon beret instead, usually worn French-style, pulled to the left; ex-Lebanese Army Olive Green OG-106 Baseball caps were also commonly used, along with OG or khaki Baseball-style field caps provided with a folding round neck flap (which, judging from photographic evidence, appeared to have been quite popular among Christian Lebanese Front militiamen). Camouflage field caps and bucket hats in the South Korean "Duck Hunter" pattern, and baseball caps in the Lebanese mlukhiyah pattern were also used. Besides berets, caps and hats, fur-lined cloth bomber hats, civilian knitted woollen caps and military commando caps of various colours were used in the winter.

Cloth or fabric hoods with eye holes, rib-knit single-slit, two-hole or three-hole balaclavas, and dark green plastic or cloth face masks attached to field caps were worn by KRF militiamen to conceal identity.

=== Footwear ===
Standard footwear in the KRF consisted of black leather combat boots, the US Army M-1967 model with DMS "ripple" pattern rubber sole and the French Army "Rangers" BM65 (French: Rangers de l'Armée Française BM65) with double-buckle ankle cuff, which initially came from Lebanese Army stocks or were provided by Israel, complemented by high-top Pataugas khaki or olive green canvas-and-rubber patrol boots. Several models of civilian sneakers or "trainers" and "chucks", black Beatle boots, black or brown leather laced low shoes, boat shoes and loafers were also used by KRF militiamen.

=== Helmets and body armour ===
In the field, KRF infantrymen could be found wearing a variety of helmet types, consisting of US M-1 and French M1951 NATO (French: Casque Mle 1951 OTAN) steel helmets taken from Lebanese Army stocks or provided by Israel, coupled by WWII-vintage British RAC Mk II helmets and German M1935 Stahlhelms. Armoured crews, depending on the vehicle they manned, received the standard Lebanese Army dark green tanker's compressed fibre-and-leather crash helmet (French copy of the World War II US Army M-1938 Tanker Helmet, nicknamed the "Gruyére") or the OR-601 and OR-603 tanker's helmets in ballistic Kevlar (Israeli copies of the US fibreglass "bone dome" Combat Vehicle Crewman (CVC) T-56-6 helmet and CVC DH-132 helmet, respectively) provided by Israel. In addition to helmets, some KRF militiamen also used captured flak jackets, in the form of the Ballistic Nylon US M-1952/69 "Half-collar" vest.

=== Accoutrements ===
Web gear consisted of the US Army M-1956 load-carrying equipment (LCE) in khaki cotton canvas captured from the Lebanese Army, Czechoslovak four-cell Vz 58 brown leather magazine pouches, Soviet three-cell and four-cell AK-47 magazine pouches in khaki or olive green canvas, ChiCom Type 56 AK, Type 56 SKS and Type 63 SKS chest rigs in khaki or olive green cotton fabric for the AK-47 assault rifle and the SKS semi-automatic rifle, plus several variants of locally made, multi-pocket chest rigs in cloth, khaki and OG canvas. Brown and black leather belt pouches of various shapes and sizes were locally produced in sets of one, two and three to hold pistol and assault rifles' magazines. In addition, the IDF 1950's "Old style" Tan-Khaki cotton canvas equipment (similar in design to the British Army's 58 pattern webbing) was also widely used and later became standard.

Anti-tank teams issued with the RPG-2 and RPG-7 rocket launchers received the correspondent Soviet rocket bag models in khaki canvas, the gunner backpack 6SH12, the assistant gunner backpack and the munitions bag 6SH11; Polish and East German versions in rubberized canvas were employed as well. Locally-made, personalized black or brown leather holsters and gunbelts were worn by some Phalangist militiamen, particularly by those serving in the KRF 'Commando' units.

== In popular culture ==
The Kataeb Regulatory Forces are featured on 1970s archived TV news footage in the episode of the 2018 Al Jazeera English War Hotels documentary series dedicated to the Holiday Inn Hotel in west Beirut.

== See also ==
- Army of Free Lebanon
- Al-Tanzim
- Battle of the Hotels
- Bachir Gemayel
- East Beirut canton
- Kataeb Party
- Karantina massacre
- January 1986 Lebanese Forces coup
- Lebanese Front
- Lebanese Forces (militia)
- Lebanese Forces – Executive Command
- Lebanese Civil War
- List of extrajudicial killings and political violence in Lebanon
- List of weapons of the Lebanese Civil War
- Maronite League
- Michel Murr
- Najjadeh Party
- Safra massacre
- Siege of Tel al-Zaatar
- Syrian Social Nationalist Party in Lebanon
- Tyous Team of Commandos
- People's Liberation Army (Lebanon)
- Phoenicianism
- William Hawi
- Young Men (Lebanon)
- Zahliote Group
