= Geneviève Gemayel =

Lebanese political figure

- Born: January 23, 1908; Mansoura, Khedivate of Egypt
- Died: March 22, 2003 (aged 95); Lebanon
- Spouse: Pierre Gemayel
- Children: 6 children, including: Bachir Gemayel; Amine Gemayel
- Relatives: Grandsons: Pierre Amine Gemayel; Samy Gemayel; Nadim Gemayel

Geneviève Gemayel (Arabic: جينيفيف الجميل, romanized: Jīnīfīf al-Jumayyil; January 23, 1908 – March 22, 2003) was a Lebanese political figure, pilot and artist. She is remembered for the role she played in Lebanese affairs as the wife of Pierre Gemayel, the founder and leader of the Kataeb Party, and as the mother of Bachir Gemayel and Amine Gemayel, both of whom were elected Presidents of Lebanon.

== Biography ==
Born in Mansoura, Egypt, on 23 January 1908, Geneviève Gemayel was the daughter of the Lebanese cotton and tobacco businessman Elias Kange Gemayel. Her large family with their 12 children moved between Mansoura, Cairo and Bikfaya, a suburb of Beirut, where they spent the summers in the family home. She was educated in a Roman Catholic school in Mansoura where she excelled in both mathematics and craftsmanship. She was also keen on piano playing, photography, and art, learning to paint under César Gemayel, a leading Lebanese painter. She became a talented painter, exhibiting her work in Egyptian shows and receiving an award from King Fuad.

When she was 16, Gemayel became one of the first women in the Middle East to receive a driving licence. When she was 20, she was the first Arab woman to fly an aeroplane.

In 1934, Geneviève Gemayel married her cousin, Pierre Gemayel, in the family residence at Bikfaya. Two years later her husband founded the Kataeb Party, after which the family became deeply involved in Lebanese politics for the rest of their lives. While always behaving discreetly, Geneviève Gemayel remained a member of the party, always ready to assist by receiving and entertaining the many visitors who came to see her husband and later her sons. She is remembered as remaining serene whatever crises hit the family or the country.

The couple had two sons and four daughters, all of whom were brought up attentively by their mother who took care of their education and their leisure interests. While the girls were brought up to be good wives and mothers, the boys were trained for political life. Bachir, the youngest child, was elected president in 1982 but was assassinated before taking up office. Geneviève Gemayel was to suffer another grievous bereavement with the death of her husband two years later in August 1984. She wore black for the rest of her life.

After the death of her husband, Geneviève Gemayel retired to her apartment in Dora. She died on 18 March 2003. After a funeral service in Beirut's St George's Cathedral attended by dignitaries from home and abroad, she was buried in the family tomb in Bikfaya on 19 March.
