= Dominique Borella =

French mercenary (1937–1975)

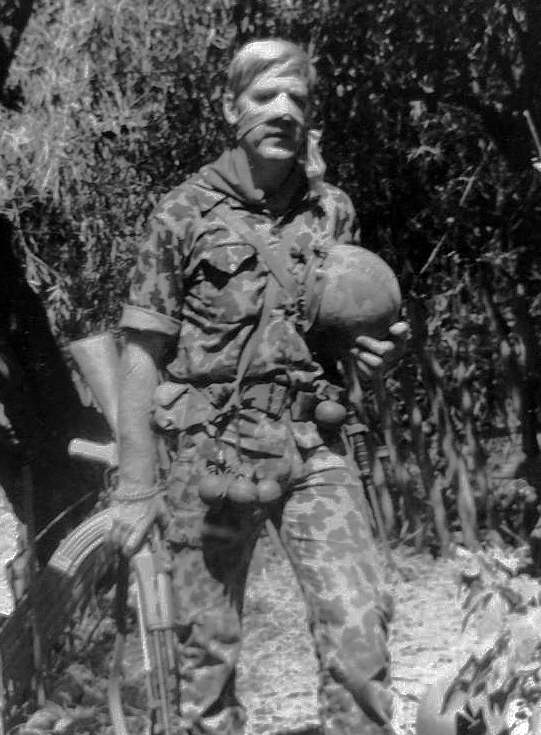
- Borella in February 1975
- Born: 9 July 1937; Moyeuvre-Grande, Grand Est, France
- Died: 29 September 1975 (aged 38); Beirut, Lebanon
- Cause of death: Killed in action
- Occupations: Soldier, Mercenary

Dominique Borella (9 July 1937 – 29 September 1975) was a French soldier and mercenary. Having fought in Indochina during the First Indochina War, he then fought in the Algerian War, both as a soldier and an illegal fighter in the Organisation armée secrète, the Cambodian Civil War and the Lebanese Civil War. He was killed by a sniper while fighting for the Phalanges in 1975.

== History ==
At the age of 18, Borella volunteered to serve in the French Far East Expeditionary Corps in Indochina. He saw action at the Battle of Dien Bien Phu and became one of the youngest recipients of the Médaille militaire. He left Indochina as a Sous-officier in 1956. Borella next saw combat in French Algeria, where he was a Captain in the 2nd Foreign Parachute Regiment. He later joined the Organisation armée secrète (OAS) and went underground.

By 1974, Borella was a Captain in the Khmer National Armed Forces establishing and then commanding the 1ère Brigade Parachutiste Cambodgienne (1st Cambodian Parachute Brigade or 1 BPC). In April 1975 the 1 BPC defended Pochentong Airport during the Fall of Phnom Penh. The Khmer Rouge were keen to take the airport intact and so negotiated safe passage for Borella and his men. The men of 1 BPC disappeared into the countryside, while Borella found refuge at the French Embassy. In early May 1975, Borella along with other French and third-country citizens was evacuated by truck to Thailand.

After returning from Cambodia, Borella was interviewed by Jean-Pax Mèfret, and travelled to Lebanon where he joined the ranks of the Phalanges fighting in the Lebanese Civil War. He was killed in combat in Beirut in 1975, shot by a sniper on September 29, during the Battle of the Hotels.

There were also reports that he was tortured to death.
