= Bachir Gemayel =

Lebanese militia commander (1947–1982)

- بشير الجميّل
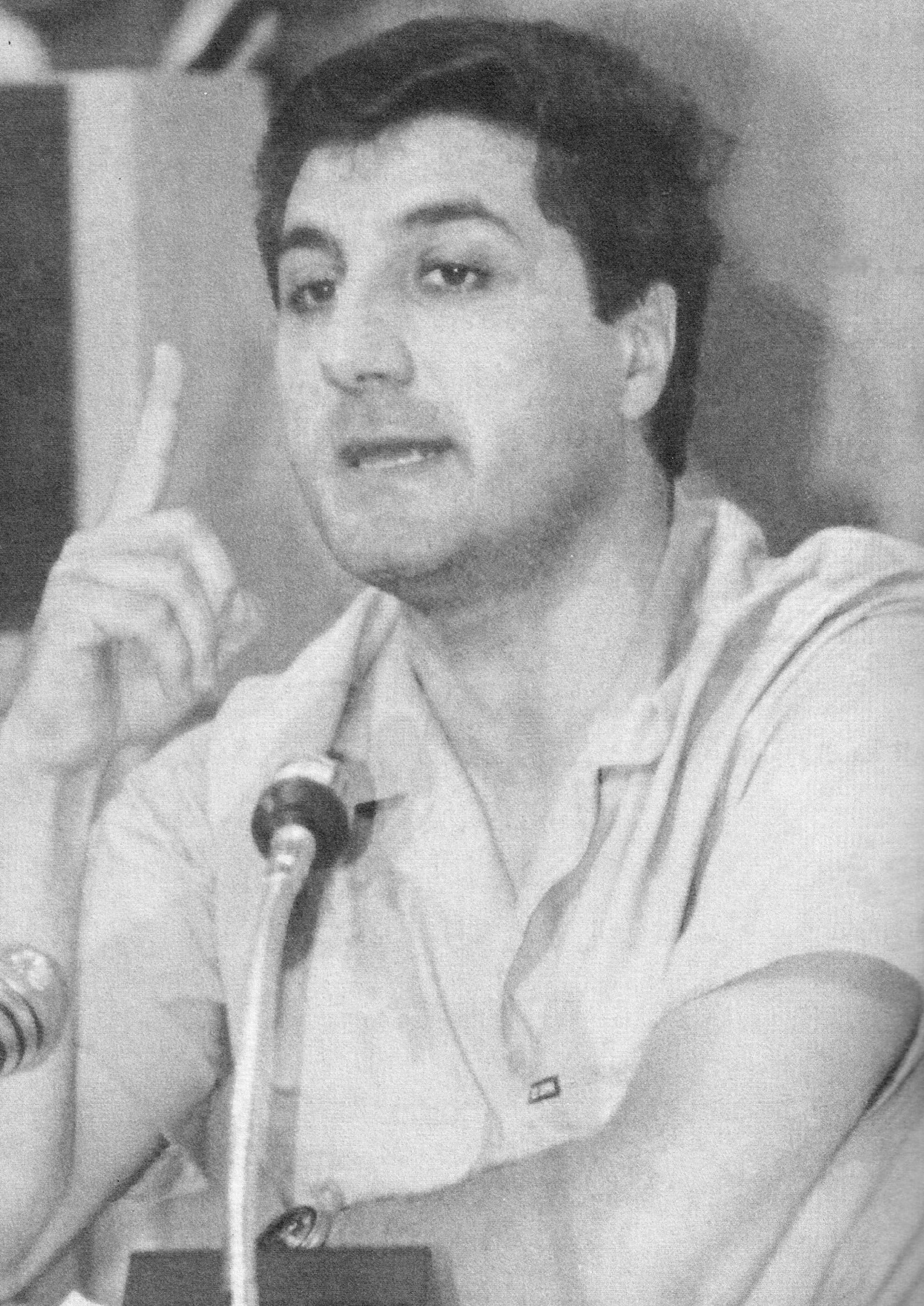
- Gemayel in 1982

President-elect of Lebanon (Note: Assassinated before taking office)
- In role 23 August 1982 – 14 September 1982
- Prime Minister: Shafik Wazzan
- Preceded by: Élias Sarkis
- Succeeded by: Amine Gemayel

Commander of the Lebanese Forces
- In office 18 January 1976 – 14 September 1982
- Preceded by: Office established
- Succeeded by: Fadi Frem

Personal details
- Born: 10 November 1947 Achrafieh, Beirut, Lebanon
- Died: 14 September 1982 (aged 34) Achrafieh, Beirut, Lebanon
- Cause of death: Assassination
- Party: Kataeb Party
- Spouse: Solange Tutunji (m. 1977)
- Children: Maya Gemayel (1978–1980); Youmna Gemayel; Nadim Gemayel
- Parent(s): Pierre Gemayel; Geneviève Gemayel
- Relatives: Amine Gemayel (brother)
- Education: Saint Joseph University
- Occupation: Lawyer

Bachir Pierre Gemayel (Note: Also romanized as Bashir Gemayel) (Arabic: بشير بيار الجميّل, pronounced [baˈʃiːr ʒɪˈmajjɪl]; 10 November 1947 – 14 September 1982) was a Lebanese militia commander and politician who served as the President-elect of Lebanon from 23 August until 14 September 1982. Prior, he led the Lebanese Forces, the military wing of the Kataeb Party, in the Lebanese Civil War and was elected President of Lebanon in 1982.

He founded and later became the supreme commander of the Lebanese Forces, uniting major Christian militias by force under the slogan of "Uniting the Christian Rifle". Gemayel allied with Israel and his forces fought the Palestine Liberation Organization and the Syrian Army. He was elected president on 23 August 1982, but was assassinated on 14 September, before taking office, in the explosion of a bomb by Habib Shartouni, a member of the Syrian Social Nationalist Party.

Gemayel is described as the most controversial figure in the history of Lebanon. He remains popular among Maronite Christians, where he is seen as a martyr and an icon. Conversely, he has been criticized for committing alleged war crimes and accused of treason for his relations with Israel.

== Early life ==
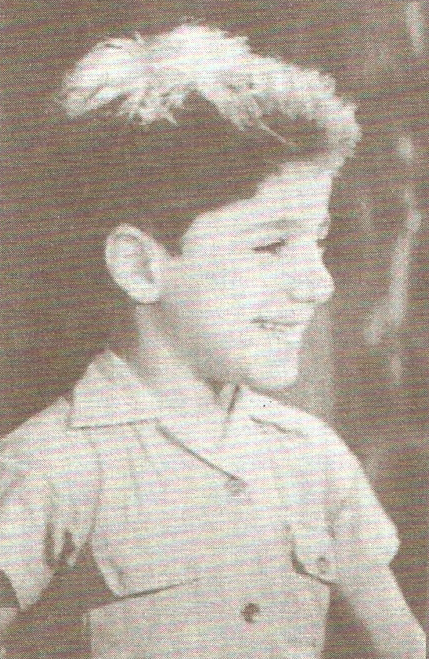
Bachir Gemayel as a child.

Bachir Pierre Gemayel was born in the Achrafieh neighborhood of Beirut on 10 November 1947, the youngest of six children. The Gemayel family originated from Bikfaya village in the Matn District of Lebanon and is one of the most influential Christian families in the country. He attended the Jesuit Collège Notre Dame de Jamhour and the Institution Moderne du Liban (IML) – Fanar. He completed his university education at St. Joseph University (Université Saint-Joseph – USJ) in Beirut.

After teaching for three years at the Lebanese Modern Institute, he graduated in 1971 with a bachelor's degree in law and another in political sciences in 1973. In 1971, Gemayel studied at The Center for American and International Law near Dallas, Texas in the United States. Qualifying in 1972, he joined the bar association and opened an office in Hamra Street, West Beirut.

=== Gemayel family ===
Gemayel's father Pierre Gemayel studied pharmacology in Europe and founded the Phalange Party in 1936 (also known as Kataeb) upon his return to Lebanon, modelling the party after the Spanish and Italian Fascist parties he had observed there. It swelled to 40,000 members. Although he became a Lebanese minister, and was targeted in at least two assassination attempts, Pierre Gemayel never rose to the prominence of his sons, yet remained a powerful figure until his death in 1984.

A month after Gemayel's death, his brother Amine Gemayel was elected president in 1982, remaining in office until the end of his constitutional second term in 1988.

Many of Gemayel's other family members would go on to be elected into the Lebanese parliament: His widow Solange Gemayel (in 2005), his son Nadim Gemayel (in 2009 and 2018), his nephews Sami Gemayel (in 2009 and 2018) and Pierre Amine Gemayel (in 2000 and 2005) who also served as the Minister of Industry from 2005 until his assassination on 21 November 2006.

== Early activities in the Kataeb Party ==
Gemayel became a member of the Kataeb Party's youth section when he was 12 years old. He realized the dangers that surrounded Lebanon in 1958, and spent a lot of time with the organized political wing of the Kataeb Party. He attended the meetings organized by the Kataeb Student Section, and was the president of the Kataeb Circle in St. Joseph University between 1965 and 1971.

In the late 1960s, he underwent paramilitary training in Bikfaya, and he was appointed squad leader of a militia unit of the Kataeb Regulatory Forces (RKF), the party's military wing formed in 1961. In the early 1970s, he formed the "Bikfaya Squad" within the RKF, where he became acquainted with the basics of military combat. In 1968, he participated in a student colloquium organized by the newspaper Orient, following events which occurred across Lebanese universities between the Muslim and leftist Pan-Arabist students supporting the Palestinians in Lebanon on one side, and Christian Lebanese nationalist students (who Gemayel represented) on the other.

After the 1968–69 clashes between the Lebanese Army and the Palestine Liberation Organization (PLO), Gemayel gathered a group of Christian students, and started training them in the Kataeb-run Tabrieh training camp, located near Bsharri in the Keserwan District mountains. This was the start of what would later become the Lebanese Forces. At this stage, he was a junior militia commander under the orders of William Hawi, the founder and head of the KRF.

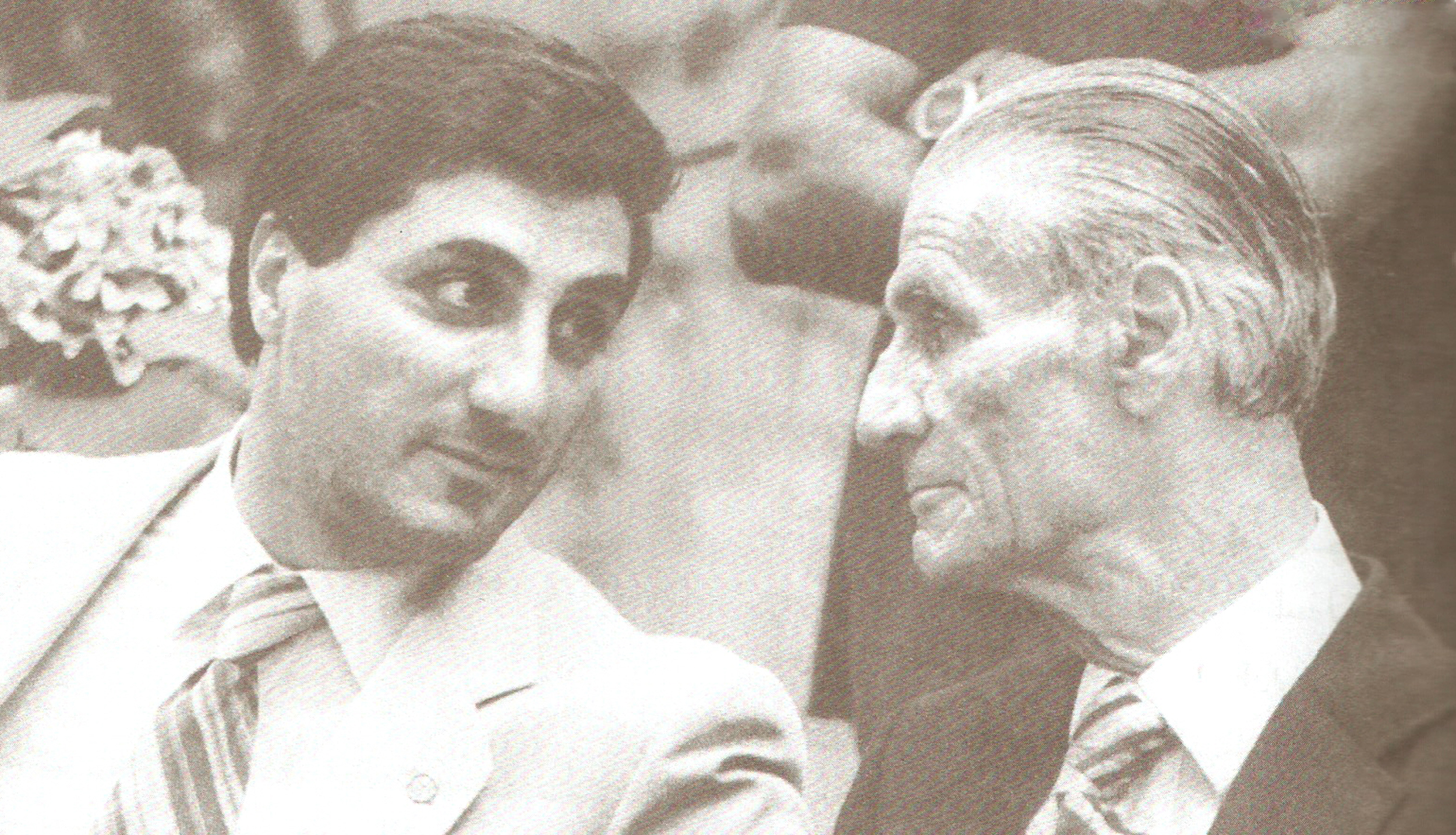
Gemayel with his father Pierre.

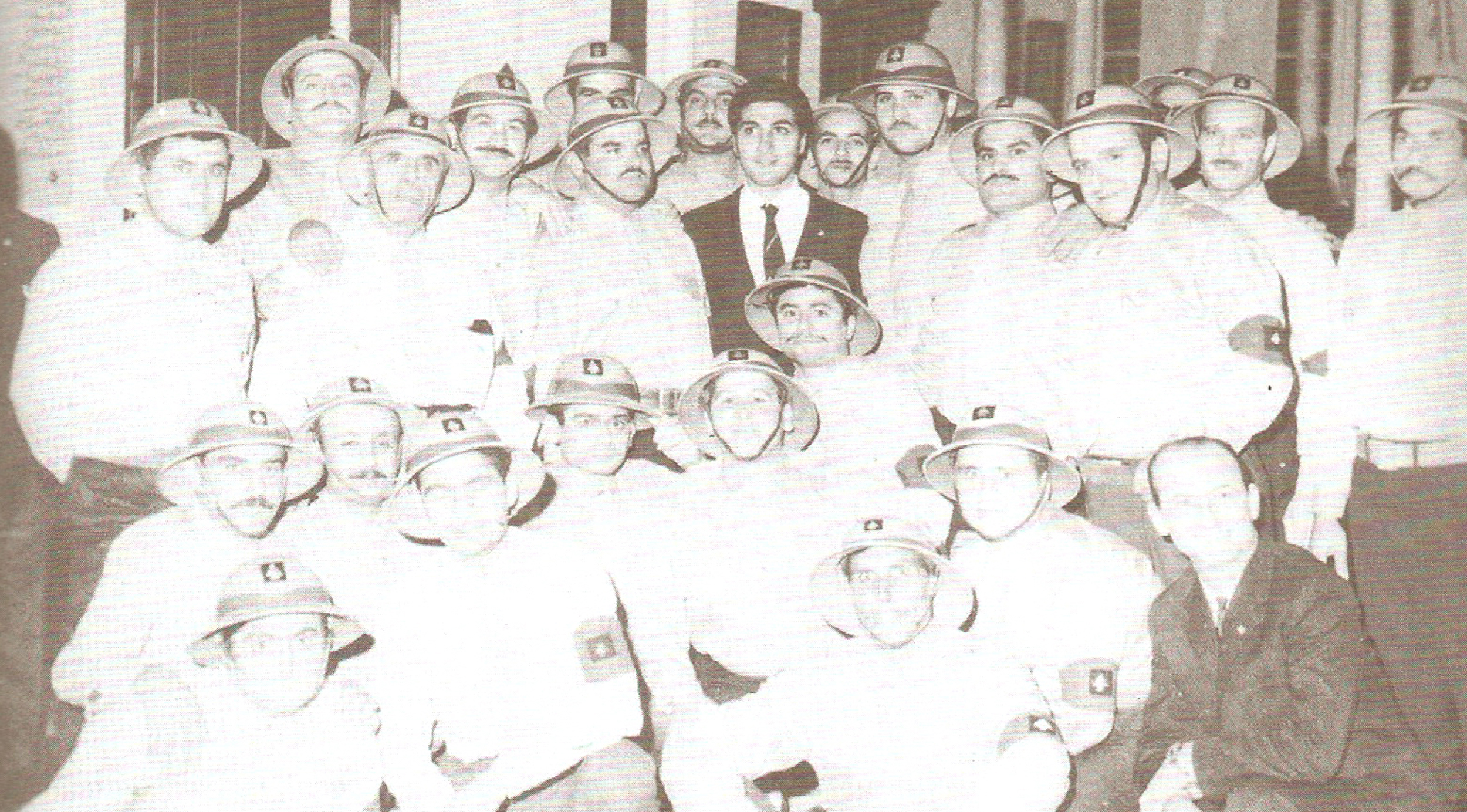
Gemayel with Kataeb Regulatory Forces militiamen.

In 1969, Gemayel was briefly kidnapped by Palestinian militants in Lebanon and taken to the Tel al-Zaatar refugee camp, where he was beaten. He was released eight hours later, after Kamal Jumblatt, who was the interior minister at the time, personally mediated with Yasser Arafat in this matter.

Gemayel became a member of the "BG Squad" of the Kataeb Regulatory Forces formed by William Hawi. He was a revolutionary in the party. He became close with Jean Nader, the leader of Achrafieh at that time, and became the vice president of that Lebanese Capital district, a position that he held from 1971 until 1975.

Gemayel became the head of the "BG Squad" after its members found him as a leader more close to their views. This group was formed of 12 specially trained members such as Fouad Abou Nader, Fadi Frem, Elie Hobeika and others. They were fierce fighters, and they were known for their violent performance in the field. This group was out of the direct control of the party. He had his own views and principles, and he wanted to run for the Vice Presidency of the party, but his men said to him that they wanted him as the leader of the "Lebanese Forces" and not the VP of a party. In addition, many members of the party did not want him as the VP because he was the son of Pierre Gemayel, the founder and president of the party. The elections were cancelled and did not take place until after his assassination.

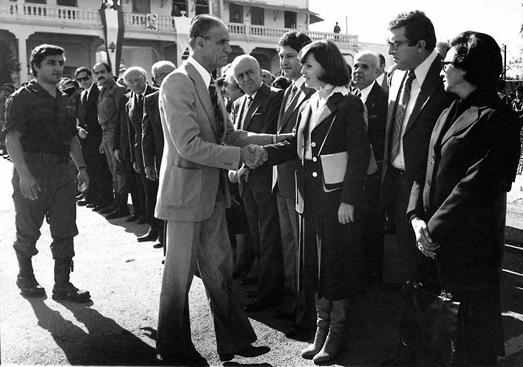
Bachir Gemayel with his father Pierre Gemayel at the Kataeb anniversary event in 1977

Gemayel submitted his resignation from the party in 1976, but it was rejected. This was because the Kataeb Party was forced to approve the entrance of the Syrian Army to Lebanon to put an end to the war, but Gemayel refused to accept this, being strongly against the Syrian intervention because he believed that Syria wanted to annex Lebanon. He came to this conclusion because the Syrian officials repeatedly stated that Lebanon was part of Syria and that the Syrian Army doesn't need anyone's permission to enter Lebanon. Moreover, at that time, the Syrian educational system was teaching that Lebanon was a Syrian district.

== Military command ==
=== Conflict with the PLO ===
In 1975, Gemayel was accused by the Lebanese National Movement (LNM) of being responsible for the Black Saturday massacre of Palestinians and Lebanese Muslims. According to Phalange member Karim Pakradouni, Gemayel admitted to him that while being in an emotional state over the killing of four Phalangists earlier that day, he ordered his militiamen into the streets.

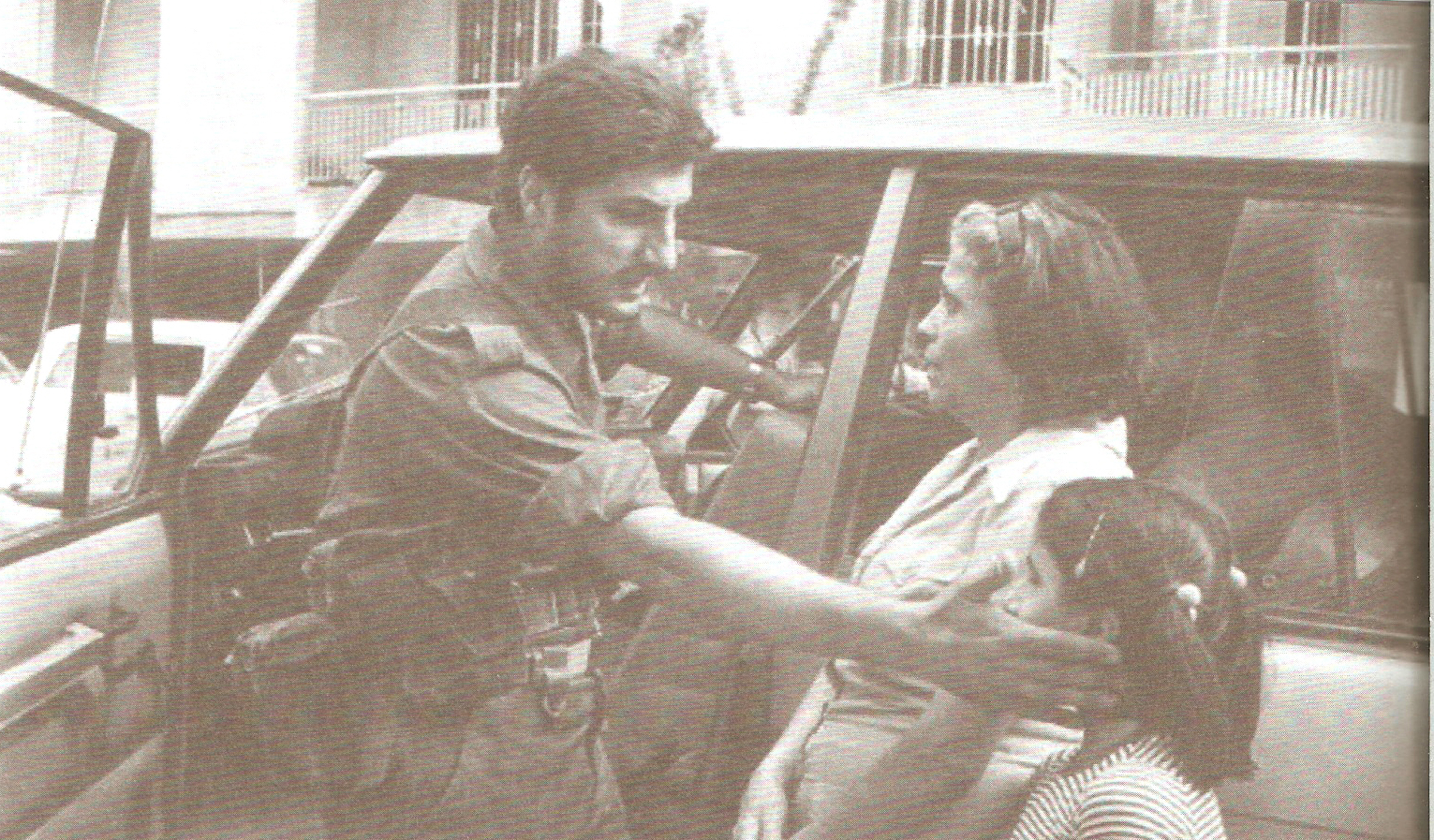
Gemayel in the street

Christian East Beirut was ringed by heavily fortified Palestinian camps from which kidnappings and sniping against Lebanese civilians became a daily routine. Christian East Beirut were besieged by the PLO camps, with severe shortages of food and fuel. This unbearable situation led the Kataeb Forces and their allied Christian militias to besiege the Palestinian camps embedded in Christian East Beirut one at a time and bring them down. On 18 January 1976, Gemayel led the invasion of the heavily fortified Karantina camp that was located near the strategic Beirut Harbor: About 1,000 PLO fighters and civilians were killed. The Palestinian PLO and as-Saiqa forces retaliated by attacking the isolated defenseless Christian town of Damour about 20 miles south of Beirut on the coast, during the Damour massacre in which 1,000 Christian civilians were killed and 5,000 were sent fleeing north by boat, since all roads were blocked off. The Maronites retaliated with the invasion of the Tel al-Zaatar camp that same year, which was placed under siege for 52 days by the Tigers, the National Liberal Party militia led by Dany Chamoun, Gemayel played an important role in the last stages of the battle: he sent a group of his forces that moved through the sewers and they blew up the ammunition storage in the camp. This incident was considered to be the lethal blow that led the fall of the camp. The Christian militias also fought against the PLO and LNM militias at the Battle of the Hotels in central Beirut. Gemayel led the battle for the Holiday Inn that had an important strategic location. The battle was a success for Gemayel's troops, and they were able to move the PLO out of the hotel. After ensuring the safety of the rear lines and their effectiveness (necessary for the safety of Christian East Beirut), Gemayel and his troops decided to abandon the hotel.

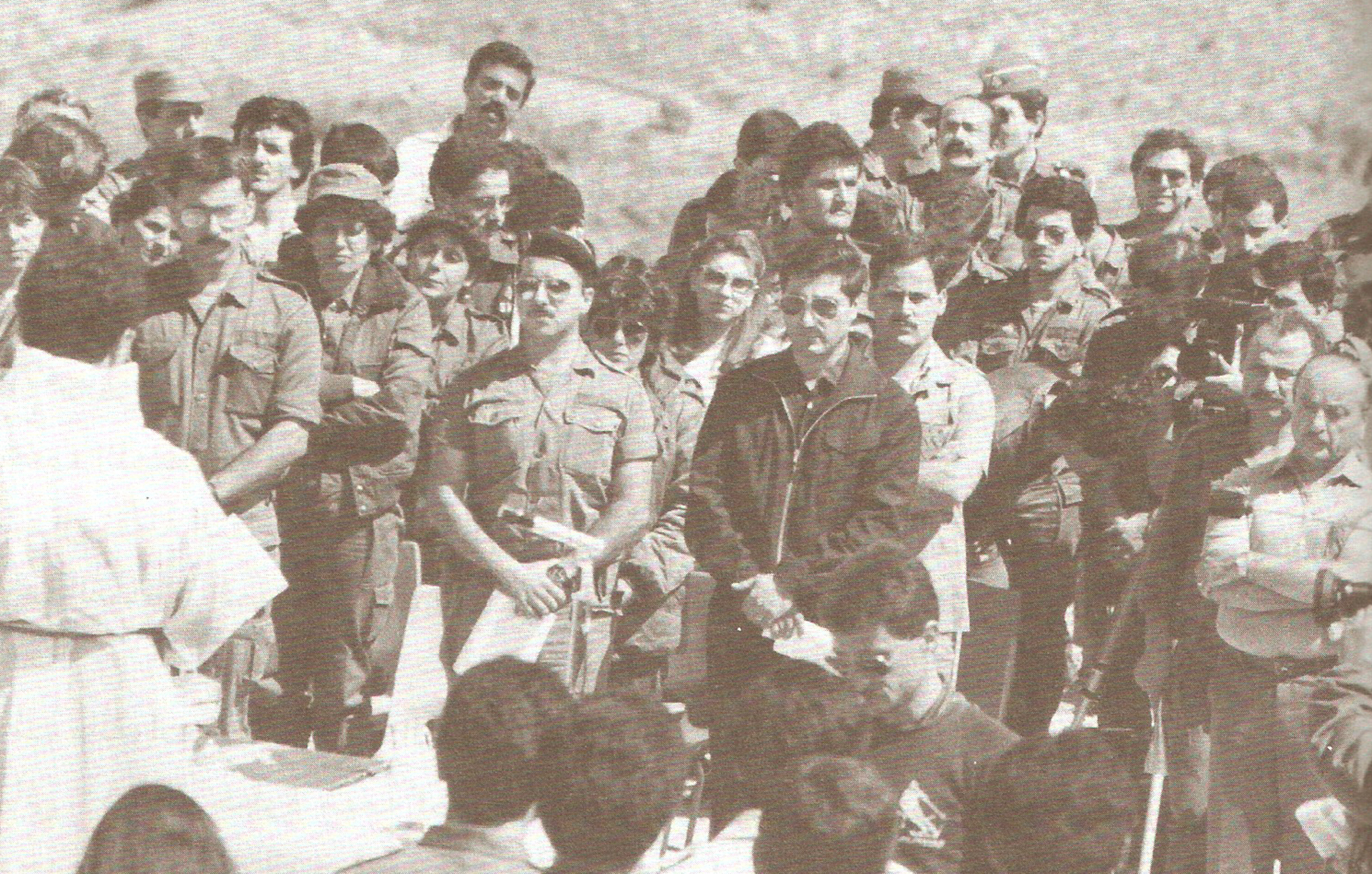
Gemayel attending Mass at a training camp

In 1976, with the death of William Hawi, killed by a sniper during the battle of Tall Al-Zaatar, Gemayel became head of the Kataeb Regulatory Forces militia. Later that year, he became a leading member of the Lebanese Front, a coalition of several Christian parties, and commander of their military wing, the Lebanese Forces (LF). A military coalition of several Christian militias which not only opposed the PLO but also the Syrian Army presence, who had entered Lebanon at first to assist in defeating Palestinian militants, before turning into occupiers.

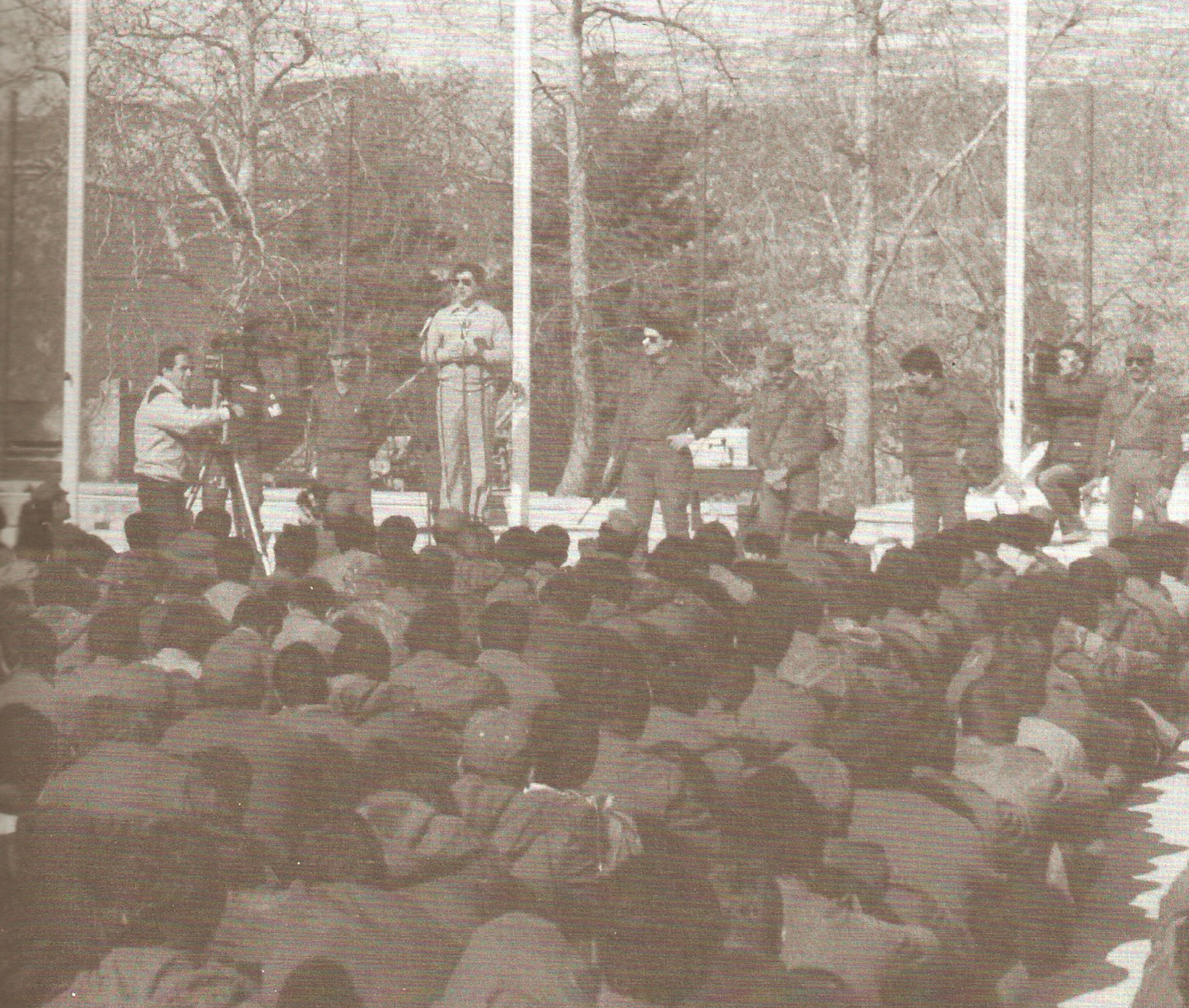
Gemayel giving a speech at "Don Bosco" training camp

Gemayel led his troops in the Hundred Days' War in Lebanon in 1978, in which the Lebanese Forces successfully resisted the Syrian shelling and attacking of Eastern Beirut for about three months before an Arab-brokered agreement forced the Syrians to end the siege. Syrians took high buildings such as Burj Rizk Achrafieh and Burj El Murr using snipers and heavy weapons against civilians. The soldiers stayed for 90 days. Another major clash took place near the Sodeco area in Achrafieh where the LF fought ferociously and led the Syrian army out of the Rizk Building. This War led to the withdrawal of the Syrian troops from East Beirut and the free Christian Areas. At this time, Israel was the primary backer of the Lebanese Front's militia.

In 1981 at Zahlé in the Beqaa Governorate, the largest Christian town in the East, confronted one of the biggest battles – both military and political – between the LF and the Syrian occupying forces. The LF were able to confront them and reverse the result of the battle of 1981 with the help of 92 Lebanese Army Maghawirs sent from Beirut as well as the towns inhabitants. Regardless of the very bad weather and heavy bombing, convoys were sent in the snow to Zahle. The battle of Zahle gave the Lebanese Cause a new perspective in the International Communities, and by some was regarded as military and diplomatic victory. It strengthened Bachir Gemayel's position because of his leadership and important role in this battle. The battle started on 2 April 1981, and finished with a cease fire and Lebanese Internal Security Forces gendarmes were sent to Zahle. The 92 commandos returned to Beirut on 1 July 1981. (See: Battle of Zahleh for more details)

=== Tensions within the Lebanese Front ===
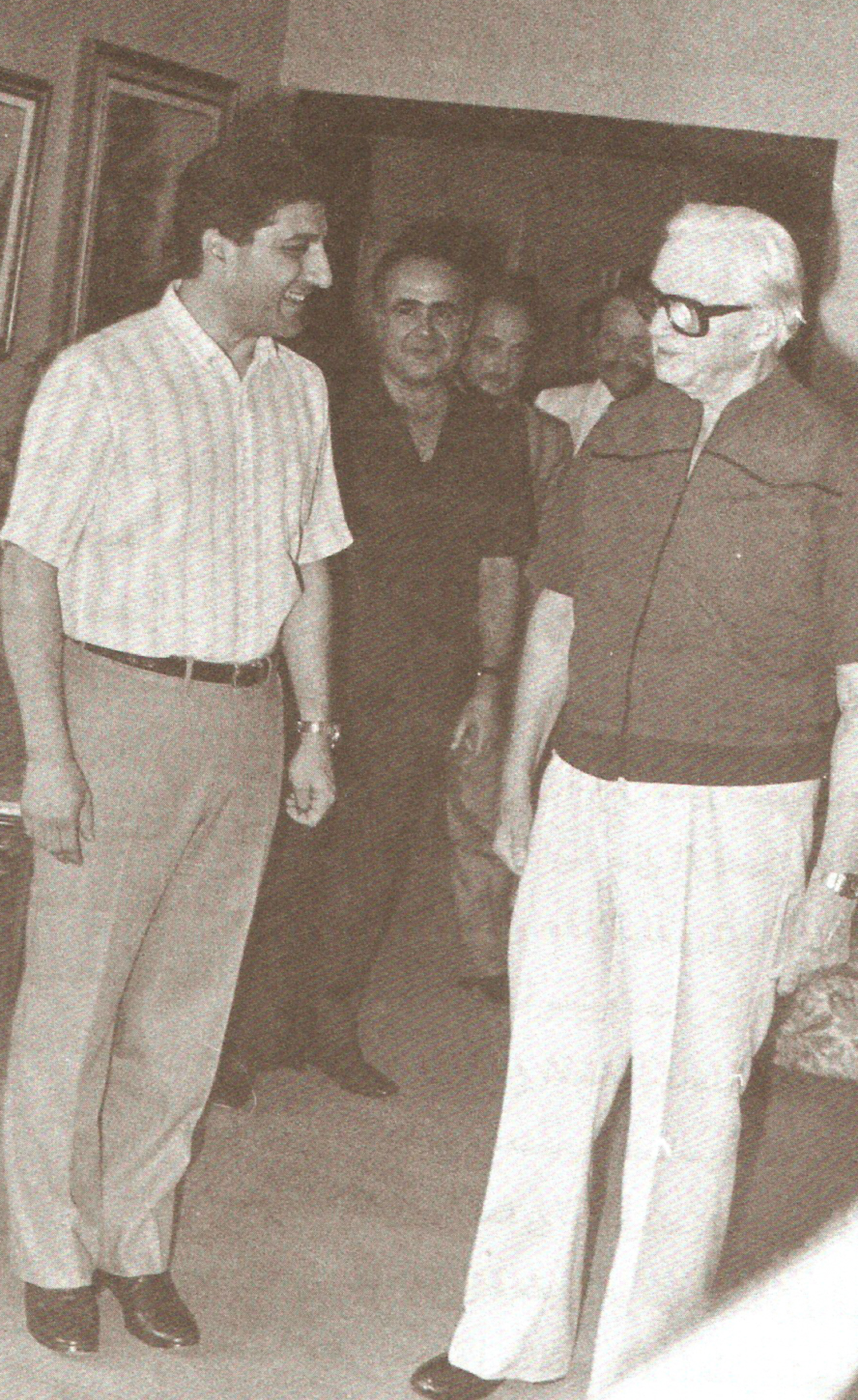
Gemayel with Camille Chamoun.

Despite its increasing success in its battles against the PLO and the Syrian troops two factors led to the eventual demise of the Lebanese Front.

Following the killing of many Phalangist members, in addition to a senior Phalangist by members of the Marada Brigade militia, which was led by a fellow member of the Lebanese Front, Tony Frangieh, Gemayel called for a meeting to decide on what to do about this situation. At first, the decision was to capture Tony Frangieh and force him to surrender the members of the Marada militia who killed the Phalangists. However, there was concern about the consequences of this move. So, the decision was changed after many talks between the Phalangists present at the meeting. It was decided that the goal of the operation would be to capture the members of the Marada militia who killed the Phalangists and it would be done on Tuesday to be sure that Tony Frangieh would have finished his weekend vacation and left Ehden. On 13 June 1978, Gemayel sent a squadron of his men led by Samir Geagea and Elie Hobeika to Ehden; what Gemayel did not know was that Tony Frangieh hadn't left Ehden, as his car wasn't running. As soon as the squadron arrived, bullets were flying all over their heads, so they retaliated and this led to the killing of Tony Frangieh and his family, in addition to tens of members of the Marada militia. The incident is known as the Ehden massacre. Gemayel was angered by this incident, but he stood by his men.

Gemayel and his militia also faced competition from the Tigers, another Christian militia in the Lebanese Front. Multiple clashes occurred between the two sides, mainly caused by the dispute over the distribution of war taxes and military equipment provided by Israel. The Tigers claimed that Gemayel was trespassing on their share, while the Palangists accused them of selling arms to pro-Palestinians. In February 1980, both Gemayel and Chamoun were called up to Jerusalem by Mossad on orders from Menachem Begin. He threatened to stop the Israeli aid and asked them to unite. On 22 February, they were back again in Jerusalem, and presented a secret plan to the Israeli officers.

However, Gemayel wanted to be the only Christian option for Israel, while the tension escalated again by the end of June 1980. On 7 July, he sent his troops to the town of Safra, where Dany Chamoun and members of his Tigers Militia were vacationing. The Tigers under the control of Elias el Hannache were exterminated in what was later named Safra massacre. Dany's life was spared and he sought refuge in West Beirut.

Flag of the Lebanese Forces

He quickly arranged a meeting with leaders of the Phalanges and the National Liberal Party, including Camille Chamoun. He proposed merging the two militias into Lebanese Forces, with him as a commander. This was called the "Operation of Altalena", with which Gemayel became the sole leader of the Christian military side in the civil war.

This move faced opposition from his brother Amine. He opposed merging his forces into the LF, but Pierre Gemayel intervened and ordered them to hand over heavy arms to the LF. While many National Liberals surrendered, some members decided to confront Gemayel. On 10 November, two car bombs exploded in Achrafieh, leaving 10 killed and 92 wounded. Ten days later, he ordered his elite troops to invade their stronghold in Ain El Remmaneh. After two days of fighting, the National Liberals were defeated, and the LF took control the whole area. Gemayel considered the "Unification of the Christian Rifle" to be completed, and ordered all his forces to wear the LF badge instead of their former militias ones.

=== Israeli invasion of Lebanon and Gemayel's election ===
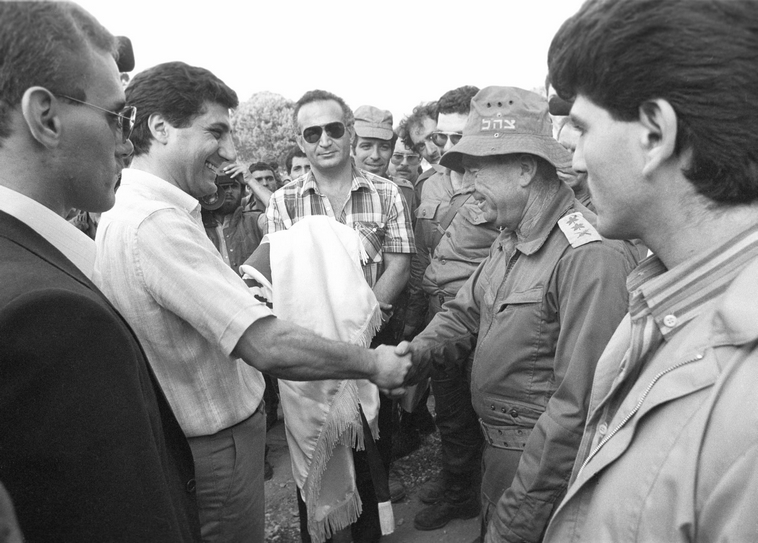
Bachir Gemayel, commander-in-chief of the Lebanese Christian Forces, shaking hands with Rafael Eitan, Israeli chief of staff, in front of Avner Azoulay, representative of the Mossad (center), on June 1, 1982, five days before the Israeli invasion of Lebanon.

Israel invaded Lebanon in 1982. Defense Minister of Israel, Ariel Sharon, met with Gemayel months earlier, telling him that the Israeli Defense Force (IDF) were planning an invasion to uproot the PLO threat to Israel and to move them out of Lebanon. While Gemayel did not control Israel's actions in Lebanon, the support Israel gave the Lebanese Forces, militarily and politically, angered many Lebanese leftists.

Gemayel met with Hani al-Hassan (representative of the PLO) and told him that Israel would enter and wipe them out. He told the PLO to leave Lebanon peacefully before it was too late. Hassan left without replying.

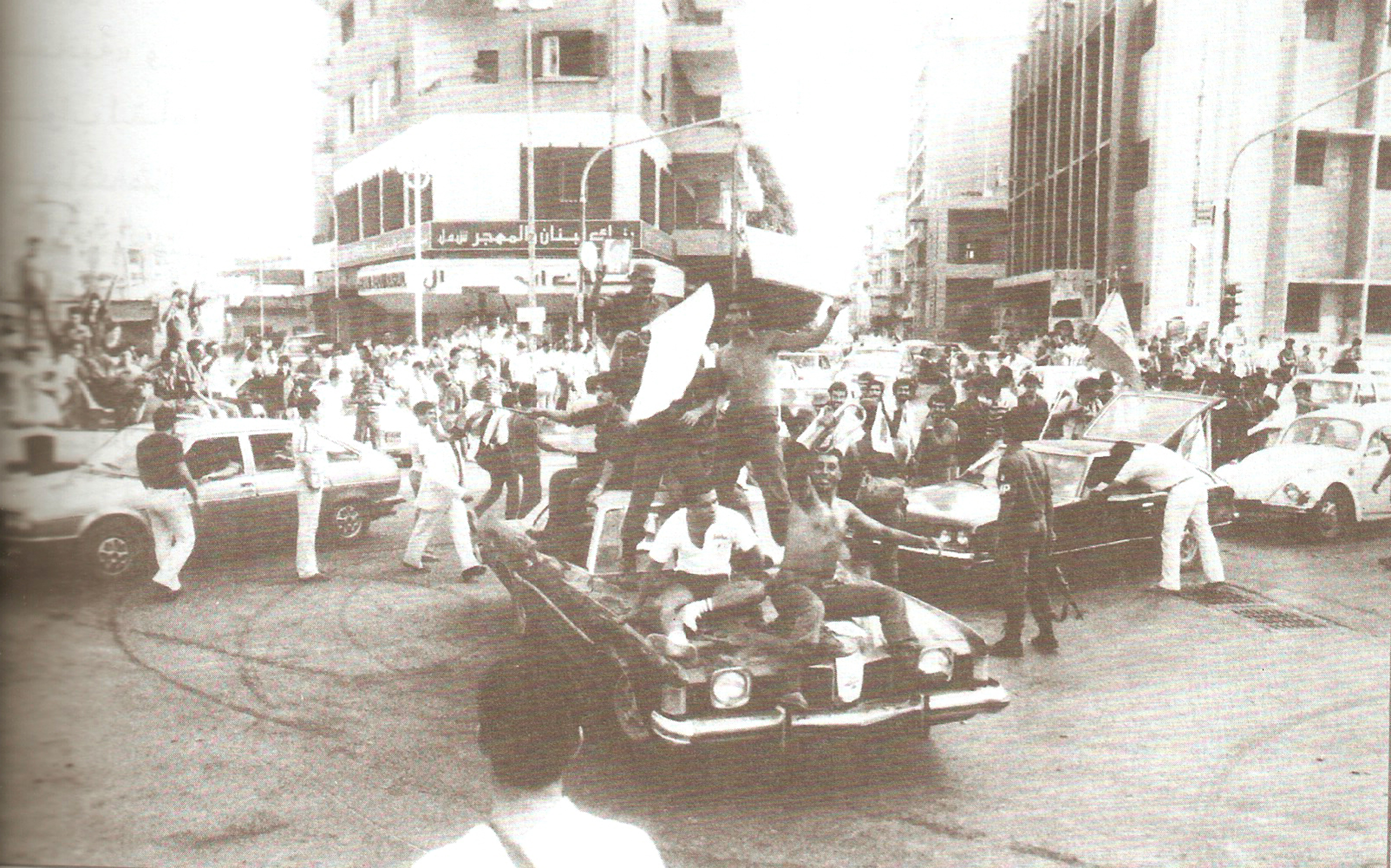
Celebrations in Sassine Square after Gemayel's election

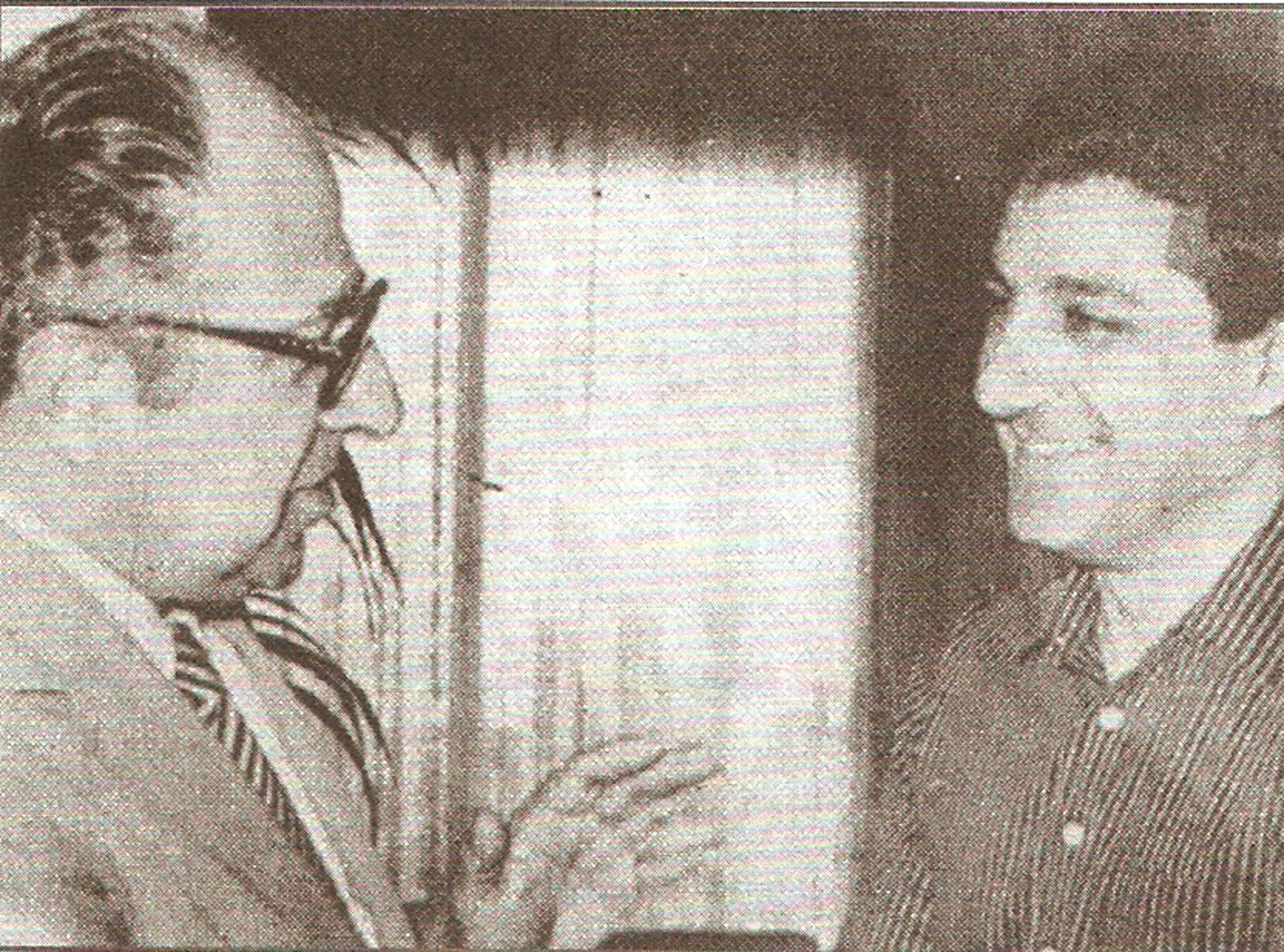
Gemayel with Philip Habib, who played an important role in his election

Israel invaded and the PLO were expelled from Lebanon in August 1982. During the invasion, the Israelis wanted the Lebanese Forces to assist the Israeli Army militarily by fighting the PLO and allied groups in West Beirut; however, Gemayel refused, stating that his forces would not assist an invading army. By then, Gemayel had announced his candidacy for president. He was backed by the United States, who sent peacekeeping troops to oversee the withdrawal of the PLO from Lebanon. Gemayel had requested that they stay longer to keep Lebanon stable until he could reunite it, but his request was denied. Israel's Mossad intelligence agency also contributed to his presidency. On 23 August 1982, being the only one to declare candidacy, Gemayel was elected president, as he prevailed over the National Movement.

On 1 September 1982, Gemayel met the Israeli Prime minister Menachem Begin in Nahariya. During the meeting, Begin demanded that Gemayel sign a peace treaty with Israel as soon as he took office in return of Israel's earlier support of Lebanese Forces; he also told Gemayel that the IDF would stay in South Lebanon if the Peace Treaty wasn't signed. Gemayel was furious at Begin and told him that the Lebanese Forces didn't fight for seven years and that they didn't sacrifice thousands of soldiers to free Lebanon from the Syrian Army and the PLO so that Israel could take their place. Gemayel also added that he would not sign the Peace Treaty without national consensus on the matter.

Begin was reportedly angry at Gemayel for his public denial of Israel's support. Gemayel refused signing a peace treaty arguing that time is needed to reach consensus with Lebanese Muslims and the Arab nations. This angered the Israelis because they knew that it is almost impossible for the Lebanese Muslims to agree on a Peace Treaty. They realized that Gemayel was starting to distance himself from them.

On 12 September 1982, in an attempt to fix the relations between Begin and Gemayel, Ariel Sharon had a secret meeting with Gemayel in Bikfaya. During the meeting, Gemayel told Sharon that the Lebanese Army would soon enter the Palestinian Camps to disarm any remaining fighters. They also agreed that the Lebanese Army would attack the Syrian Army's positions in Lebanon assisted by the Israeli Army. Sharon further tried to convince Gemayel to sign a peace treaty, which he refused to do.

Gemayel had planned to use the IDF to push the Syrian Army out of Lebanon and then use his relations with the Americans to pressure the Israelis into withdrawing from Lebanese territory.

== Assassination ==
On 14 September 1982, Gemayel was addressing fellow Phalangists at their headquarters in Achrafieh for the last time as their leader and for the last time as commander of the Lebanese Forces. At 4:10 PM, a bomb was detonated, killing Gemayel and 26 other Phalange politicians. The first testimonies stated that Gemayel had left the premises on foot or in an ambulance (bearing the number 90). A report from a hospital came to say he had just arrived. Then the commander of military intelligence Jonny Abdu reported that Bachir Gemayel had been taken to a hospital in Haifa by helicopter. The search and rescue teams on the field were unable to find him or his body.

His body was finally identified five and a half hours after the explosion by a Mossad agent in a church close to the site of the explosion where the dead were being collected. The face on the body was unrecognizable; he was identified by the white-gold wedding ring he was wearing and two letters he was carrying addressed to Bachir Gemayel. It was concluded that he had been one of the first people moved to the church after the explosion. Rumors persisted that Gemayel had survived, until it was confirmed the following morning by the Lebanese Prime Minister Shafik Wazzan that he had indeed been killed in the attack. The U.S. Federal Bureau of Investigation blamed the Syrian Social Nationalist Party (SSNP) for the attack.

Habib Shartouni, a member of the Syrian Social Nationalist Party and also a Maronite Christian, was later arrested for the assassination. His sister was living in the apartment above the room Gemayel was staying in. He had visited her the previous day and planted the bomb in her apartment. The next day, he called her and told her to get out of the building. Once she was out, he detonated the bomb from a few miles away using a remote detonator. When he came back to check on his sister, he was immediately arrested. Shartouni later confessed to the crime, saying he had done this because "Bachir had sold the country to Israel." He was imprisoned for 8 years until Syrian troops took over Lebanon at the end of the war and freed him on 13 October 1990. Amine Gemayel did not condemn the actions taken by Habib Shartouni because of immense Syrian pressure. Many point fingers at the Syrian government and then-Syrian President Hafez al-Assad for having knowledge of the assassination attempt and for covertly backing Shartouni.

=== Aftermath ===
Condemnations poured in from around the world, including the United Nations Security Council in Resolution 520 as well as from American President Ronald Reagan. Reagan had been one of Gemayel's staunchest supporters, saying "this promising young leader had brought the light of hope to Lebanon."

Bachir Gemayel's older brother Amine Gemayel was not long after elected president, serving from 1982 to 1988. Rather different in temperament, Amine Gemayel was widely regarded as more moderate than his brother.

Many of Bachir Gemayel's followers were dissatisfied with Amine, which eventually led to the Lebanese Forces becoming independent from the Phalange and forming its own political party.

==== Sabra and Shatila Massacre ====
From September 16 to 18, 1982, Ariel Sharon, the Israeli Minister of Defense whose troops occupied the area, encouraged Phalange militiamen to enter the Palestinian refugee camps of Sabra and Shatila in order to eliminate any potential PLO fighters. There, the militiamen committed a punitive massacre. Between 762 and 3,500 civilians, mostly Palestinians and Lebanese Shiites, were killed in retaliation for the assassination of Gemayel.

== Legacy ==
Gemayel was believed to be an extreme option for the presidency. Muslims and leftist leaders preferred a moderate one, like his brother, Amine, or former president Chamoun. George Hawi revealed in a documentary with Al Jazeera: "Once he was elected, I was sure that he won't get to take over the presidency and he will be assassinated. Many sides were trying to kill him and I was one of them. I didn't succeed while someone else did. He was a solution in the wrong place and the wrong time".

Deputy Nawaf al-Moussawi said in a parliamentary session that Gemayel had reached the presidency "on the back of an Israeli tank", and Professor Christo El Morr compared him to Philippe Pétain. Gemayel is criticized for the use of force against civilians and carrying out massacres against both Muslims and Christians, such as Karantina, Black Saturday and Ehden. He is also accused of racism against Palestinians, Syrians and Arabs. However, Gemayel is viewed positively among the majority of right-wing Christians. They consider him a patriot leader who fought for Christian rights and the autonomy of Lebanon.

== Personal life ==
Gemayel was married to Solange Gemayel with whom he had three children. His eldest daughter, Maya, was murdered on 23 February 1980 at 18 months of age by a car bomb intended for him. His second daughter, Youmna, born in 1980, received her degree in political science in Paris. She was working towards her Masters in Management at École supérieure des affaires (ESA) in Beirut. Gemayel's son, Nadim, who was born a few months before Gemayel's assassination, was a law student and political activist, and was elected as a member of the Lebanese Parliament in 2009.

== See also ==
- List of assassinated Lebanese politicians
- List of attacks in Lebanon
- Amine Gemayel
- Lebanese Civil War
- Lebanese Forces
- Kataeb Party
- Kataeb Regulatory Forces

== Notes ==
Political offices
Preceded by Élias Sarkis	President of Lebanon; Elect; 1982	Succeeded by Amine Gemayel
