= Pierre Gemayel =

Lebanese politician (1905–1984)

- بيار الجميّل
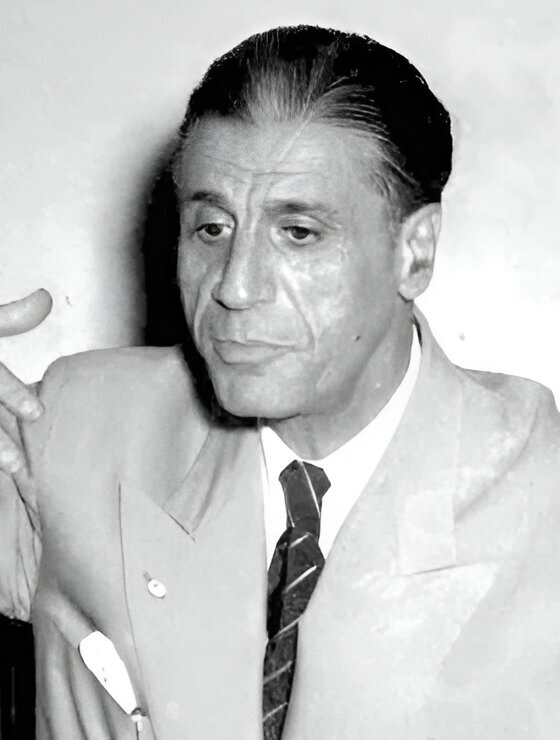
- Gemayel in 1967

Member of Parliament for Beirut
- In office 1960–1984

2nd President of the Lebanese Football Association
- In office 1935–1939
- Preceded by: Hussein Sejaan
- Succeeded by: Farid Ammoun

Personal details
- Born: 6 November 1905 Bikfaya, Beirut Vilayet, Ottoman Empire
- Died: 29 August 1984 (aged 78) Bikfaya, Lebanon
- Resting place: Bikfaya
- Party: Kataeb Party
- Spouse: Genevieve Gemayel
- Children: 6 children, including: Bachir Gemayel; Amine Gemayel
- Relatives: Grandsons: Pierre Amine Gemayel; Samy Gemayel; Nadim Gemayel
- Education: Saint Joseph University
- Occupation: Pharmacist

Pierre Amine Gemayel, also spelled Jmayyel, Jemayyel or al-Jumayyil (Arabic: بيار الجميّل; 6 November 1905 – 29 August 1984), was a Lebanese political leader. A Maronite Catholic, he is remembered as the founder of the Kataeb Party (also known as the Phalangist Party), as a parliamentary powerbroker, and as the father of Bachir Gemayel and Amine Gemayel, both of whom were elected to the presidency of the republic in his lifetime.

He opposed the French Mandate over Lebanon in the late 1930s and early 1940s, and advocated an independent state, free from foreign control. He was known for his deft political maneuvering, which led him to take positions which were seen by supporters as pragmatic, but by opponents as contradictory, or even hypocritical. Although publicly sympathetic to the Palestinian cause, he later changed his position due to Palestinian support of the Lebanese National Movement and its calls to end the National Pact and establish non-sectarian democracy.

Gemayel also had a career in football in the 1930s, captaining the Lebanon national team as a player. He also became the first Lebanese football referee to officiate matches internationally, and was the second president of the Lebanese Football Association, between 1935 and 1939.

== Early life and education ==
Pierre Gemayel was born on 6 November 1905 in Bikfaya, Lebanon into a Maronite family. His father Amine Bachir Gemayel and his uncle were forced to flee to Egypt after being sentenced to death in 1914 for opposing Ottoman rule, returning to Lebanon only at the end of World War I.

Gemayel was educated at Jesuit school. He went on to study pharmacy at the French faculty of medicine in Beirut, where he later opened a pharmacy. He owned a pharmacy in Haifa, British Mandatory Palestine. The pharmacy was located in Sahat Al Hanatir (Carriage Square).

=== In association football ===
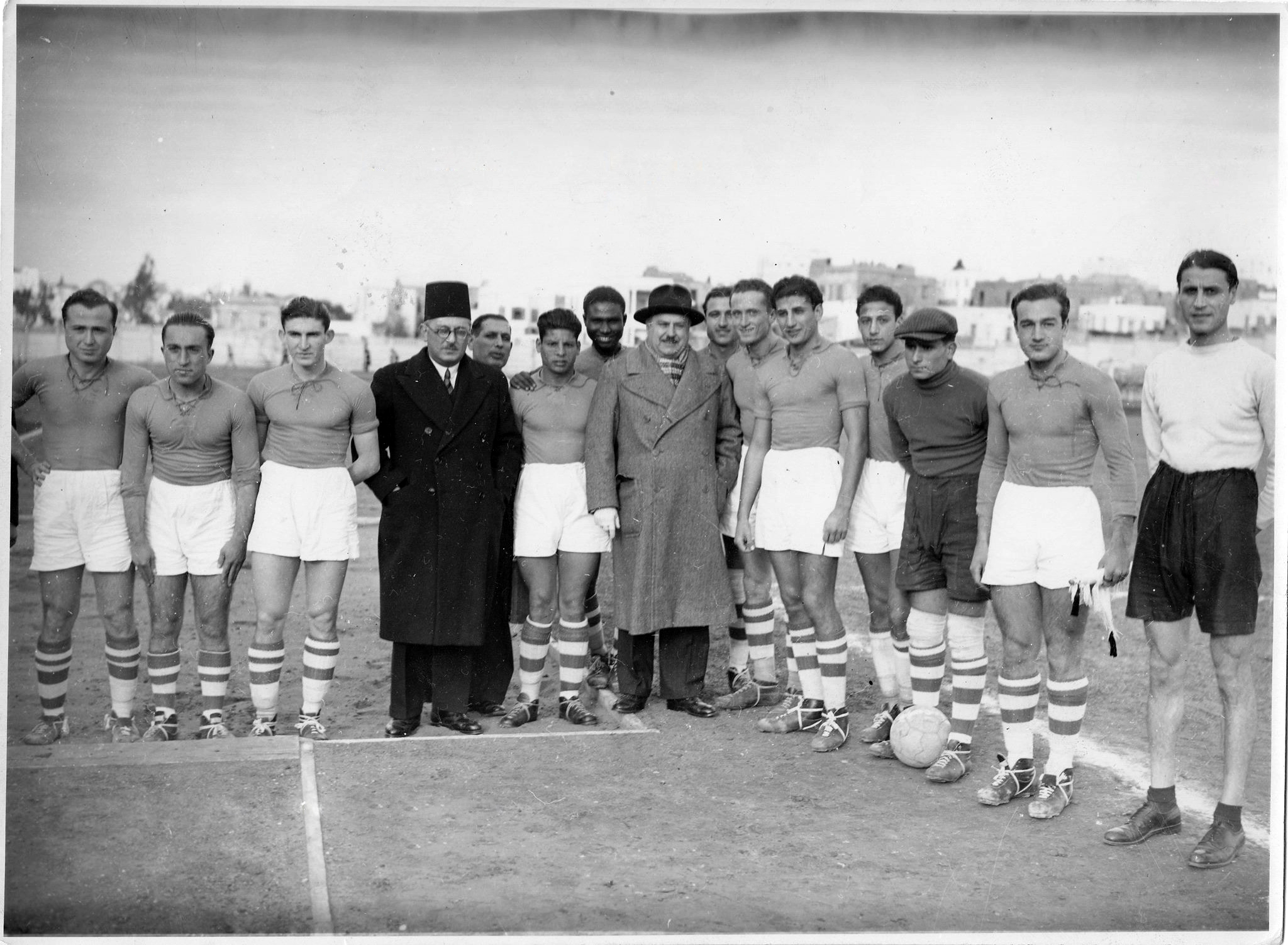
Pierre Gemayel (far right) prior to the friendly game in Beirut against Austrian club Admira Vienna in 1937

Gemayel also took an interest in sport, playing football. In 1935 he became president of the Lebanese Football Association (LFA); the same year he became Lebanon's first referee to officiate internationally. As captain of the Lebanon national team, Gemayel attended the 1936 Olympic games in Berlin, alongside Hussein Sejaan, the former LFA president. After the games, he also visited various Central European countries. Gemayel remained president of the LFA until 1939.

== Foundation of Kataeb Party ==
On his return to Lebanon from Europe, in 1936 Gemayel founded Al Kataeb Al Loubnaniyyah party (Kataeb Party) with Georges Naqqache, Charles Helou, Chafic Nassif and Hamid Franjieh, who was later replaced with Emile Yared, modelling the party after the Spanish and Italian Fascist parties he had observed there.

At first, the goal of the party was to enhance people's patriotism and civic-mindedness, but later on turned into a political resistance to the French authorities in the region. Gemayel was also influenced from the Sokol movement of Czechoslovakia during this visit to the Central Europe after the 1936 Olympic games, and employed the doctrine of this movement while founding the Kataeb party. Kataeb Party is described as a right-wing Christian Party.

The foundation of the Syrian Social Nationalist Party by Antun Saadeh in 1932 was the trigger for the establishment of the Kateb Party, since the former actively tried to influence Lebanon towards the Syrian interests, leading to direct challenge for Lebanese nationalists. The founders of the Kataeb Party were young, French-educated and middle-class professionals who committed to independent and Western-oriented Lebanon.

Charles Helou, who later served as Lebanon's president from 1964 to 1970, was one of the founders. By the time of his presidency, however, Helou was no longer a party member, and Gemayel unsuccessfully opposed him in the presidential election of 1964.

== Career ==
In the years before and after Lebanon's independence, Gemayel's influence and that of the Kataeb Party was limited. It survived a French attempt to forcibly dissolve it in 1937 and took part in an uprising against the French Mandate in 1943, but despite its membership of 35,000, it operated on the fringes of Lebanese politics.

In the Civil War of 1958, Gemayel emerged as a leader of the right-wing nationalist (mainly Christian) movement that opposed a Nasserist and Arab-nationalist inspired attempt to overthrow the government of president Camille Chamoun and supported the return of foreign troops to Lebanon. In the aftermath of the war, Gemayel was appointed a cabinet minister in a four-member Unity government. Two years later, Gemayel was elected to the National Assembly, from a Beirut constituency, a seat he held for the rest of his life. In 1958, Gemayel was appointed deputy to then prime minister Rashid Karami.

By the end of the 1960s, the Kataeb Party held 9 seats in the National Assembly, making it one of the largest groupings in Lebanon's notoriously fractured and sectarian parliament. Although his bids for the presidency in 1964 and 1970 were unsuccessful, Gemayel continued to hold cabinet posts intermittently throughout the remaining quarter-century of his life. For instance, he was minister of finance from 1960 to 1961 and in 1968, and the minister of public works in 1970.

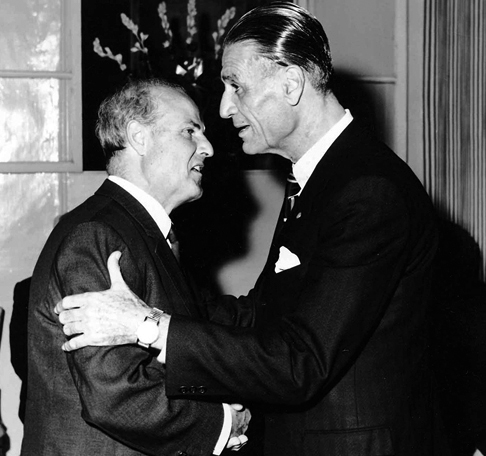
Pierre Gemayel (right) with William Hawi (left), Chief of the Kataeb Security Council

Lebanon has long been a battleground in the Israeli-Arab conflict, and Gemayel's position was always solid and consistent advocating a Lebanon separated from the other Arab states and linked to France and the West. He opposed the presence of the Palestinian refugees. His supporters viewed this as a sign of strength and patriotism, while his detractors saw it as incoherent.

Gemayel reluctantly signed the Cairo Agreement of 1969 under enormous pressure from the international community, which allowed Palestinian guerrillas to set up bases on Lebanese soil, from which to carry out actions against Israel. He later defended his actions, saying that Lebanon really had no choice. In the 1970s, he came to oppose the armed Palestinian presence in Lebanon. The Kataeb created a military Security Council led by William Hawi, which came to be commanded by Gemayel's son Bachir upon the assassination of Hawi.

Gemayel was also to reverse his position on the Syrian intervention in the Lebanese Civil War of 1975 to 1990. He initially welcomed Syrian intervention on the side of the Christians and against the Lebanese National Movement, but he soon became convinced that Syria was occupying Lebanon for reasons of its own.

In 1976, he joined other mainly Christian leaders, including former president Camille Chamoun, the diplomat Charles Malik, and the Guardians of the Cedars leader Étienne Saqr, to oppose the Syrians. On 11 October 1978, Gemayel bitterly denounced the Syrian military presence, and the Lebanese Front joined the Lebanese regular army in a successful "Hundred Days War" against the Syrian army.

On 4 June 1979, an attempt was made to assassinate Pierre Gemayel. The previous month, 13 May, Amine Gemayel also escaped an assassination attempt.

== Later years and death ==
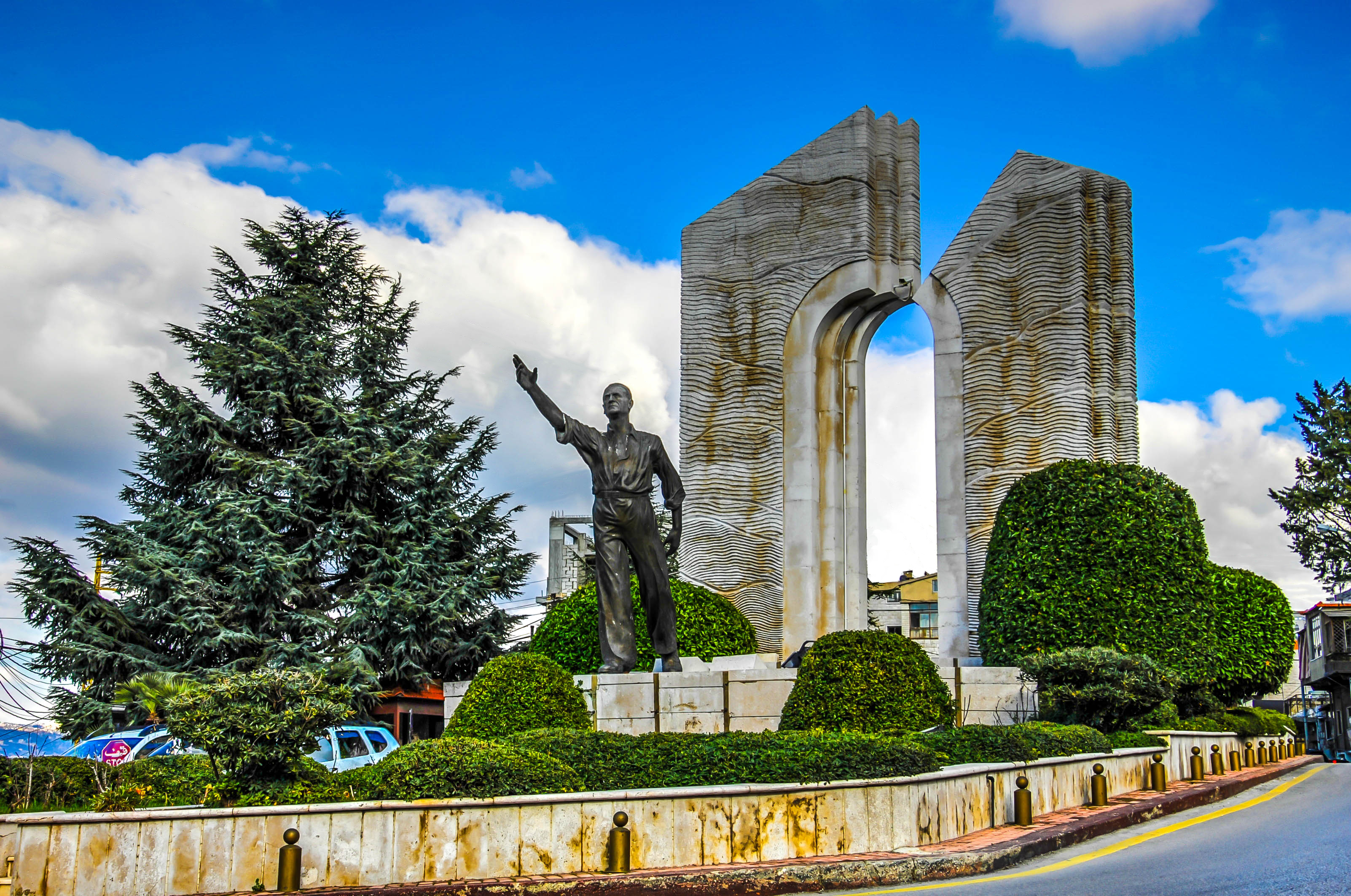
The Sheikh Pierre Gemayel Memorial, in Gemayel's hometown Bikfaya, Lebanon

Gemayel saw his younger son, Bachir Gemayel, elected president of Lebanon on 23 August 1982, only to be assassinated on 14 September, nine days before his scheduled inauguration. Bachir's older brother, Amine Gemayel was elected to replace him. Pierre Gemayel himself initially stayed out of Amine Gemayel's government, but in early 1984, after participating in two conferences in Geneva and Lausanne, Switzerland, aimed at ending the civil war and the occupation of the country by Israeli troops in 1982, he agreed to serve in a cabinet of national unity that was formed by Rashid Karami in May 1984. He served as the minister of public health and communications in the cabinet led by then prime minister Karami.

Gemayel was still in office when he died of a heart attack in Bikfaya on 29 August 1984. He was at the age of 78. Gemayel's body was buried next to Bachir Gemayel's grave in Bikfaya on 30 August 1984.

== Personal life ==
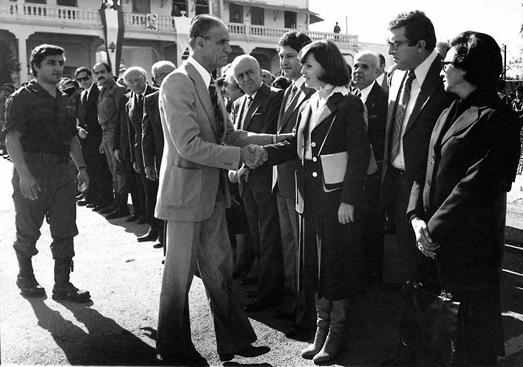
Bachir Gemayel with his father Pierre Gemayel and William Hawi's family at the Kataeb anniversary event in 1977

Gemayel was married to Genevieve Gemayel, and they celebrated the 50th anniversary of their marriage in August 1984. They had six children. His younger son, Bachir Gemayel was assassinated on 14 September 1982 after being elected to the presidency. His grandson Pierre Amine Gemayel, then industry minister, was similarly assassinated on 21 November 2006. Several other descendants of Pierre Gemayel, including two grandchildren, were also murdered during the civil war period.
