= Center for American and International Law =

International non-profit educational institution

The Center for American and International Law (formerly known as The Southwestern Legal Foundation, ') (CAIL) is an international nonprofit educational institution established in 1947 for lawyers, judges and law enforcement professionals located in Plano, Texas. CAIL also offers criminal justice programs and some other specialized programs.
