= Black Saturday (Lebanon) =

1975 massacre during the Lebanese Civil War

- Part of The Lebanese Civil War
- Location: 33°44′N 35°27′E; Beirut, Lebanon
- Date: 6 December 1975
- Target: Lebanese Muslims; Lebanese Druze
- Attack type: Massacre
- Deaths: 150-200
- Perpetrator: Kataeb Regulatory Forces
- Motive: Reprisal for the assassination of four young Christian Phalangists, on the Fanar road in Beirut, earlier that day.

Black Saturday (Arabic: السبت الأسود; French: Samedi noir) was the massacre of between 150 and 200 Lebanese Muslim and Druze civilians by Phalangist forces on Saturday 6 December 1975, during the early stages of the Lebanese Civil War. (Note: Haugbolle Sune, 25 Octobre, 2011, Historiography and memory of the Lebanese Civil War 1975-1990, https://www.sciencespo.fr/mass-violence-war-massacre-resistance/fr/document/historiography-and-memory-lebanese-civil-war. Quotation: "The first major incident was the Black Saturday massacre of 6 December 1975, when falangists killed between 150 (Chami 2003: 57) and 200 (Hanf 1993: 210) civilians in East Beirut.") (Note: Tamimova 2018 quotation: "checkpoints were erected across the city, resulting in the ID-based killing and kidnapping of about 200 individuals (Hanf 1993, p. 210), although the number remains disputed (Haugbolle 2011).") It set a precedent for later outbreaks of violence such as the Battle of the Hotels, the Karantina massacre and the Damour massacre.

The killings were led by Joseph Saade, a Phalangist whose son was killed in Fanar earlier that day along with three other young men while heading to a cinema in Brumana. The four young Christian men were found dead with axes and gunshots wounds on the Fanar road in Lebanon. Saade's first son was also murdered by Palestinian gunmen while participating in a rally paper in Beqaa earlier in 1975. The massacre accelerated the rapidly escalating civil war.
