= Lebanese Forces (militia) =

Lebanese Christian faction in the Lebanese Civil War

Lebanese Forces القوات اللبنانية
- Flag of the Lebanese Forces (1976–1994)
- Founder: Bachir Gemayel
- Leaders: Bachir Gemayel (1976–1982); Fadi Frem (1982–1984); Fouad Abou Nader (1984–1985); Elie Hobeika (1985–1986); Samir Geagea (1986–1994)
- Dates active: 1976–1994
- Headquarters: Military Council in Karantina, Beirut (until 1990); Ghidras, Keserwan District (until 1994)
- Active regions: East Beirut, Mount Lebanon, Beqaa Valley, Southern Lebanon
- Ideology: Lebanese nationalism Christian nationalism Conservatism; Anti-communism; Anti-pan-Arabism; Factions: Phalangism; Phoenicianism; Federalism
- Political position: Right-wing to far-right
- Status: Disarmed
- Size: 10,000
- Wars: Lebanese Civil War; Hundred Days' War; Battle of Zahleh; Battle of Qnat; 1982 Lebanon War; Siege of Beirut; Sabra-Shatila massacre; Battle of Bhamdoun; Mountain War; 1986 Lebanese Forces coup; War of Liberation; War of Elimination

The Lebanese Forces – LF (Arabic: القوات اللبنانية, romanized: al-Quwwāt al-Lubnāniyya), also known as Ouwet (lit. "Forces") for short or Forces Libanaises (FL) in French, was the main Lebanese Christian faction during the Lebanese Civil War. Resembling the Lebanese Front, which was an umbrella organization for different parties, the Lebanese Forces was a militia that integrated fighters originating from the different Christian right-wing paramilitary groups, the largest of which was the Kataeb Regulatory Forces. It was mainly staffed by Maronites and Christians of other denominations loyal to Bachir Gemayel, and fought against the Lebanese National Movement, the Palestine Liberation Organization, and the Syrian Armed Forces among others. The group gained infamy for the perpetration of the 1982 Sabra and Shatila massacre, which primarily targeted Palestinian refugees following Bachir Gemayel's assassination.

== Foundation ==
A meeting was convened by members of the Lebanese Front on 30 August 1976. The success of the Siege of Tal al-Zaatar being due to the combined forces of the Kataeb Regulatory Forces, Tigers Militia, Lebanese Youth Movement (MKG), Al-Tanzim, and the Guardians of the Cedars convinced the Lebanese Front leaders, especially Etienne Saqr and Bachir Gemayel, that a unitary militia was needed to further face their enemies. Most importantly, the militia leaders were wary of the increased Syrian presence. During this meeting, the Lebanese Forces would be founded with Bachir Gemayel elected as its leader. This new Lebanese Forces militia was meant to centralize the right-wing Christian forces, improve organization, and would allow to later bring end to years of infighting that had been going between the different right-wing militias.

== History ==
=== The LF Under Bachir Gemayel (1976–1982) ===
Following the escalation of the Lebanese Civil War, Christian militias in East Beirut and surrounding areas began coordinating their military efforts against Palestinian armed groups and allied Lebanese factions. After the Battle of Tel al-Zaatar in August 1976, leaders of several Christian militias agreed to create a unified military organization, creating the Lebanese Forces. This initiative was led by Bachir Gemayel, who worked with Fawzi Mahfouz, the leader of Al-Tanzim, to further the unification of the Christian militias that were involved in the battle.

In July 1978, fighting broke out between Syrian forces and Christian militias in Beirut, leading to the Hundred Days' War. The confrontation turned into a major conflict between Syria and the Lebanese Christian militias, with the latter seeking to preserve their military and political influence and resist Syrian influence in Lebanon.

==== Israeli invasion ====
In June 1982, Israel invaded Lebanon, arguing that a military intervention was necessary to root out PLO guerrillas from the southern part of the country. Israeli forces eventually moved towards Beirut and laid siege to the city, aiming to reshape the Lebanese political landscape and force the PLO out of Lebanon. The Israeli forces had demanded that Gemayel and the Lebanese Forces play a larger role in Israel’s invasion of Beirut however, Gemayel would refuse. In the end, the only action the Lebanese Forces would take during the Israeli invasion of Beirut would be the battle against the Syrian forces occupying the Lebanese University - Faculty of Science in Hadath. The Lebanese Forces would come out victorious successfully expelling the Syrian forces from the university.

After the PLO had been expelled from the country and moved its headquarters to Tunisia, in a negotiated agreement, Gemayel became the youngest man to ever be elected president of Lebanon. He was elected by the parliament in August; most Muslim members of parliament boycotted the vote.

On 3 September 1982, during the meeting, Menachem Begin demanded that Gemayel sign a peace treaty with Israel as soon as he took office in return for Israel's earlier support of Lebanese Forces and he also told Gemayel that the IDF would stay in South Lebanon if the Peace Treaty was not directly signed. Gemayel was furious with Begin and told him that the Lebanese Forces did not fight for seven years and did not sacrifice thousands of soldiers to free Lebanon from the Syrian Army and the PLO so that Israel could take their place. The meeting ended in rage and both sides were not happy with each other.

Begin was reportedly angry with Gemayel for his public denial of Israel's support. Gemayel refused to accept the offer of immediate peace by arguing that time was needed to reach a consensus with the Lebanese Muslims and the Arab nations. Gemayel was quoted telling David Kimche, the director general of the Israeli Foreign Ministry, a few days earlier, "Please tell your people to be patient. I am committed to make peace with Israel, and I shall do it. But I need time – nine months, maximum one year. I need to mend my fences with the Arab countries, especially with Saudi Arabia, so that Lebanon can once again play its central role in the economy of the Middle East."

In an attempt to fix the relationship between Gemayel and Begin, Ariel Sharon held a secret meeting with Gemayel in Bikfaya. In this meeting, they both agreed that, after 48 hours, the IDF would cooperate with the Lebanese Army in order to force the Syrian Army out of Lebanon. After that was done, the IDF would peacefully leave Lebanese territory. Concerning the Peace Negotiations, Sharon agreed to give Gemayel time to resolve the internal conflicts before signing the negotiations. The next day, Begin's office issued a statement which said that the issues which Gemayel and Sharon had agreed upon were accepted.

On 13 September 1982, LF chief of staff Fadi Frem, who was married to one of Gemayel’s nieces, would be elected commander in chief of the Lebanese Forces taking Gemayel’s place as the latter was expected to assume his term as president. Fadi Frem was a known advocate of federalism and went as far as to travel to the US to advocate for its implementation in Lebanon.

Nine days before he was to take office, on 14 September 1982, Gemayel was assassinated along with 25 others when a bomb exploded in the Kataeb headquarters in Achrafieh. The attack was carried out by Habib Shartouni, a member of the Syrian Social Nationalist Party (SSNP), believed by many to have acted on instructions of the Syrian government of President Hafez al-Assad. The next day, Israel moved to occupy the city, allowing Phalangist members under a young Elie Hobeika's command to enter the centrally located Sabra and the Shatila refugee camp; a massacre followed, in which Phalangists killed between 800 and 3,500 (number is disputed) civilians, mostly Palestinians and Lebanese Shiites, with many victims found raped and tortured. The massacre caused great international uproar, especially towards Sharon.

Gemayel’s assassination would demoralize the men of the Lebanese Forces who were sure that with Gemayel's election, peace would prevail throughout the country and that the victory was theirs. The Israeli invasion and their cooperation with the Lebanese government allowed many displaced Christians to return to areas they had previously been expelled from. These areas include the Druze majority mountain from where Christians had been expelled following the massacres that followed Kamal Jumblatt’s assassination by Syria. Other areas consist of the coastal Chouf, including the town of Damour, and southern villages, such as Aishiyeh.

=== Post-Bachir Gemayel Era (1982–1986) ===
==== Mountain War ====
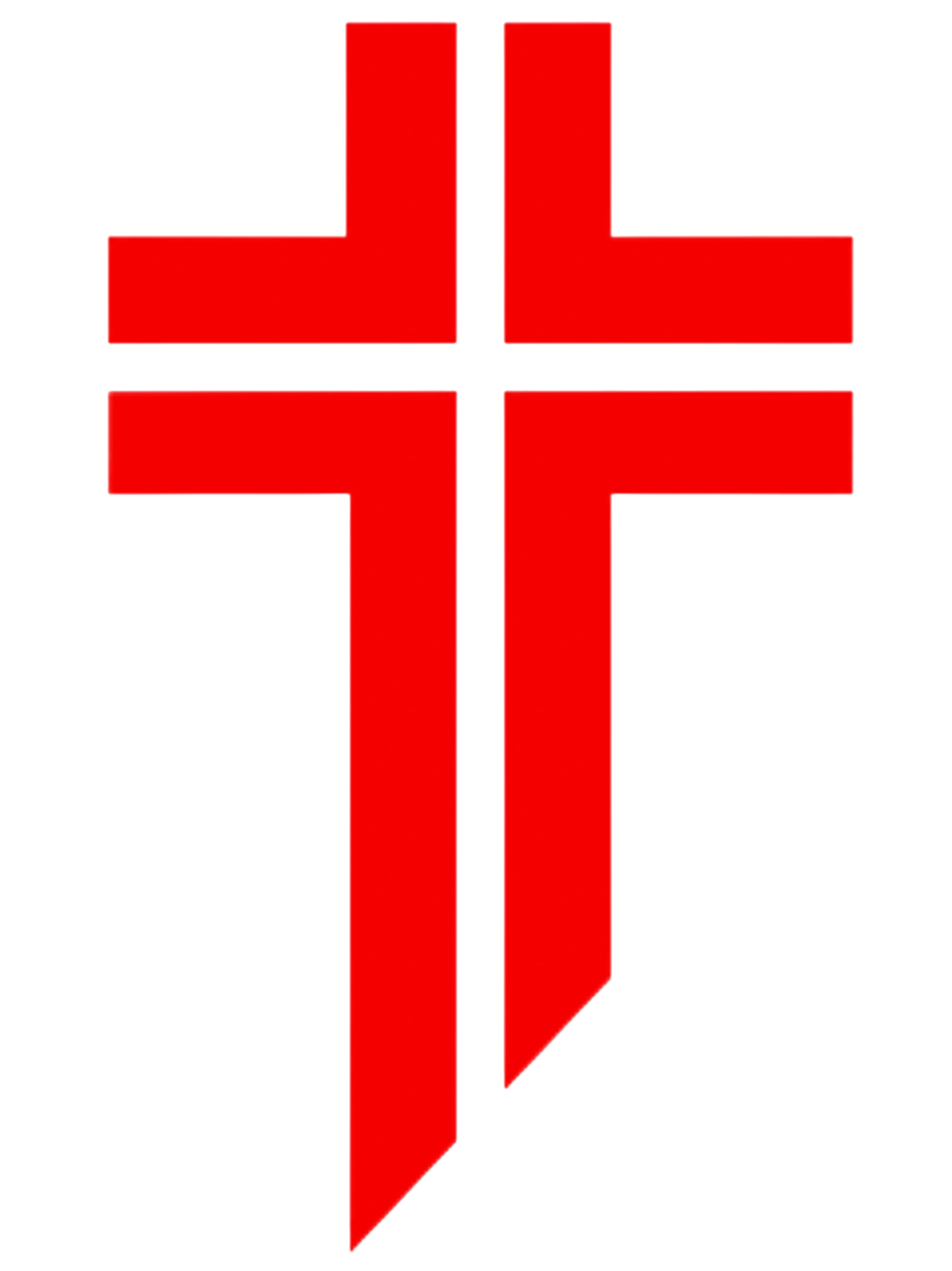
Lebanese Cross of Resistance logo, adopted in 1984 after the Mountain War

After the Israeli invasion, the IDF troops settled in the Chouf and Aley from party militias, the Lebanese Forces returned to the Christian villages which had been occupied by the PSP for seven years, and many Christian civilians from the districts returned after having fled earlier in the war. However, soon after, clashes broke out between the Lebanese Forces and the Druze militias, who had now taken over the districts and had earlier kicked out the Christian inhabitants. The main Druze militiamen came from the Progressive Socialist Party, led by Walid Jumblatt, in alliance with the Syrian Army and Palestinian militants who had not departed Lebanon in 1982. For months, the two fought what would later be known as the "Mountain War." At the peak of the battle, Israeli troops infamously abandoned the area, handing the best tactical positions over to the Druze militias and their allies as punishment for the Christians' refusal to sign the 17 May peace agreement with Israel, and leaving the Christian forces to fight. At the same time, a small number of ill-equipped Lebanese Forces troops also fought battles against the Palestinian and Druze militias and the Syrian troops east of the southern city of Sidon. The outcome was also a Progressive Socialist Party victory and a contiguous Druze Chouf district with access to Lebanese sea ports.

Jumblatt's militia then overstepped itself by advancing further into Souk El Gharb, a village also held by the Lebanese Forces. After fierce battles and severe casualties, the attackers were pushed back. However, the Lebanese Forces eventually handed over their positions in Souk El Gharb to the Lebanese army which had great interests in defending the town due to the strategic importance it holds for the army and the Lebanese government, as the town lies on the flanks of the Ministry of Defense and the Presidential Palace. After the retreat, the Lebanese Forces freed up more than 2,500 fighters, including elite units to fight on other fronts.

On 9 October 1984, Fadi Frem would be replaced as commander in chief by Gemayel’s nephew Fouad Abou Nader. His election was supported by Amin Gemayel, and the Kataeb, who sought to establish his influence over the Lebanese Forces. Fadi Frem and Amin Gemayel were in disagreement in regards to Syria as Amin was more reconciliatory while Frem was strict in his refusal to deal with the Syrians.

==== First Internal Lebanese Forces Uprising ====
On 12 March 1985, Samir Geagea, Elie Hobeika and Karim Pakradouni rebelled against Abou Nader's command, ostensibly to take the Lebanese Forces back to its original path and away from Amin Gemayel’s control. Leading up to the rebellion, President Amin Gemayel’s rapprochement with Damascus, as well as his treatment of the Lebanese Forces, had caused major dissatisfaction among the ranks of the Lebanese Forces which had been growing for years at that point. Amin Gemayel ordered Geagea to remove the Barbara checkpoint north of Beirut, which oversaw the passage between territory still under the control of the Lebanese government and territory occupied by the Syrian army. Geagea, who staunchly opposed Syria, would refuse, leading to the Kataeb political bureau’s decision to remove him from the party on 11 March. Commander in Chief at the time, Fouad Abou Nader, would agree to step down and give up his leadership to join the rebellion against President Gemayel and avoid violence between Christians. This uprising would see the installment of a "group command" over a single commander in chief. Geagea’s forces would arrive from the North facing absolutely no resistance. The relationship between Geagea and Hobeika soon broke down, however, and Hobeika began secret negotiations with the Syrians.

==== Battle of East Sidon and Withdrawal ====
On 18 March 1985, clashes began pitting the Palestinian militants and their local Lebanese Muslim allies against the local Christians in the villages of East Sidon caused by the kidnapping of three local Christians. The area which had been under the control Israelis saw the introduction of Lebanese Forces militants who installed themselves in the previously defenseless Christian villages that feared the same fate as Christians in the mountain two years earlier. This fear came reality as clashes began after Israeli forces withdrew from the city of Sidon on 16 February 1985. For the region this meant renewed fighting as the Israelis served as buffer between the local militias preventing them from fighting. The Lebanese Forces in the region, led by regional commander Nazar Najarian, had chosen to be loyal to the new Lebanese Forces management under Samir Geagea and Elie Hobeika in their fight for control of the leadership of the Christian community against Amine Gemayel. The LF led the battle against the PLO which was still present in South Lebanon as well as Nabih Berri’s Lebanese Shia militia, the Amal Movement and Walid Jumblatt’s Druze militia People’s Liberation Army (Lebanon). The battle would end with the withdrawal of the Lebanese Forces on 24 April as announced by Samir Geagea two days earlier. LF troops were allowed to leave for East Beirut by sea leaving from the port Jiyeh north of Sidon while others left for the Christian town of Jezzine where the South Lebanon Army was based. The Battle of East Sidon and its result saw the displacement of more than 60,000 Christians from the region.

==== The Tripartite Agreement And The Second Internal Lebanese Forces Uprising ====
On 28 December 1985, Elie Hobeika signed the Tripartite Accord, against the wishes of Geagea and most of the other leading Christian figures. Claiming that the Tripartite Accord gave Syria unlimited power in Lebanon, Geagea mobilized factions inside the Lebanese Forces and on 15 January 1986, attacked Hobeika's headquarters in Karantina. Hobeika surrendered and fled, first to Paris and subsequently to Damascus, Syria. He then moved to Zahlé with tens of his fighters where he prepared for an attack against East Beirut. On 27 September 1986, Hobeika's forces tried to take over the Achrafieh neighborhood of Beirut but the Lebanese Forces of Geagea's command held them back.

This failed attempt by Hobeika was the last episode of internal struggles in East Beirut during Amine Gemayel's mandate. As a result, the Lebanese Forces led by Geagea were the only major force on ground. During two years of frail peace, Geagea launched a drive to re-equip and reorganize the Lebanese Forces. He also instituted a social welfare program in areas controlled by Geagea's party. The Lebanese Forces also cut its relations with Israel and emphasized relations with the Arab states, mainly Iraq but also Saudi Arabia, Jordan, and Egypt.

=== The LF under Samir Geagea (1986–1994) ===
Two rival governments contended for recognition following Amine Gemayel's departure from the Presidency in September 1988, one a mainly Christian government and the other a government of Muslims and Lebanese Leftists. The Lebanese Forces initially supported the military Christian government led by Gen. Michel Aoun, the commander of the Lebanese Army. However, clashes erupted between the Lebanese Forces and the Lebanese Army under the control of Michel Aoun on 14 February 1989. These clashes were stopped, and after a meeting in Bkerké, the Lebanese Forces handed the national ports which it controlled to Aoun's government under pressure from the Lebanese National Army.

Geagea initially supported Aoun's "Liberation War" against the Syrian army, but then agreed to the Taif Agreement, which was signed by the Lebanese deputies on 24 October 1989 in Saudi Arabia and demanded an immediate ceasefire. Aoun's main objection to the Taif Agreement was its vagueness as to Syrian withdrawal from the country. He rejected it vowing that he "would not sign over the country." Fierce fighting in East Beirut broke out between the two, called the "Elimination War" on 31 January 1990.

=== Territory Handover to the LAF ===
On 1 April 1990, following an agreement between Geagea and Hrawi, General Elie Hayek (who had been appointed commander of the Mount Lebanon governorate two weeks prior) was mandated by the executive to begin the transfer of military and political administrations in the Christian enclave from the LF to the West Beirut government. The territories in the Christian North Governorate and East Beirut would remain under complete LF control, in addition to the 30000 reservist 10000 active men strong militia remain intact for the moment. In response, Aoun announced that he would not accept any alliance between the two, and transferring the regions of the Metn was thus impossible due to the raging Elimination War. To further demonstrate his commitment to Taif and willingness to extend civilian administration in "Marounistan", Geagea placed Hayek's bureau at the LF HQ in Jounieh.

Following the defeat and surrender of Aoun at Baabda on 13 October 1990, the LAF under Hayek's command began extending its influence South into the Metn and Baabda. On 30 April 1991 – final date imposed by the government for the total surrender of weapons and heavy artillery – all LF areas were ceded to the army command for the first time since 1975.

=== The Second Republic (1990–2005) ===
After Aoun surrendered on 13 October 1990 to the rival Syrian-backed President Hrawi, Geagea was offered ministerial posts in the new government. He refused several times, because he was opposed to Syrian interference in Lebanese affairs, and his relationship with the new government deteriorated. On 23 March 1994, the Lebanese government headed by Rafic Hariri ordered the dissolution of the LF. On 21 April 1994, Geagea was arrested on charges of setting a bomb in a church at Zouk Mikael, of instigating acts of violence, and of committing assassinations during the Lebanese Civil War. Although he was acquitted of the first charge, Geagea was subsequently arrested and sentenced to life imprisonment on several different counts, including the assassination of former Prime Minister Rashid Karami in 1987. He was incarcerated in solitary confinement, with his access to the outside world severely restricted. Amnesty International criticized the conduct of the trials and demanded Geagea's release, and Geagea's supporters argued that the Syrian-controlled Lebanese government had used the alleged crimes as a pretext for jailing Geagea and banning an anti-Syrian party. Many members of the Lebanese Forces were arrested and brutally tortured in the period of 1993–1994. At least one died in Syrian custody and many others were severely injured.

== Military structure ==
=== Command ===
Initially allocated at the Kataeb Party's offices in Achrafieh, the LF Headquarters was relocated in August 1976 by Bachir Gemayel to an abandoned hospital at the Karantina neighborhood located east of the Port of Beirut, where it stayed until 1986, before being moved to its final location at the coastal town of Amsheet.

=== Early field organization 1977–1985 ===
By the early 1980s, the LF command had built up a force of some 15,000 well-armed militiamen, and claimed that they could mobilize a total Christian army of 40,000, complete with Israeli-supplied tanks and artillery.

=== Late war and post-war field organization 1986–1994 ===
LF ground forces' strength by the late 1980s peaked at 14,500 full-time regulars (although other sources list a slightly higher number, about 15,000) and 30,000 part-time reservists, totalling 44,500 men and women equipped with an impressive though disparate arsenal of 100 tanks, 200 APCs and 150 artillery pieces of various types.

=== Branches of Service ===
The LF was structured along conventional lines, comprising several branches of service and support units, most of them inherited from the old Kataeb Regulatory Forces. Specialized technical services consisted of:

- Infantry Corps (Arabic: Silah al-Moushat)
- Armoured Corps (Arabic: Silah al-Moudara'a)
- Tank Corps (Arabic: Fourousiya)
- Artillery Corps (Arabic: Silah al-Madfa'aiya) – the LF artillery branch, formed in 1977.
- Signal Corps (Arabic: Silah al-Ichara)
- Naval Units (Arabic: Silah al-Bahriya) – the LF naval service, established in 1978, being employed as a shock force for military operations and equipped with over a dozen sea crafts of various types.
- Women Corps (Arabic: Nizamyyat)
- Military Engineering Corps (Arabic: Handassa Askariya or Silah al-Handassa) – the LF engineering branch, formed in 1981.
- Logistics Corps (Arabic: Daeem)
- Rescue Service (Arabic: Wahadat al-Isa'af) – the LF medical support and casualty evacuation unit, established in 1981.
- Military Police (Arabic: Shorta al-A'askariya) – the LF regular provost corps, created in 1980 out of the earlier SKS security companies of the Kataeb Regulatory Forces. They wore a red left sleeve brassard with white MP letters and a red circumferential band around their helmets with white MP letters superimposed on the front. Military policemen also wore white pistol belts and holsters.

=== Elite units ===
- Snow Units (Arabic: Silah al-Tazalouj) – the LF Mountain troops' corps, specialized in Mountain warfare.
- LF Marines – an Israeli-trained naval infantry unit specialized in seaborne infiltration, amphibious warfare and reconnaissance (Ranger) operations. The Marines also operated in conjunction with the LF Naval Service over a dozen small watercraft. They wore light blue berets.
- Force Sadem or Strike Force and Shock unit (Arabic: Wahadat al-Sadm) – a hand-picked company-sized para-commando formation, one of the few units in the region capable of conducting sea, air and land operations. The unit was known to be the best trained and one of the most elite unit during the war. Known for their hard training, and the 40 days of hell when they were isolated in the wild for 40 days without any provisions. They were trained by a US Army green beret. And participated in training by the US, Britain, France, and Jordan. At the beginning in 1986 they consisted of 11 men, then they tried to expand the unit, thousands of men participated in the training, they only managed to expand it to 30/40 men. Wore a red beret.
- 101st Parachute Unit or 101st Parachute Company (Arabic: Wahadat al-Mazaliyin) – a company-sized airborne-qualified Ranger unit formed in 1984, whose members underwent jump-training in Israel and the United States.
- Special Force Unit 77 (Arabic: Wahdat al-Quwwat al-Khasat Sabeat wa Sabeun) or Battalion 77 (Arabic: Katibat Sabeat wa Sabein) – a battalion-sized light infantry unit formed in 1982–1984.
- Adonis Defense Units (Arabic: Wahadat al-Difa'a 'Adonis) – a battalion-sized Commando unit formed in 1980-1981, notable for being among the first to integrate female combatants into dedicated commando training sessions.
- Defense Brigade (Arabic: Liwa al-Difa'a) – regimental-sized mechanized infantry unit set up in 1990, which consisted of the 61st, 62nd and 63rd battalions. The brigade was never brought to strength, since only the former two battalions were constituted and the third one was not even raised prior to the unit's disbandement in 1991.
- Commandos (Arabic: al-Maghaweer) – several conventionally-structured special operations units existed.
- Itbaani or Itbaeni – Commando unit specialized in anti-tank warfare and anti-aircraft defense.
- LF Frogmen – Combat Swimmer Unit and Maritime Special Operations Force attached to the LF marines, which consisted of 100 men and modelled after the US Navy SEALs.
- Damouri Brigade (Arabic: Liwa' al-Dumuri) – battalion-sized infantry unit, created in October 1980 from former Tigers Militia fighters.

=== Intelligence and security ===
- Civil Police (Arabic: Shorta al-Madaniyya)
- Security Agency (Arabic: Jihaz al-Aman) – the LF counter-espionnage and military intelligence service, established in 1978.

== List of LF commanders ==
=== LF supreme commanders ===
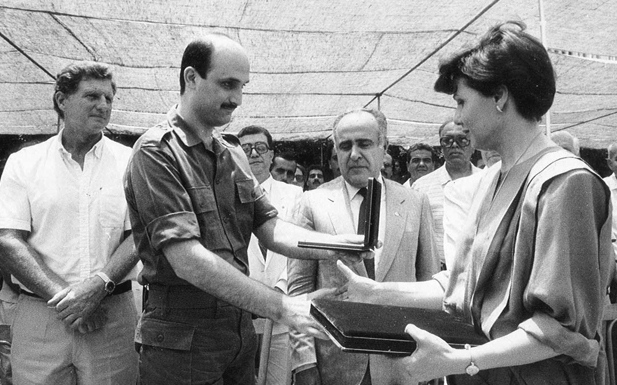
LF Supreme Commander Samir Geagea (center) with Dany Chamoun of the NLP (left) and Leila Hawi (right), east Beirut, late 1980s.

- Bachir Gemayel (1976–1982)
- Fadi Frem (1982–1984)
- Fouad Abou Nader (1984–1985)
- Elie Hobeika (1985–1986)
- Samir Geagea (1986–1994)

=== LF chiefs-of-staff ===
- George Freiha – Chief-of-Staff to Bachir Gemayel.
- Fadi Frem (1980–1982)
- Fouad Abou Nader (1982–1984)
- Elias Zayek (1984–1985)
- Samir Geagea (1985–1987)
- General Fouad Malek (1987–1994)

=== Heads of the Gamma Group ===
- Raymond Arab (1978–1981)
- Najib Fayad (1981–1984)

=== Advisers to LF supreme commanders ===
- Karim Pakradouni (1983–1984)
- Najib Fayad (1984–1985)

=== LF junior commanders ===
- Akram Kozah – 2nd commander of the SADM unit.
- Alex Mteini
- Antoine Bridi (a.k.a. 'Toto')
- Assaad Chaftari (a.k.a. 'Asso') – LF intelligence chief.
- Assaad Said – Deputy Chief-of-Staff for Logistics (1980).
- Raji Abdo (a.k.a. 'Captain')
- Pierre Rizk (a.k.a. 'Akram')
- Pierre Jabbour – 3rd commander of the SADM unit.
- Boutros Khawand
- Elias Khoury
- Elias Zayek
- Hanna Atik (a.k.a. 'Hanoun') – Founder and commander of the SADM unit.
- Kayrouz Baraket – Commander of the LF infantry and Special Forces.
- Joseph Abou Fadel - Field Commander of the LF in the Matn District.
- Joseph Eddeh (a.k.a. 'Joe' Eddeh)
- Joseph Elias
- Jocelyne Khoueiry – Commander of the LF Women Corps.
- Massoud Achkar (a.k.a. 'Poussy' Achkar) – Field Commander of the LF in Achrafieh, Beirut.
- Nader Succar
- Naji Butrus – Field Commander of the LF in Ain El Remmaneh, Beirut.
- Raymond Assayan
- Robert Hatem (a.k.a. 'Cobra')
- Sami Khoueiry
- Salim Meayki – Head of the LF Civil Police and Director of the LF military academy, the Bachir Gemayel Institute.
- Sleiman Sawaya
- Suhail Menassa
- Paul Andari – LF Deputy Field Commander of the Mountain District.
- Paul Gemayel
- Ibrahim Daher
- Ibrahim Haddad

== Training facilities ==
=== Military Academy ===
To train LF officer cadets, a Military Academy, later renamed the Bachir Gemayel Institute (Arabic: Maehad Bachir Gemayel), was set up in 1985 at a disused Maronite monastery in the town of Ghosta, located 20 km east of Beirut in the Keserwan District.

== Weapons and equipment ==
The Lebanese Forces were financed, trained and armed mainly by Israel, though they also received covert military support from France, the United States, United Kingdom, South Africa, Jordan and Iraq. In addition to aid from the Israelis, the LF purchased a large part of their military supplies on the international black market, and also made use of captured stocks from the Palestine Liberation Organization (PLO), the Syrian Army and even the Lebanese Army.

=== Infantry weapons ===
Lebanese Forces's militiamen were provided with a variety of small-arms, comprising M1 Garand (or its Italian-produced copy, the Beretta Model 1952) and SKS semi-automatic rifles, plus MAT-49, Škorpion vz. 61, Carl Gustaf m/45 (or its Egyptian-produced version, dubbed the "Port Said"), Walther MPL, Sterling L2A3/Mark 4, Spectre M4, Uzi (MP-2, Mini Uzi and Micro Uzi variants), MAC-10, MAC-11 (sub-compact version of the MAC-10), Heckler & Koch MP5 and Heckler & Koch MP5K (shortened version of the MP5) submachine guns. An undisclosed number of OTs-02 Kiparis SMGs were reportedly obtained from Russia in the early 1990s, though it remains unclear if they were ever used in action by the LF.

Several models of assault rifles were employed, such as M16A1, FN FAL (variants included the Israeli-produced 'lightened' ROMAT), Heckler & Koch G3, Vz. 58, AK-47 and AKM (other variants included the Zastava M70, Chinese Type 56, Romanian Pistol Mitralieră model 1963/1965, Bulgarian AKK/AKKS and former East German MPi-KMS-72 assault rifles). Limited quantities of the AMD-65, CAR-15 and SIG SG 543 carbines, M16A2, SIG SG 542, FN CAL, Heckler & Koch HK33, Heckler & Koch G41, Heckler & Koch HK53 (Compact version of the HK33) and ArmaLite AR-18 assault rifles were also acquired, being mostly employed by LF elite commando units on special operations. Inevitably, this variety of assault rifles and carbines of different calibers in service within LF combat units naturally caused logistic difficulties to the LF's supply corps, so the LF Command decided after 1986 to simplify its small-arms inventory by standardizing on the FN FAL, M16A1, and AKM assault rifles for its infantry units, though this still posed problems in providing ammunition and replacement parts up to the end of the War.

Shotguns consisted of Mossberg 500 12-gauge (20.2 mm), Remington Model 870 Police Magnum 12-gauge (20.2 mm), and Franchi SPAS-12 and Franchi SPAS-15 semi-automatic models. Sniper rifles were commonly used, and models included the Dragunov SVD-63, Tabuk, M21, Remington Model 700, Savage 10FP/110FP, Enfield L42A1 (military version) and Enforcer (Police version) rifles, and the Heckler & Koch PSG1.

A wide variety of handguns models were used, including Smith & Wesson Model 10, Smith & Wesson Model 13, Smith & Wesson Model 14, Smith & Wesson Model 15, Smith & Wesson Model 17 and Smith & Wesson Model 19 revolvers, Mauser M2 semi-automatic handguns, Walther PPK pistols, Heckler & Koch VP70, Heckler & Koch P7 and Heckler & Koch P9 pistols, SIG P210, SIG-Sauer P220 and SIG-Sauer P225 pistols, Astra A-80, Astra A-90 and Astra A-100 pistols, Llama M82 pistols, Star 30M, and Star A, B, B Super and P pistols, Star Ultrastar, Star Firestar and Star Megastar pistols, Taurus PT92, PT99 and PT100 pistols, Beretta M1951 pistols, MAB PA-15 pistols, Colt M1911A1 Semi-Automatic Pistols, Para-Ordnance P14-45 (Canadian-produced version of the M1911A1 pistol), FN Browning Hi-Power pistols, FN Browning BDM pistols, FN Browning BDA380 pistols, FN Browning HP-DA/BDA9 pistols, Tokarev TT-33 pistols, Makarov PM/PMM pistols, and CZ 52, CZ 75, CZ 82/83 and CZ 85 pistols.

Squad weapons consisted of Rheinmetall MG 3, Heckler & Koch HK21, AA-52, RPK, RPD, PK/PKM, M60 and FN MAG light machine guns, with heavier Browning M1919A4 .30 Cal, Browning M2HB .50 Cal, SG-43/SGM Goryunov and DShKM machine guns being employed as platoon and company weapons.

Grenade launchers and portable anti-tank weapons were also widely employed, including M203 grenade launchers, CMS B-300 83 mm, M72 LAW, RPG-7 and M47 Dragon anti-tank rocket launchers. Anti-tank guided missile systems comprised the MILAN (75 missiles and nine launchers were allegedly obtained through South African sources), the BGM-71 TOW (seized from Lebanese Army stocks) and the AT-3 Sagger. Crew-served and indirect fire weapons included M224 60 mm, M29 81 mm, Type E1 51 mm and 2B14-1 Podnos 82 mm light mortars, plus M2 Carl Gustaf 84 mm, SPG-9 73 mm, B-10 82 mm, B-11 107 mm and M40A1 106 mm recoilless rifles (often mounted on technicals).

=== Armoured vehicles ===
The Lebanese Forces' early armoured corps in 1977 inherited a motley collection of captured light tanks, Charioteer tanks, M42A1 Duster SPAAGs, APCs, and some models of homebuilt armoured cars from the old Kataeb Regulatory Forces or handed over by the other, recently incorporated Christian factions. Thanks to the steady influx of Israeli aid, it grew from a small battalion to a powerful armoured corps by June 1982, capable of aligning some forty M50 Super Sherman medium tanks, twenty-two Ti-67 TIRAN (Israeli-modified T-54/55s) MBTs (other sources list a total of either thirty-six or forty Ti-67s on the LF inventory), M3/M9 Zahlam half-tracks, M113 and BTR-152 APCs. In addition, twenty T-54/55 tanks were later captured from the Syrian Army in the course of the 1982 Lebanon War, being repaired and subsequently taken into LF service. Following the PLO's withdrawal from west Beirut in October 1982, the LF salvaged seven UR-416 armoured cars left behind by the departing Palestinian forces, from which one vehicle was later captured by the Popular Nasserist Organization (PNO) militia during the battle for the Sidon bridgehead in 1985.

The collapse of the Lebanese Army's 4th Infantry Brigade in February 1984 allowed the LF to make up for their own losses incurred in the 1983–84 Mountain War by seizing seven M48A5 MBTs, five AMX-13 light tanks, twelve Panhard AML-90 armoured cars, and some M113 APCs. Later in the war, sixty-four T-54A, T-55A and T-62 tanks, along with fifty M113 APCs modified as mortar carriers (captured from the Islamic Republic of Iran Army during the Iran–Iraq War) and eighteen BTR-60PB (8x8) APCs were received from Iraq via Jordan in 1986–89; a few M577 command vehicles, AMX-VCI and Panhard M3 VTT armoured personnel carriers were also seized from the Lebanese Army in 1990. The LF also fielded three Soviet-built ZSU-23-4M1 Shilka SPAAGs captured from the PLO in West Beirut early in 1982, which they employed in their battles for control of east Beirut during the Elimination War in January–October 1990.

=== Transport, liaison, and recovery vehicles ===
Besides tracked and wheeled AFVs, the LF also relied on a wide range of softskin, all-terrain military and 'militarized' civilian vehicles for both troop and supply transport. Like many other Lebanese militias, the LF continued to field a sizable force of gun trucks and technicals armed with Heavy Machine-guns, recoilless rifles, Anti-Aircraft autocannons, anti-tank rockets and light MBRLs. The light vehicles employed in this role included Soviet UAZ-469, US M151A1/A2 jeeps, US Willys M38A1 MD and South Korean Kia KM410 and Keohwa KH-5GA1 jeeps, to Land Rover Series II-III, Santana Series III (Spanish-produced version of the Land-Rover series III), Morattab Series IV (Iranian-produced unlicensed version of the Land-Rover long wheelbase series III), Toyota Land Cruiser (J40/J42), Chevrolet C-10/C-15 Cheyenne and Chevrolet C-20 Scottsdale light pickup trucks, Dodge D series (3rd generation) and Dodge Power Wagon W200 pickup trucks, Israeli-produced AIL M325 Command Cars ('Nun-Nun'), and Mercedes-Benz Unimog 404 and 416 light trucks (captured from the PLO in 1982).

For logistical support, pickups and light, medium and heavy transportation trucks were employed, mostly Toyota Land Cruiser (J42) hardtop, Toyota Land Cruiser (J45), Toyota Land Cruiser (J70) hardtop, AIL M325, M880/M890 Series CUCV, Chevrolet C-20, and Datsun 620 Custom 1976 pickup trucks, Unimog light trucks, GAZ-66, Chevrolet C-50 medium-duty, Dodge F600 medium-duty and GMC C4500 medium-duty trucks, and GMC C7500 heavy-duty cargo trucks, US M35A2 2½-ton (6x6) military trucks, M813 5-ton (6x6) cargo trucks and Faun L912/21-MUN heavy cargo trucks. In addition, AIL M325 ambulance version cars, Chevrolet/GMC G-Series third generation vans, Volkswagen Type 2 Transporter minibuses and Nissan Patrol 160-Series (3rd generation) 5-door wagon/vans were used as military ambulances. The Israelis also provided to the LF a number of M88A1 medium recovery vehicles, which served alongside some M578 light recovery vehicles seized from the Lebanese Army and captured VT-55KS Armoured Recovery Vehicles from the Syrian Army. Ratrack dual track snow coaches were employed by the LF in the snowy environment of Mount Lebanon mountains. The LF fielded three ex-US Army XM523E2 Heavy Equipment Transporters (HET) to transport its medium tanks and MBTs.

=== Artillery ===
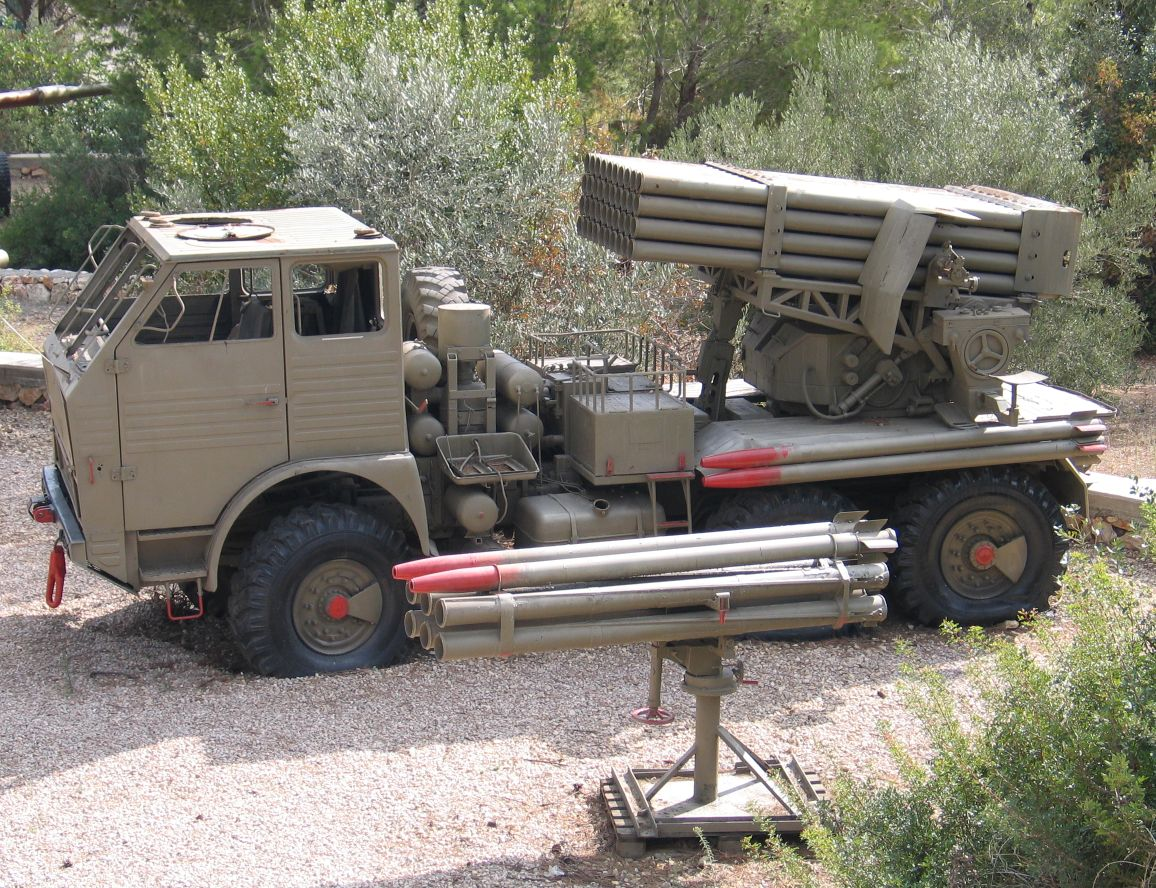
An ex-Lebanese Forces militia APR-40/RO-40 128mm 6-tube multiple rocket launcher mounted on a DAC chassis on static display at the Beyt ha-Totchan Museum, Zikhron Ya'akov, Israel.

The LF also fielded an impressive artillery corps. Starting with some British QF Mk III 25-Pounder field guns seized from the Government Forces, they received four French DEFA D921/GT-2 90mm anti-tank guns (mounted on M3/M9 half tracks), ZiS-3 76.2mm anti-tank guns (mounted on GAZ-66 trucks) and BF-50 (M-50) 155mm Howitzers and M-30 122mm (M-1938) Howitzers from the Israelis, followed in the 1980s by D-44 85 mm anti-tank guns, M-46 130mm (M-1954), Type 59-1 130 mm (a Chinese-made gun derivered from the Soviet M-46), eighteen BS-3 100mm (M-1944), eighteen D-30 122 mm (some re-mounted on turretless T-54 tanks) and D-20 152 mm Howitzers of Soviet origin supplied by Israel, Jordan and Iraq. A number of FH-70 155 mm howitzers were also seized from the Lebanese Army in February 1984.

The two latter Countries also provided to the LF substantial quantities of Multi-Barrel Rocket Launchers (MBRLs), notably the BM-21 Grad 122 mm system mounted on Russian Ural-375D (6x6) military trucks (of which eighteen were delivered by Iraq); such MBRLs could also be found installed on the back of Mercedes-Benz Unimog 406 (4x4) light trucks. The LF also employed Chinese Type 63 107 mm towed MBRLs captured from the PLO in 1982 (with some being re-installed on the rear tray of South Korean Keohwa M-5GA1 Jeeps, Israeli-made 'Nun-Nun' Command cars, and on turretless T-54 tanks) as well as Iraqi-supplied Romanian APR-40/Yugoslav RO-40 128mm systems mounted on DAC-665T (6x6) trucks. Iraq also provided a small number of Frog-7 short-range artillery rockets mounted on wheeled 9P113 transporter erector launchers (TEL).

These same countries also gave the LF limited quantities of heavy mortars, such as the Israeli-made Soltam M-65 120 mm and M-66 160 mm heavy mortars mounted on ex-IDF half-tracks and modified M113 APCs, and even received from Iraq in 1988 three Soviet 2S4 240mm towed breech-loading heavy mortars, to which were added one or two Chinese-manufactured 240mm mortars the LF had captured in 1982 following the Israeli invasion.

Soviet KPV 14.5mm, ZPU (ZPU-1, ZPU-2, ZPU-4) 14.5mm and ZU-23-2 23mm AA autocannons, British Bofors 40mm L/60 anti-aircraft guns and Soviet AZP S-60 57 mm anti-aircraft guns (mostly mounted on technicals, M113 and BTR-152 APCs and M3/M9 half-tracks) were employed in both air defense and direct fire supporting roles. Man-portable, shoulder-launched Soviet SA-7 Grail surface-to-air missiles (SAM) were also used by the LF, possibly obtained from Iraq.

=== Sea craft ===
Apart from its ground forces, the LF maintained a naval branch equipped with over a dozen sea crafts of various types. The inventory comprized two British-made Fairey Marine Tracker MkII Class patrol boats previously seized from the Lebanese Navy in January 1980, two Israeli-made Dvora-class fast patrol boats and five Dabur-1 class patrol boats acquired via the Mossad that same year and eight French-made Zodiac rubber inflatable boats, plus an unspecified number of converted civilian fishing crafts armed with Heavy machine-guns and RPG-7s.

=== Aircraft ===
In the late 1980s, the LF Command made plans to raise an air wing equipped mainly with light attack helicopters. Several student pilots were sent to Iraq and other countries to attend helicopter pilot courses, and later on the LF received from Iraq three Aérospatiale SA 342L Gazelle helicopter gunships. The program was eventually interrupted, then canceled when the Elimination War broke out in January 1990. It is not clear if any of the Gazelles were actually delivered by the Iraqis prior to the end of the civil war in October 1990, although it has been reported that the LF illegally sold three helicopters of this same type to Serbia in 1991.

== Uniforms and insignia ==
=== Fatigue clothing ===
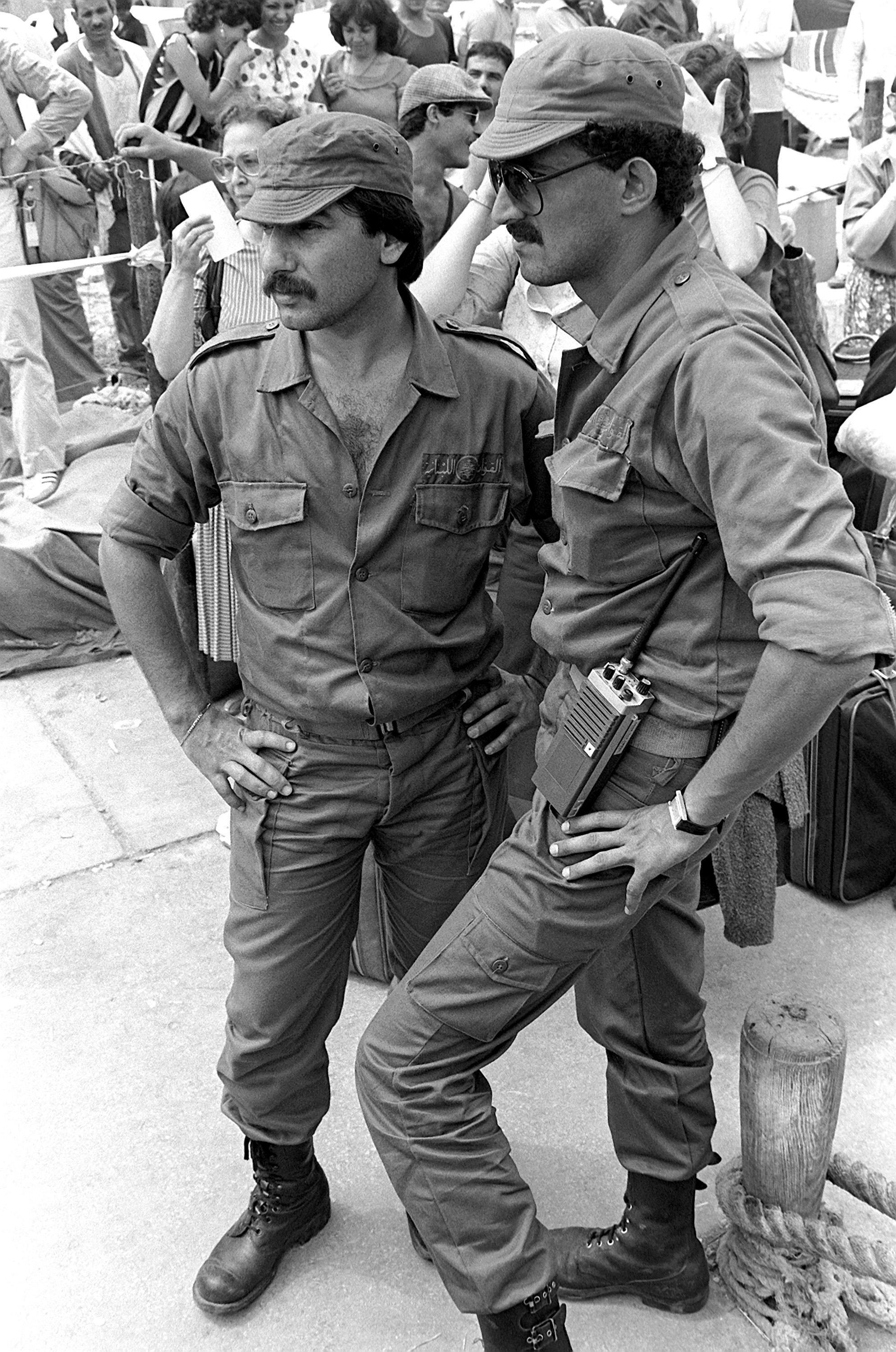
Two Lebanese Forces militiamen wearing Israeli olive drab Uniform "B" fatigues and IDF "Old style" fatigue caps assist in the evacuation of foreign nationals at the port of Jounieh, June 24, 1982.

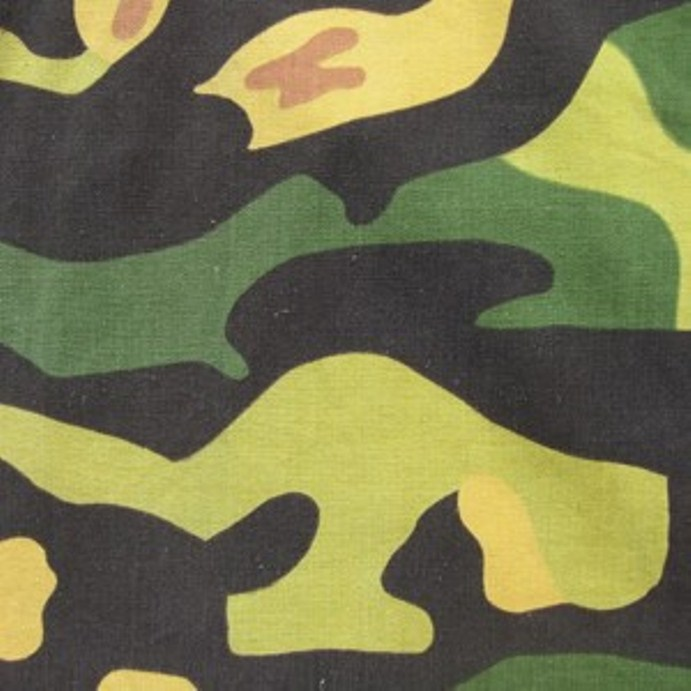
Lebanese Forces Czechoslovak Vz 60 "Salamander" (Mlok) pattern.

Like the other Lebanese Front militias, the LF retained the Lebanese Army olive green fatigues (a special domestic variant of the U.S. Army OG-107 cotton sateen utilities) as their standard field dress, but in the late 1970's it began to be replaced by the IDF olive drab (OD) Uniform "B" (Hebrew: Madei Bet) cotton fatigues provided by Israel, which eventually became the militia's standard service, combat and work uniform. Nevertheless, period photos show that the early ex-Lebanese Army OG fatigues and the newly-received Israeli OD uniforms were worn interchangeably by LF personnel until 1982. Surplus Olive Green U.S. Army M1967 Jungle Utility Uniforms were worn by some LF officers, whilst U.S. Army OG-107 cotton sateen utilities' trousers and OG-106 Nomex two-piece flying suits were a common affection among members of LF elite units, such as the Marines.

Camouflage uniforms consisted of "Duck Hunter" and "Waves" (or "Swirl") patterns fatigues of South Korean origin, Czechoslovak Vz 60 "Salamander" (Mlok) pattern fatigues, Syrian or captured PLO Lizard horizontal and vertical patterns' fatigues, Vietnam War-era Tigerstripe (Tadpole Sparse) pattern fatigues, Iraqi Highland pattern (a.k.a. "Iraqi Woodland") fatigues, Italian M1929 Telo mimetico fatigues, Syrian copies of the Pakistani Arid Brushstroke (nicknamed "Wisp") fatigues, U.S. Woodland Battle Dress Uniforms (BDU) captured from the Lebanese Army or locally produced cheap copies, and commercial "Jigsaw" (or "Puzzle") pattern rain jackets of Belgian or French origin.

Olive Green US M-1965 field jackets (either taken from Lebanese Army stocks or provided as aid by Israel) and OG IDF Dubon Parkas, and even ex-PLO Iraqi copies of the olive-brown woollen Jordanian Commando Sweater (a.k.a. 'woolly-pully') provided with breast pockets and shoulder straps, plus several other types of civilian and military sweaters and pullovers, were worn in cold weather. LF mountain troops were issued two-piece white snowsuits while operating in the snow-covered mountains of Mount Lebanon during the winter months.

=== Headgear ===
Standard headgear for all-ranks was a military beret of French pattern, made of wool in one piece attached to a black leather rim with two black tightening straps at the back. In the LF, berets were worn pulled to the left in typical French fashion (although some LF male and female personnel preferred to wear their berets pulled to the right, contrary to custom), with the color sequence as follows: General Service, Armoured units and some Commando formations – black; Paratroopers, Adonis Defense Units and al-Maghaweer Commandos – maroon; Force Sadem Para-commandos – scarlet red; Marines – light blue. Intended to be worn only on formal occasions or for walking-out, LF berets were rarely seen in the field, being often replaced by ex-Lebanese Army Olive Green OG-106 Baseball caps, IDF "Old style" Olive Drab fatigue caps, locally-produced baseball caps made of Israeli Olive Drab cloth (possibly salvaged from discarded fatigues), and IDF "Kova raful" Olive Drab bush hats, with camouflage patrol caps and bucket hats in the "Waves/Swirl", "Duck Hunter" and "Tigerstripe" patterns being worn by LF Airborne and Commando troopers; U.S. Army BDU caps and Boonie hats in the U.S. Woodland camouflage pattern seized from the Lebanese Army were also used. In addition to fatigue or patrol caps, bush hats and berets, fur-lined cloth bomber hats, civilian knitted woollen caps and military commando caps of various colours were worn in the winter.

=== Footwear ===
Initially, the black leather combat boots worn by LF militiamen were the US Army M-1967 model with DMS "ripple" pattern rubber sole and the French Army "Rangers" BM65 (French: Rangers de l'Armée Française BM65) with double-buckle ankle cuff, both standard issue in the Lebanese Armed Forces, obtained either directly from LAF stocks or acquired as surplus. Such early combat footwear was partially superseded by IDF Hot Weather Tactical Boot models, the Combat Black light 825 Boots and the Paratrooper Brown light 8251 Boots, which were provided in considerable numbers by the Israelis. Several models of civilian sneakers or "trainers" and "chucks" were also worn by LF personnel on occasion.

=== Helmets and body armour ===
In the field, LF infantrymen could be found wearing a variety of helmet types, consisting of US M-1 and French M1951 NATO (French: Casque Mle 1951 OTAN) steel helmets taken from Lebanese Army stocks or provided by Israel, who also supplied Orlite Industries Ltd composite fibreglass OR-201 Model 76 ballistic helmets, which partially replaced the earlier steel types. Armoured crews, depending on the vehicle they manned, received the OR-601 and OR-603 tanker's helmets in ballistic Kevlar (Israeli copies of the US fibreglass "bone dome" Combat Vehicle Crewman (CVC) T-56-6 helmet and CVC DH-132 helmet, respectively) or Soviet TSh-4M black tanker's padded cloth helmets. LF combat troops were also issued with flak jackets, either the Ballistic Nylon US M-1952/69 'Half-collar' version or the Israeli-produced Kevlar Rabintex Industries Ltd Type III RAV 200 Protective Vest (Hebrew: "Shapats").

=== Accoutrements ===
Standard web gear consisted on the IDF 1950's "Old style" Tan-Khaki cotton canvas equipment (similar in design to the British Army's 58 pattern webbing) and the newer Olive Green (OG) Cordura-type Nylon Ephod Combat Vest, which were provided in substantial quantities by the Israelis since 1978. Photographic evidence shows that LF militiamen could be found wearing a variety of other web gear types, including the British 58 pattern webbing, the U.S. Army M-1956 load-carrying equipment (LCE) in khaki cotton canvas and the all-purpose lightweight individual carrying equipment (ALICE) in OG Nylon captured from the Lebanese Army, ChiCom Type 56 chest rigs in khaki or olive green cotton fabric for the Soviet SKS semi-automatic rifle, Soviet three-cell and four-cell AK-47 magazine pouches in khaki or OG canvas, plus several variants of locally made, multi-pocket chest rigs and assault vests in khaki and OG cloth, canvas or Nylon.

Anti-tank teams issued with the RPG-7 rocket launcher received the correspondent Soviet rocket bag models in khaki canvas, the Gunner Backpack 6SH12, the Assistant Gunner Backpack and the Munitions Bag 6SH11, with Polish and East German versions in rubberized canvas being employed as well. LF infantry and Commando troops were also issued with the IDF Infantry Combat Pack or the Cotton Canvas Assault Backpack and the smaller IDF 1950's "Old style" Tan-Khaki Cotton Canvas Infantry Backpack.

LF Military policemen on patrol or assigned ceremonial duties were issued the IDF Military Police white canvas pistol belt and whitened leather pistol holster. Locally-made, personalized black or brown leather holsters and gunbelts were sometimes worn by members of LF Commando units.

=== Insignia ===
An olive green, olive drab, dark green, black or yellow cloth embroidered nametape bearing "Lebanese Forces" inscribed in green, yellow, black or white Arabic script, with the LF logo – a miniature detailed green and brown Lebanese Cedar tree inserted on a red circle – set in the middle was frequently worn above the left shirt pocket of combat fatigues by all-ranks. The Lebanese Forces nametape was usually worn sew-on, although a removable version made of synthetic material secured by a Velcro fastener was introduced very late in the War and saw only limited use.

The LF did develop a standard beret cap badge, featuring a yellow enamelled metal disc edged red with a green and brown Lebanese Cedar tree in the centre, inserted on a circular wreath consisting of interlocking laurel leaves, and superimposed on a upward pointing sword (or bayonet); issued to all-ranks, the LF beret badge was worn placed above the right eye in the usual French manner.

== See also ==
- Battle of Zahleh
- East Beirut canton
- Ehden massacre
- January 1986 Lebanese Forces coup
- Kataeb Regulatory Forces
- List of extrajudicial killings and political violence in Lebanon
- List of weapons of the Lebanese Civil War
- Marada Movement
- Mountain War (Lebanon)
- People's Liberation Army (Lebanon)
- Sabra and Shatila massacre
- South Lebanon Army
- Tyous Team of Commandos
- Zahliote Group
- 1982 kidnapping of Iranian diplomats
- 9th Infantry Brigade (Lebanon)
