= Lebanese Cross of Resistance =

Variation of the Christian cross

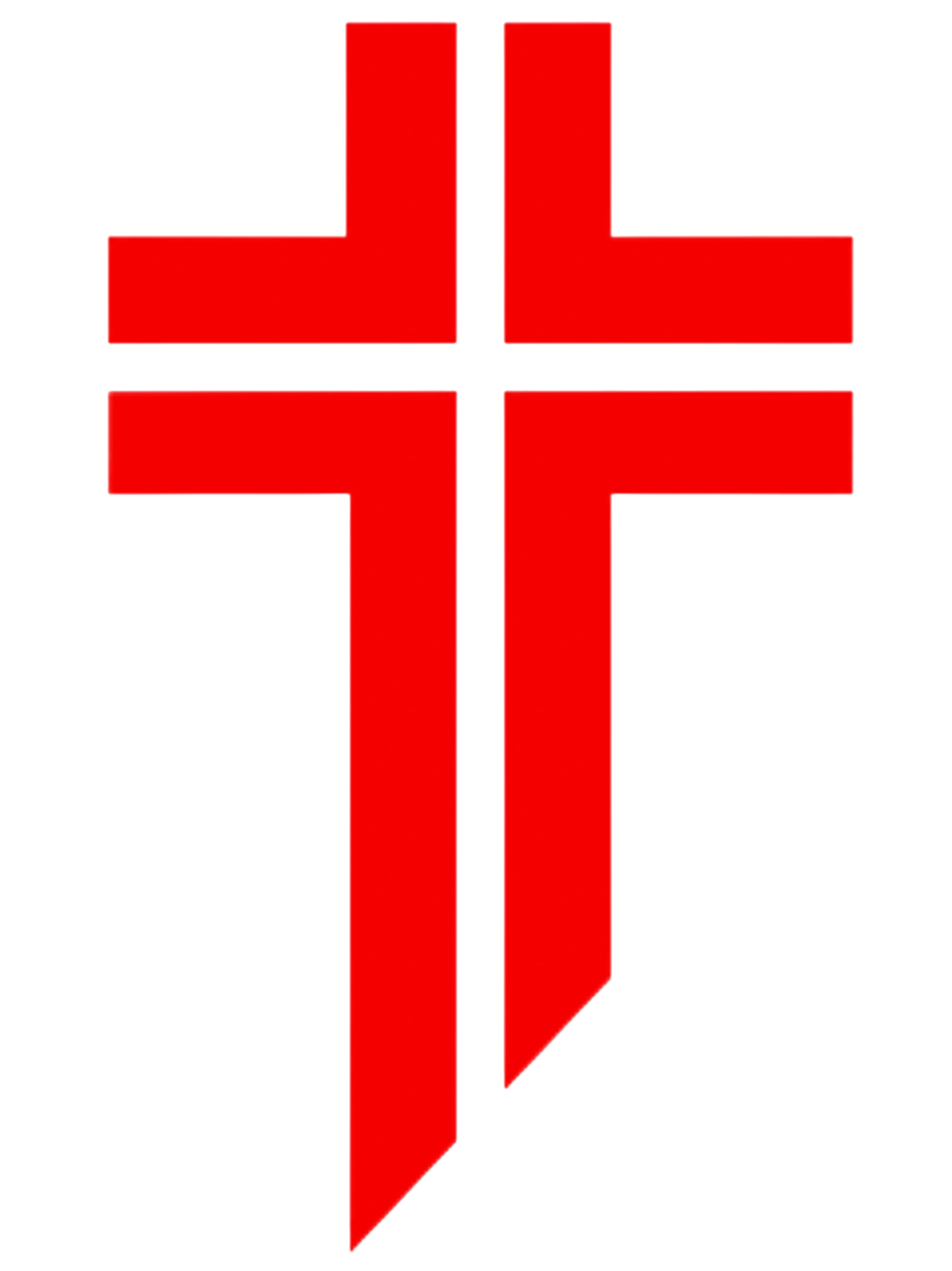
Lebanese Forces Cross of Resistance

The Cross of Resistance (Arabic: صليب المقاومة), more commonly known as the Fated Cross (Arabic: الصليب المشطوب), is a political and religious symbol belonging to the right-wing nationalist Lebanese Forces. It was founded during the Mountain War by Samir Geagea, it was created to boost morale when the Lebanese Forces were facing huge losses during the campaign.

== Background ==
The Lebanese Forces is an officially secular movement, founded by the charismatic Bachir Gemayel, basing most of its ideologies and actions off of Lebanese nationalism, and its main cause is to create a strong, unified, and inclusive Lebanon. However, the overwhelming majority of its support base consists of Maronite Christians, this is mostly because Lebanese nationalism appeals mostly to the Christians, while a lot of Muslims tend to lean towards Pan-Arabism or Pan-Islamism, which is why Lebanese nationalism is seen more as Christian-biased by many Lebanese Muslims.

== Creation ==
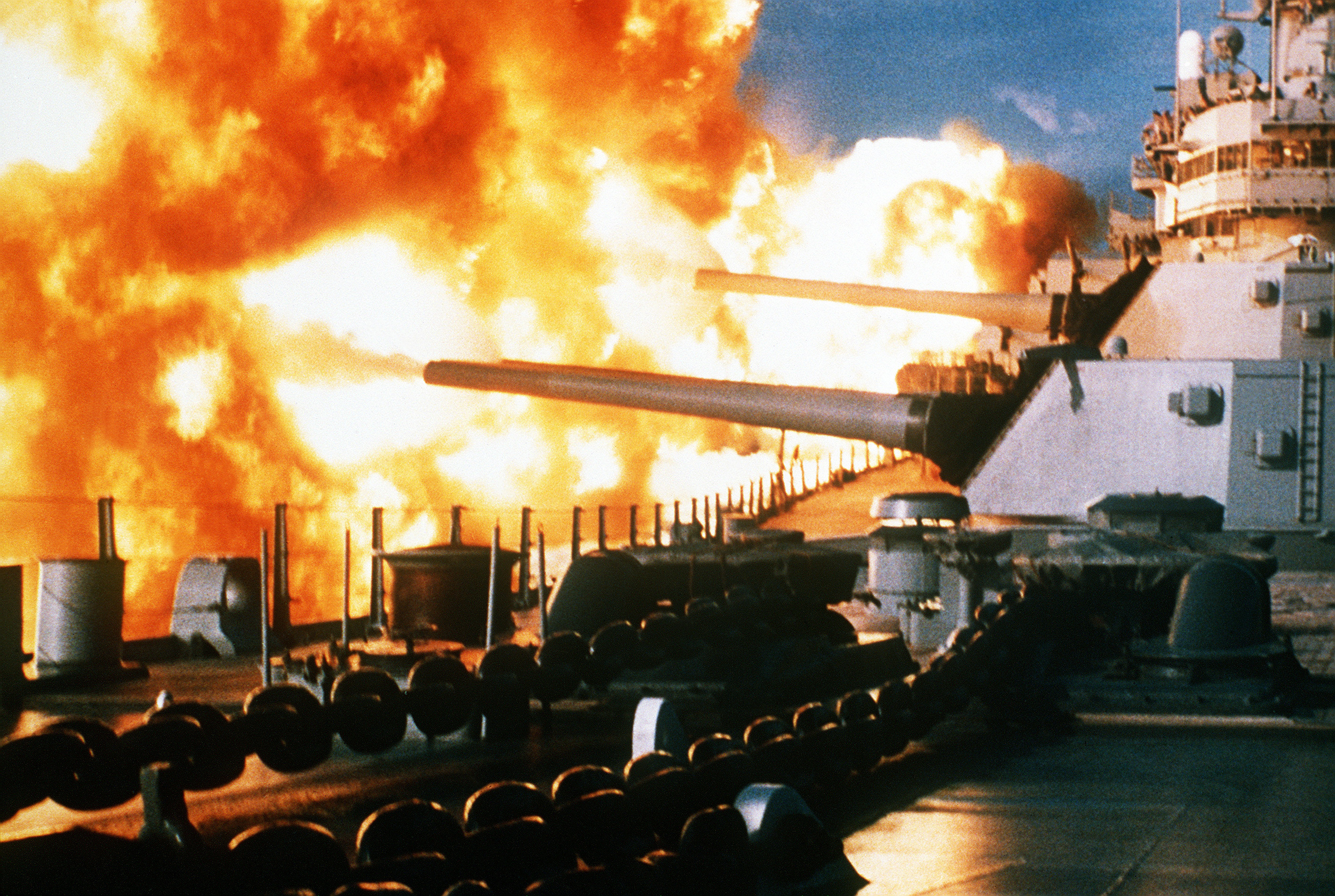
USS New Jersey firing a salvo at Progressive Socialist Party positions in Beirut during the Mountain War

During the Mountain War (1983–1984), Amine Gemayel, the president of Lebanon following the assassination of his brother Bachir, led the Lebanese army and the Kataeb to war against the Progressive Socialist Party representing the Druze and their leftist allies. The Lebanese Forces joined this campaign to fight alongside Amine, but very quickly the Phalange started losing. To boost morale among the predominantly Christian militia, the Lebanese Forces commanders Fadi Frem and Samir Geagea created a nationalistic and religious symbol to boost pride among the fighters, which we now know as the Cross of Resistance.

== Symbolism ==
Cross of Resistance Flag

The Lebanese Forces is a majority Christian movement; therefore, the symbol is inspired by a cross, though it is not a regular cross. The red in the symbol is a sign of Lebanese Christians' sacrifice and martyrdom and their unwavering commitment to staying in Lebanon. The diagonal cut at the base of the cross makes the Cross of Resistance what it is. It symbolizes the strength of the Lebanese Christians' will and their determination to keep the cross planted in this majority Muslim region of the world. The flag with the pointed, voided cross is not the official flag of the Lebanese Forces party. This cross has been launched by the Department of Faith in the Lebanese Forces on "Resistant Prayer Day" and was considered as the symbol or emblem of the "Lebanese Resistance" and not as the flag of the "Lebanese Forces".

== See also ==
- Lebanese Forces (militia)
- Lebanese Forces party
- Kataeb Party (Phalange)
- Samir Geagea
- Bachir Gemayel
- Amine Gemayel
- Fadi Frem
- Christianity in Lebanon
- Religion in Lebanon
- Lebanese Civil War
- Mountain War
