= War of Elimination (1990, Lebanon) =

Military conflict

- Part of the Lebanese Civil War
Date	31 January – 13 October 1990
Location	Beirut and surroundings, Lebanon
Result	Tactically inconclusive: Surrender of Aoun's forces to the Syrian Army; Syrian Army enters Christian-controlled areas of Lebanon; Lebanese Forces relinquish their arms and heavy artillery to Elias Hrawi's pro-Syrian Lebanese Government; Aoun exiled to France; Geagea eventually imprisoned in 1994

Belligerents
Lebanese Armed Forces (pro-Aoun faction)	Lebanese Forces

Commanders and leaders
Michel Aoun (surrendered); Issam Abou Jamra (surrendered); Edgar Maalouf (surrendered)	Samir Geagea; Boutros Khawand; Fouad Malek

The War of Elimination (Arabic: حرب الإلغاء or War of Attrition, also known as the Aoun-Geagea War) was an inter-Christian military conflict within the final phase of the Lebanese Civil War as part of the War of Liberation which took place between January and October 1990. It was fought between the Lebanese Army, led by General Michel Aoun, and the Lebanese Forces, led by Samir Geagea. The confrontation led to the total devastation of the Eastern Canton and ended with the Syrian army invading the Christian areas, Aoun's exile to France and subsequently the end of the civil war.

== Background ==
On 22 September 1988, Michel Aoun, the commander of the Army at the time, was appointed by president Amine Gemayel as the head of the Lebanese government.

On 14 March 1989, Aoun declared the War of Liberation against the Syrian occupation army in Lebanon.

On 31 January 1990, Aoun launched an offensive against the Lebanese Forces in East Beirut. In the months that followed, over 1000 people were killed.

A month later in March, Aoun declared a halt to the fighting and announced his willingness to accept the Taif Agreement with some amendments.

This confrontation ended with the Syrian army invading the Christian areas, the exile of Aoun to France, and Geagea's imprisonment after three years, due to a disagreement with the Syrians.

== Etymology ==
The conflict came to be known as the war of elimination (حرب الإلغاء), the term which was used by the LF to denote the attempt by Aoun to eliminate it. However, Aoun used the term Weapon Unification Battle (معركة توحيد البندقية) since he claimed his purpose was to submit all weapons in the country to the Lebanese Army. Nonetheless, the weapons are still possessed today by parties other than the government, like Hezbollah.

== Allegations ==
Some believe that the war was agreed between Aoun and the Syrians, in order to eliminate the Lebanese Forces and allow the Syrian army to enter the Christian Area, in return for Aoun's presidency. However, when the Syrians did not keep the promise, he declared the War of Liberation on the Syrians. However, 26 years later, in 2016 Aoun became the president of Lebanon.

== See also ==
- Lebanese Civil War
- Lebanese Armed Forces
- Lebanese Forces
- Weapons of the Lebanese Civil War

== Bibliography ==
- Barry Rubin (editor), Lebanon: Liberation, Conflict, and Crisis, Middle East in Focus, Palgrave Macmillan, London 2009. ISBN 978-1-349-37326-0 –
- Edgar O'Ballance, Civil War in Lebanon, 1975-92, Palgrave Macmillan, London 1998. ISBN 0-333-72975-7
- Hassan Krayem, The Lebanese Civil War and the Taif Agreement, American University of Beirut, in collaboration with Al Mashriq of Høgskolen i Østfold, Norway, 981125 PN (no date) –
- Paul E. Salem, Two Years of Living Dangerously: General Awn and Precarious Rise of Lebanon's Second Republic, The Beirut Review Vol. 1, No. 1 (spring 1991): 62-87.
- Robert Fisk, Pity the Nation: Lebanon at War, London: Oxford University Press, (3rd ed. 2001). ISBN 0-19-280130-9 –
- Oren Barak, The Lebanese Army – A National institution in a divided society, State University of New York Press, Albany 2009. ISBN 978-0-7914-9345-8 –
- Samir Makdisi and Richard Sadaka, The Lebanese Civil War, 1975-1990, American University of Beirut, Institute of Financial Economics, Lecture and Working Paper Series (2003 No.3), pp. 1–53. – Archived 2017-08-10 at the Wayback Machine
- Thomas Collelo (ed.), Lebanon: a country study, Library of Congress, Federal Research Division, Headquarters, Department of the Army (DA Pam 550-24), Washington D.C., December 1987 (Third edition 1989). –
- Tony Badran (Barry Rubin ed.), Lebanon: Liberation, Conflict, and Crisis, Palgrave Macmillan, London 2010. ISBN 978-0-230-62306-4
