= Battle of Bhamdoun (1983) =

Battle of the Lebanese Civil War

- Part of the Mountain War & Lebanese Civil War
Date	5–7 September 1983
Location	Bhamdoun, Aley District
Result	Progressive Socialist Party victory
Territorial changes	Bhamdoun is captured by the People's Liberation Army; Lebanese Forces withdraws to nearby villages

Belligerents
PSP; PLA; Supported by: LNRF	Kataeb Party; Lebanese Forces; Supported by: (Lebanon) Lebanese Army

Commanders and leaders
Walid Jumblatt; Anwar al-Fatayri; Ramzi al-Rayess; Saleh al-Deek; Ramez Assaf	Amine Gemayel; Fadi Frem; Fouad Abou Nader; Samir Geagea; Paul Andari

The Battle of Bhamdoun was fought over Bhamdoun between the Progressive Socialist Party (PSP) and the Lebanese Forces (LF) from 5 to 7 September 1983. It was the opening battle of the 1983 phase of the Lebanese Civil War and resulted in the successful capture of Bhamdoun by the Druze PLA militia.

== Background ==
Following the Israeli occupation of Lebanon's southern half in 1982, the Druze militias that controlled the Chouf were defeated and the PSP lost the territory that it controlled to the Israeli invasion. On 24 August, Bachir Gemayel, the leader of the Kataeb Party and its military wing, the Lebanese Forces, was elected President of Lebanon by the Lebanese Parliament, and despite his intentions to dissolve all the non-state militias and ensure the "liberation of Lebanon from all foreign armies" (including Israel) from Lebanon, PSP leader Walid Jumblatt viewed Gemayel's future presidency with suspicion describing the Lebanese internal structure as a "diktat" that was "destined to fall apart". When asked if he believed the civil war would restart, he said "there is a general "malaise" in West Beirut, we are afraid. So the prognosis is very poor. On the constitutional level he was elected legally, on the political level it is something else."

Following Bachir's assassination in September 1982, his brother Amine Gemayel took over the presidency and signed the May 17 Agreement with Israel, which led to Walid viewing his regime with increasing hostility. Throughout the summer of 1983, an embattled Walid Jumblatt began reorganising and rearming with Palestinian and Syrian assistance the People's Liberation Army (PLA), the armed wing of the PSP, as the prospect of war with the Lebanese government grew. In September 1983 the Israel Defense Forces withdrew from the Chouf and the Lebanese Army alongside the Lebanese Forces entered the region seeking to subdue the resurgent PSP/PLA, sparking the Mountain War.

== The battle ==
The Syrian government had advised the Lebanese Army to not enter the Chouf region, despite the Progressive Socialist Party's weakened state and the LF seizing the hillside villages around Bhamdoun from the Druze militias. Despite the erosion endured by the PSP, the strength of Walid Jumblatt's resurgent forces was greatly underestimated.

The Lebanese Army and the Lebanese Forces launched a joint assault on PSP positions in the Chouf, and the LF took Bhamdoun, which Druze militias shelled intensely. On 5 September, the Palestine Liberation Organization (PLO) relayed information to the LF that a large-scale Druze offensive was imminent, the LF commander Samir Geagea to evacuate all Christians from the region and fortified the city of Bhamdoun in anticipation of it.

Walid Jumblatt's offensive materialised the same day, launching a conventional assault that captured several towns and villages in the eastern Chouf and began closing in on Bhamdoun. The LF units, despite prior warning of the offensive, were not prepared for the unprecedented sheer size of the offensive and many of their positions were easily overrun by Druze PSP forces. The LF were instructed by the Lebanese Army to hold Bhamdoun for 12 hours before being relieved. However, the Lebanese Army, mired in its attempt to defeat the PSP's westwards offensive was unable to deliver. By the 7th of September, the PSP expelled the LF from Bhamdoun and took over the town, with Geagea's forces regrouping in Deir al-Qamar, which was also targeted by the Druze offensive.

384 fatalities have been documented during the takeover, which included summary executions of civilians and captured personnel. The event resulted in the complete destruction and looting of the town's Christian quarters.

== Aftermath ==
The battle of Bhamdoun was the beginning of a string of victories that would accelerate the PSP's territorial expansion and cement its position as the dominant militia in Lebanon until the rise of Hezbollah.

== See also ==
- Mountain War (Lebanon)
- February 6 Intifada
- Battle of the Hotels
- Chouf massacres (1977)
- List of massacres in Lebanon
- List of extrajudicial killings and political violence in Lebanon
