= Battle of Zahleh =

Battle during the Lebanese Civil War

Siege of Zahleh معركة زحلة
- Part of the Lebanese Civil War
Date	December 22, 1980 – June 30, 1981 (6 months and 8 days)
Location	Zahlé, Lebanon
Result	Lebanese Forces strategic victory

Belligerents
Lebanese Forces	Arab Deterrent Force: Syrian Armed Forces; Palestine Liberation Organization Hannache Group

Commanders and leaders
Bachir Gemayel	(Syria) Hafez al-Assad; Elias Hannache

Units involved
Lebanese Forces: Al Wahdat el-Markaziya (Special LF Central Units); ISF (Internal Security Forces); Zahlawi Local Resistance groups	Syrian Army Forces: 35th Brigade (Special Forces); 41st Brigade (Special Forces); 47th Brigade (Mechanized Infantry); 51st Brigade (Ind. Armored); 62nd Brigade (Mechanized Infantry); 67th Brigade; 85th Brigade; 78th Brigade; Palestine Liberation Organization: al-Yarmouk Faction; al-Kostol Faction

Casualties and losses
Est. 200 killed 200 wounded Total: 400 casualties	Est. 300 killed 400 wounded 32 tanks and Armored personnel carriers Total: 700 casualties
- 200 civilians killed and 2,000 wounded

The Battle of Zahleh (Arabic: معركة زحلة) was a battle in the Lebanese Civil War that took place between December 1980 and June 1981. During the seven-month period, the city of Zahle endured a handful of political and military setbacks. The opposing key players were on the one side, the Lebanese Forces (LF) aided by Zahlawi townspeople, and on the other side, the Syrian Armed Forces, then part of the peace-keeping Arab Deterrent Force (ADF) aided by some Palestine Liberation Organization (PLO) factions. Demographically, Zahleh is one of the largest predominantly Christian towns in Lebanon. Adjacent to the town's outskirts, the Bekaa valley, spanning the length of the Syrian borders. Given Zahleh's close proximity to the Bekaa Valley, the Syrian Armed Forces feared a potential alliance between Israel and the LF in Zahleh. This potential alliance would not only threaten the Syrian military presence in the Bekaa valley, but was regarded as a national security threat from the Syrians' point of view, given the close proximity between Zahleh and the Beirut-Damascus highway. Consequently, as a clamp-down strategy, the Syrian forces controlled the major roads leading in and out of the city and fortified the entire Valley. Around December 1980, tension increased between Zahlawi Lebanese Forces and Syrian-backed Leftist militants. From April to June 1981, throughout the four-month period, a handful of LF members, aided by Zahlawi Local Resistance, confronted the Syrian war machine and defended the city from Syrian intrusion and potential invasion.

== Background ==
The Lebanese Civil War began in April 1975, pitting the Christian-rightist militias of the Lebanese Front against the Muslim-leftist militias of the Lebanese National Movement (LNM) and their Palestine Liberation Organization (PLO) guerrilla factions' allies. This early phase lasted two years until the Syrian Army invaded Lebanon under the pretext of "stopping the war and protecting the Christians". However, it was later revealed that the Syrian Army had entered Lebanese territory at the beginning of the war under the cover of the Palestine Liberation Army (PLA) in order to put the resisting Christians in a vulnerable position in the war so that they would demand a Syrian intervention for their protection. The Christians, who were represented in the war mainly by the Phalangists, demanded in 1978 the withdrawal of all Syrian military forces from the country because they had turned into occupiers and their intentions became clear. In addition, Syria switched sides and stood with the PLO after the Camp David Accords in order the lead the Arabs in the conflict against Israel. As a result, tensions began to mount between the Christian militias and the Syrian Army, which led to the Hundred Days War that resulted in the expulsion of the Syrian Army from East Beirut and most of Mount Lebanon. These areas were called the "Free Areas".

== Prelude ==
Since the beginning of the Civil War, the city of Zahleh's key strategic location served as a key artery for the armed factions involved in the conflict, particularly for the Syrian Armed Forces who occupied the adjacent Bekaa Valley from May 1976. Throughout history, the city of Zahleh served as a trade hub for commerce; located between Damascus on the East side, including the fertile Bekaa valley that borders Syria, and Beirut City on the opposite west side. Although the inhabitants of Zahleh readily took advantage of their location for trade and commerce, their geo-strategic location was a deterrent on the socio-political level between 1980 and 1981. From the west side, the city lies at the base of the 8,622 feet high Mount Sannine. The peak of Mount Sannine, not only overlooked the entire Bekaa Valley, but the Israeli-occupied Golan heights and even further. With that said, the Syrian's securing at least the base of Mount Sannine prevented any potential Israeli or LF attempts to scrutinize the occupied Golan Heights and further deep into Syrian territories.

== The Syrian reaction ==
Strategically, the prime concern of the Syrians was to curb the Christian-controlled city's geo-strategic attributes. Consequently, the Syrian Army blocked the main roads leading in and out of the city. The Syrian forces, however, remained stationed outside the city, in particular, along the outskirts. The Syrian Army's Chief-of-staff at the time, General Hikmat Chehabi expressed concerns over a free and uncontrolled Zahleh falling into the hands of the Israel Defense Forces (IDF). The Israelis were providing military aid to the LF, whose presence was apparent inside Zahleh. Chehabi's concern was, that the LF might hand over the base of mount Sannine to the Israelis, given the mount peek outlooks the Golan heights and deep inside Syrian territories. To that end, Chehabi foresaw a problematic scenario on more than one level. One, if the Israeli Defense Forces cut through Zahleh city and position their troops along its outskirts, they would be stationed only four miles West of the Syrian fifth division stationed in the town of Chtaura, located by the Beirut-Damascus highway. Two, such a scenario, if actualized, would not only threaten Syrian military presence in the Valley, but even the Syrian capital itself – the Israelis would be 8.6 miles West of the Syrian border and 31 miles from the Syrian capital, Damascus. For that reason, the Syrian 85th and 78th brigades along with the 7th division regrouped across the valley. In addition, Chehabi provided logistical support to the Palestine Liberation Organization (PLO) al-Yarmouk, al-Kostol and Ain Jallout conventional mechanized brigades positioned between the Litani and Zahrani rivers.

== Initial Syrian setbacks ==
Prior to the December setbacks, the Syrian Intelligence Service assassinated several members of the predominantly Christian Kataeb and Ahrar parties in order to turn one against the other, but the local leaders of these parties were aware of the Syrian plans. Congregating surreptitiously in and around Zahle, the Moukhabarat then facilitated the entry into the town of a small dissident Christian militia commanded by Elias El-Hannouche (nicknamed "Hannache"), the Free Tigers (also known as the "Hannache Group"). Tensions between the local right-wing LF militiamen and the newcomers soon began to mount. The catalyst to the initial setbacks ensued when Hannache and its Free Tigers attempted to seize control of the offices of the National Liberal Party (NLP) in Zahle. On December 22, 1980, clashes broke out between local LF members and the Hannache's Free Tigers, which resulted ultimately in the expulsion of the latter from Zahle. After previous failed attempts, the Syrians tried to enter the city, but the LF responded swiftly and during the confrontation a total of five Syrian soldiers were killed. As a result, the Syrian Forces shelled the overpopulated city for six consecutive hours, to pressure the Zahlawis to hand over the militiamen responsible for the killings. To further increase the psychological pressure on the town's inhabitants and its LF garrison, the Syrian checkpoints dispersed around the outskirts of the city blocked the flow of foodstuffs and other supplies going in and out from Zahle, and Syrian MIGs flew over the city for a long period of time. On the international level, the disproportionate Syrian reaction triggered widespread international criticism. France for example, described the shelling as a barbaric act; Washington described the shelling as a deplorable Syrian act. Consequently, the shelling stopped due to the international pressure; the turmoil cooled off between January and March due to heavy snow storms the city endured during the winter of 1980–81. The two sides, however, remained alert while preparing for the upcoming conclusive battle.

== Preparation for the battle ==
The dire socio-political situation of Zahle alarmed the LF High Command in Beirut. A weighty LF presence, however, was scarce in and around the turmoiled city. In addition to the impeding Syrian siege, the initial setbacks coincided with a harsh snowy winter. The siege and the rugged snowy mountains encumbered the LF and hindered the ability of trained elite LF fighters to come from Beirut to aid local Zahlawis and local LF. Nonetheless, the LF Commander-in-chief Bashir Gemayel, dispatched his Chief-of-staff Dr. Fouad Abou Nader to assess the dire situation in Zahleh. Reaching the city was problematic for Abou Nader on two levels: in addition to the cold winter and the heavy snow descending on the highest city of Lebanon, the Syrians controlled most of the main roads leading in and out of the city. To reach the city safely without being compromised by the Syrians, Abou Nader had to take foot trails and walk down the mountain in the snow, cutting down through the el-Berdawni river. Upon reaching the town, Abou Nader noticed that, although the Syrians blocked the northern access leading in and out the city, the southern access, in particular the Chtaura road, was nevertheless open to circulation. To that end, arms were smuggled into the city, hidden in trucks carrying loads of wheat. A task-force of 120 trained Commandos from the LF Central Units under the dual command of Joe Edde and Kayrouz Baraket (a senior militia commander of the Guardians of the Cedars) was dispatched from Beirut to Zahleh to reinforce and organize the local 1,500 Christian militiamen and the citizens of Zahle, and preparing them for the upcoming battle. They used bulldozers in order to move the snow from the roads and set up a direct telephone line from Zahle to the LF military headquarters in Karantina. The Lebanese Forces began preparations for the siege by setting up a temporary field hospital and formed social assistance groups to oversee the needs of the local population. Plus, landmines were laid down, trenches were dig, and barricades were set up.

On the other hand, the Syrians surrounded Zahle from all sides and they consolidated their positions on previously-controlled hills. This made any movement by the Lebanese Forces in the city open to be seen by the Syrian Forces. The Syrians started kidnapping several Zahliots and tortured them. Tensions between the Zahliots and the Syrians intensified during the last two weeks of March 1981.

== The battle ==
=== First phase ===
On April 1, 1981, the Syrians moved in to control two hills, Harkat and Hammar, which links Zahle to the mountains. They were seen by the Lebanese Forces and they fired back. This was the trigger that started the battle of Zahle. The Lebanese Forces assumed their positions according to the plan that was put to defend Zahle.

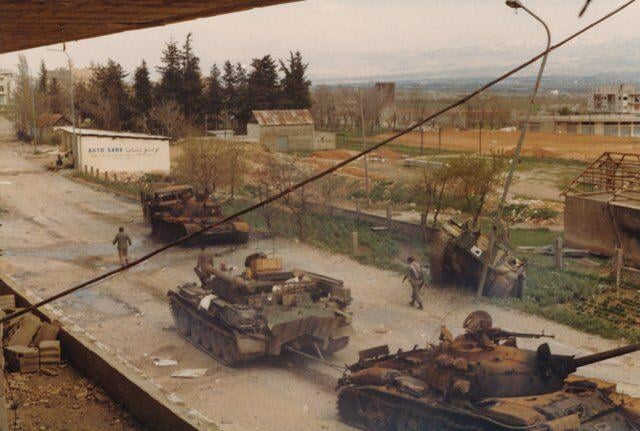
Destroyed Syrian tanks, 1981

The bridge in Zahle witnessed a ruthless battle on April 2–3 where the massive Syrian attack lasted from night till dawn and they weren't able to control it. During the battle for the bridge, the Syrian artillery pounded the city continuously which led to the death of tens of Zahliots while the Syrian Army lost about 50 men. Plus, the bridge was the place of the "massacre of tanks" since the Lebanese Forces were able to destroy more than 20 Syrian tanks in 2 days. The tenacity and courageousness and effectiveness of the fighters of the Lebanese Forces made the Syrians assume that Israeli soldiers were fighting alongside them.

During the engagement, the Zahliots moved from the combat areas to a huge building because it was able to sustain a lot of damage. The Syrians focused their bombardment on this building until it collapsed on those hiding inside it which led to the death of 30 Zahliots, mainly women and children, while the Lebanese Forces were able to rescue 7 Zahliots who were still alive under the rubble. One of the rescued children was an 8-year-old boy who was yelling "Phalange, help, save me!" The dangerously wounded were taken to France for treatment.

On April 4, a civilian automobile driven by a Christian nun named Marie-Sofie Zoghby accompanied by 2 nurses, Khalil Saydah and Salim Hamoud, that brought bread and medicine to the local hospitals was car was severely hit by Syrian fire which caused it to slam into a wall. The Syrians continued shooting at the car even after it crashed. The Lebanese Forces engaged in combat with the Syrians in order to be able to pull the bodies out of the car. The 2 nurses with her were Muslims and that showed that the Christians were not alone.

The then Lebanese minister of public works Elias Hrawi sent a message from the Zahliots to the Syrian President, Hafez al-Assad, telling him that the only way to put an end to the fighting was to send the Lebanese Army to Zahle and that they will continue to resist the Syrian siege until this solution was implemented. President Assad simply replied that his army would not be defeated by a militia.

After the intense fighting in the first two days, Bashir Gemayel decided to send more troops from Beirut to help with in the defense. In addition, MILAN anti-tank missiles were also sent to stop the advance of the Syrian tanks.

=== Second phase ===
After the failing to enter Zahle through military might, the Syrian Army centered its operations towards the surrounding hills to tighten its siege over the town.

The Lebanese Forces knew that they could not defeat the Syrians in the battle for the hills due to their large numbers and their air superiority. They decided to try and fight for a few strategic hills so that they could keep the mountainous roads available for use for the movement of ammo and food.

The Syrians were able to control all of the hills in about a week. Although the Lebanese Forces were able to cause many casualties in the Syrian Army, the armed helicopters used by the Syrians gave them a huge advantage. By controlling the hills, the Syrians closed all the roads that lead to Zahle.

On the night of April 10–11, Bashir called the fighters in Zahle and told them "Because the road is still open for a few hours only ... if you leave, you will save your lives and the fall of the city will be certain and this will be the end of our resistance ... if you stay, you will find yourselves without ammunition, without medicine, without bread, and maybe without water; your task will be to coordinate the internal resistance and defend the identity of the Lebanese Bekaa and the identity of Lebanon, and by that you will give a meaning to our six year war. If you decide to stay, know one thing, that heroes die and they don't surrender." Joe Edde, the man in charge in Zahle, looked at the faces of the fighters and he directly knew the answer, he replied to Bashir "We will stay".

The siege of Zahle became sealed, and it was impossible to even send a piece of bread to the city. Bachir sent to the Israelis a series of exaggerated messages about the condition of Zahle in order to receive any kind of help from them. The Israelis said that they are ready to assist the Lebanese Forces diplomatically and by sending them weapons.

The Syrians then moved to control the highly strategic Mount Sannine and the French Room (the highest point on the mountain). The Syrians air raids played an important part in the successful capture of the mountain. This was a very dangerous move by the Syrians since it put the entire "Free Christian Areas" in a dangerous position.

Bachir was afraid that this was the beginning of a full-scale attack on all the Christian areas. He met with the head of the Syrian Air Force intelligence agency, Mohammad El Khaouly where he told him that they will only be able to enter Zahle by force. On the other hand, the Israelis intervened on the side of the Lebanese Forces, by shooting down Syrian choppers over Mount Sannine. The Syrians replied by putting SAM missiles in the Bekaa Valley. East Beirut was living in fear because of a possible Syrian attack, but the successful resistance in Zahle made the Syrians rethink their plans. Plus, the Lebanese Forces started preparing the front lines in case of a Syrian attack.

These events made the USA intervene quickly to calm things down between Syria and Israel because it was afraid that a Syrian-Israeli war might lead to a war between them and the Soviet Union. The intervention was successful.

=== Third phase ===
After the American intervention to calm things down between Israel and Syria was successful, the fierce battle continued between the Syrians and the Lebanese Forces.

As the battle continued in Zahle, the Syrians were trying to enter into Kaa' El Rim, a town next to Zahle; however, the Locales in Kaa' El Rim launched a counter-attack and they were able to prevent the Syrians from entering the town. The fall of this town would put Zahle in a vulnerable position and facilitate its capture by the Syrians, so the Locales in Kaa' El Rim prepared the front lines in order to repel any future attack by the Syrian Army.

After a month after the failure of the capture of Kaa' El Rim, the Syrians blew up the water tanks and this led to the cutting of the supply of water from the city for two days; however, one of the employees told the Lebanese Forces that there is a backup water tank from the old network. Water was restored to the town, and it was also routed to Zahle. The perimeter surrounding the water tank was planted with mines to prevent the Syrians from reaching the generator and the tank in case the Syrians came close to that area.

After a month and a half since the start of the fighting in Kaa' El Rim, some fighters asked Hanna El Atik, the person in charge, the possibility of surrendering the town since it was completely destroyed and defending it has become really difficult. This generated an argument between them until Hanna yelled "You still have your dignity. You either keep it or surrender it." The fighters returned to their posts and they remained in the town till the end of the war.

The importance of Kaa' El Rim is that it contained chocolate factories and farms which provided food for its inhabitants and for the Zahliots. After the failure of invading Zahle, the Syrians offered a solution that contained the following conditions:

- The Lebanese Army replaces the Lebanese Forces in Zahle on condition that the soldiers are from Eblej (known for their loyalty to Syria), they obey Syrian orders, they are chosen by the Syrians, and the Syrians can replace any soldier they want.
- The Syrian Army keeps its control over the surrounding hills.
- The Syrians control the border of Zahle with the Bekaa Valley.
- The Syrians control the international road Beirut-Damascus.
- The Lebanese Forces leave Zahle without storing any weapons there.

Plus, the Lebanese Forces had to release a statement saying that the Syrians are not an occupying army and to stop calling for a Syrian withdrawal, and to acknowledge that the Bekaa Valley line cannot be passed since it belongs to Syria.

Bachir strongly rejected these conditions since the Syrians were trying to achieve in peace what they couldn't achieve in war. The Lebanese Forces put a new defensive plan and they prepared for another wave of fighting.

=== Fourth and final phase ===
The fighting resumed and the lower floors of the schools became shelters for the women and children. Food was passed on for free to the houses where the women would prepare the food for the fighters.

The Syrians launched an attack on the "Hill of Jeha" in order to penetrate through the front lines. The Lebanese Forces quickly tried to form a secondary defense line after they were told that the Syrians were able to capture the hill. They realized that forming a secondary defense line is difficult due to the type of the land on the hill, so they launched an attack to retake the hill. They were supported by the "Baskinta" artillery that hit the hill with about 300 shells. The plan worked and many Syrian soldiers were found dead because of the bombing.

The Syrians realized their losses and their failure in capturing the hill, so they replied by shelling Zahle for 16 continuous hours.

== End of the battle ==
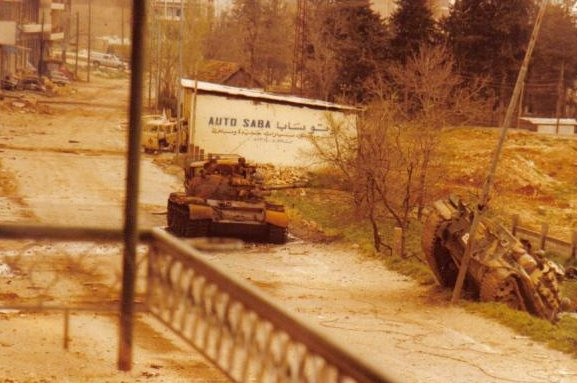
Two destroyed and abandoned T-55 tanks

After a series of Arab interventions and tries, a solution was finally reached in late June 1981. It was decided that the Syrians would abandon their positions around Zahle, and the Lebanese Forces would be replaced by Lebanese Internal Security Forces. This solution was considered a victory for the Lebanese Forces since they were able to resist the Syrian attack and keep the city free from foreign occupation. After 3 months of destruction, death, blood, and tears, Zahle breathed a sigh of relief. The Zahliots welcomed the Lebanese ISF with rice and roses, and they cried during the departure of the Lebanese Forces. One of the Zahliots said "We don't want to leave the fighters who defended our town with their blood, but we also cannot reject the peace and the arrival of the government forces."

Bachir was afraid that the Syrians would attack Zahle after the Lebanese Forces left, so they kept a small team just in case.

The Lebanese Forces were supposed to surrender the heavy weapons to the Syrians, but they rejected that. Instead, the Syrians produced some equipment that doesn't work so that the press had something to photograph. Of course, nobody believed that these were the only weapons that were used in resisting a 3 months full-scale attack, but they couldn't do anything about it.

During the return to Beirut, the people in all areas threw rice over the fighters in the buses until they reached the huge ceremony that was done on their behalf in Karantina. Bachir decorated them with medals for their tremendous resistance and in his speech he told them "You can now rest because Zahle remained Lebanese and free".

== After the Withdrawal ==
Bachir sent a team to assess the damages and start with the reconstructions since the city and the neighboring towns were completely destroyed.

The Syrians tried to enter the city several times, but the Lebanese ISF stood in their way and that stopped the attacks.

After a month, the team that stayed in Zahle returned to Beirut after things cooled down.

== Protests held during the Zahle campaign ==
-Public demonstrations were held in Paris, New York, and Ottawa that demanded the withdrawal of the Syrians and the halting of the "massacre" in Zahle.

-The bishops in Zahle played an important role in the war where they stressed on the independence of Zahle and Lebanon, and they held a demonstration near the Presidential Palace in Baabda.

-Hunger strike by the nuns demonstrating near the Presidential Palace.

-Pope John Paul II called for the stop of the Syrian onslaught on Zahle.

-Many governments called for the end of hostilities, including Egypt, Kuwait, Saudi Arabia, and the United States, in addition to the United Nations.

== Formation of the Force Sadem ==
Hanna El Atik took advantage of the extra month he stayed in Zahle to write a report to Bashir where he studied the pros and cons of the defense strategy used and how it could be improved. He also suggested the formation of a special fighting unit called "Sadem" that would consist of hand-picked volunteers from the Lebanese Forces. Bashir agreed to the suggestion and they promptly began planning the structure and the goals of this unit.

== See also ==
- List of extrajudicial killings and political violence in Lebanon
- Bachir Gemayel
- Kataeb Regulatory Forces
- Lebanese Civil War
- Lebanese Front
- Lebanese Forces
- List of weapons of the Lebanese Civil War
- Syrian Arab Armed Forces
- Waltz with Bashir
- Zahliote Group
