= Johnny Abdo =

Lebanese diplomat (born 1940)

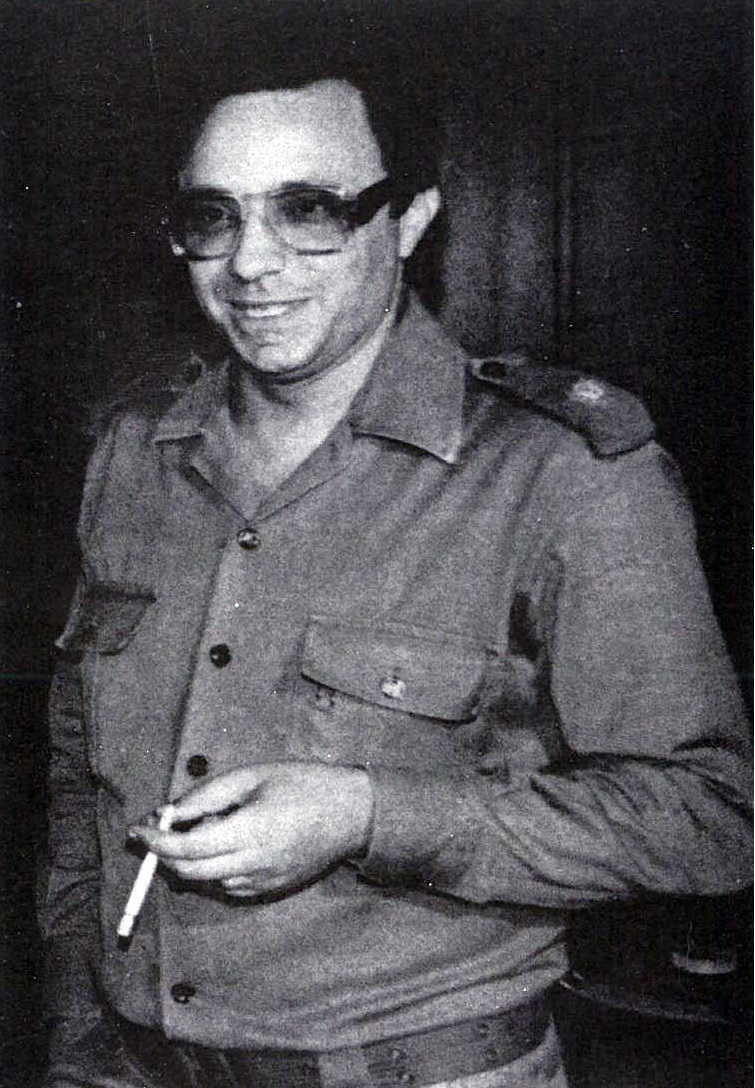
Johnny Abdo

Johnny Abdo (Arabic: جوني عبده, born 1940) is a Lebanese former head of military intelligence and ambassador. He is a controversial figure, because of his involvement and deep knowledge of the Lebanese Civil War. He is currently and willingly residing in Paris.

== Biography ==
He was the chief of Lebanese intelligence in the late 1970s and early 1980s, which was known as the Second Bureau (المكتب الثاني) during president Elias Sarkis's rule.

In the 1970s, his name rose to prominence due to the important role he played during the Lebanese Civil War, during which he helped arranging the election of president Bashir Gemayel, the leader of the Lebanese Forces, with whom he had a dispute in the past.

After Bashir's assassination, his brother Amin Gemayel assumed the presidency and he appointed him ambassador to Lebanon in the country Switzerland in 1983, then France in the early 90s until 1995, where he currently lives (in Paris).
