= Habib Shartouni =

Lebanese assassin

Habib Tanious Shartouni حبيب الشرتوني
- Habib Chartouni at trial
- Born: 24 April 1958 (age 68); Chartoun, Aley, Lebanon
- Political party: Syrian Social Nationalist Party
- Criminal charge: Assassination of President-elect Bachir Gemayel

Habib Tanious Shartouni (Arabic: حبيب الشرتوني; born 24 April 1958) is a Lebanese militant and convicted assassin of Bachir Gemayel, the Lebanese president and leader of the Lebanese Forces, on 14 September 1982. A member of the Syrian Social Nationalist Party (SSNP), Shartouni placed a bomb in the Kataeb Party headquarters in Beirut, where Gemayel was meeting with party members. His motive was in his opposition to Gemayel's policies, which were seen at the time as aligned with Israel, which was viewed as against Arab interests.

Shartouni spent eight years in Roumieh Prison without a trial. He escaped to Syria during the Syrian offensive in 1990, where he lived for several years. In 2017, he was sentenced to death in absentia by Lebanon's Judicial Council.

His whereabouts today remain a mystery, but rumors persist that he has found refuge in Syria, while others suggest he is hiding in Lebanon under Hezbollah's protection, or that he lives between both countries.

== Early life ==
Habib Tanious Shartouni, a Maronite Christian, was born on April 24, 1958, in a small village of Chartoun in Aley, Mount Lebanon. In the early 1970s, a few years before the outbreak of the Lebanese Civil War, he was inspired and became affiliated with the Syrian Social Nationalist Party (SSNP). When the civil war broke out, Shartouni volunteered to serve in one of the SSNP stations in Aley.

A few months later, he was advised by his parents to flee from Lebanon to Cyprus and then to France where he attended a university in Paris and obtained a degree in business. He had spent his first year in Paris away from politics until the late summer of 1977, during which he officially joined the SSNP upon his return to Lebanon and became an active member ever since.

Upon his return to France, he carried all the necessary contacts pertaining to the party's delegates in Paris and started attending some of their secret meetings, wherein he met Nabil Alam, the chief of interior of the party at the time. Alam made a significant impression on Shartouni, which paved the way for Bachir's assassination.

== Assassination of Bachir Gemayel ==
After completing his studies in Paris, Shartouni returned to Lebanon and became very close to Nabil Alam, who planned the assassination of Bachir Gemayel, knowing that Shartouni used to live on the third floor of the building where the Kataeb Party headquarters was located.

Subsequently, he was advised by Alam to carry the explosives from his place in West Beirut to the other end in Achrafieh, in the eastern side of the city, above the Kataeb headquarters. After he had carried all the necessary explosives, he received the detonator from Alam and managed to carry it safely to his aunt's place in Achrafieh, a few miles away from his place.

Shartouni had made up his mind to carry out the operation. On the night of 13 September 1982, he sneaked onto the second floor of the building where the Kataeb Party office was located in Achrafieh. His behaviour did not arouse suspicion since he lived on the third floor of the same building with his sister and grandparents. He went to the room above the platform on which Bachir and his companions would be seated and stashed about 40 to 50 kg of high explosives.

The next afternoon Shartouni remained, where Bachir was supposed to deliver a speech to greet his old companions, until he made sure Bachir had arrived. He walked out of the building and ran to the sector of Nasra, where he had kept the detonator. Ten minutes after Bachir had started his speech, Habib pressed the detonator. The sound of the explosion was heard all over Beirut. Immediately after the blast he walked back to the premises to check the result.

== Arrest and imprisonment ==
Two days later Shartouni was arrested by the Lebanese Forces. Shartouni was handed over to Lebanese justice. Amine Gemayel, Bachir's elder brother, succeeded him to the presidency seat after his assassination. Habib had spent eight years held captive in Roumieh prison without an official trial, until 13 October 1990 when he escaped during the final Syrian offensive in Lebanon that was aimed at toppling the government headed by Michel Aoun. Shartouni was sentenced to death in absentia by the Lebanese court on 20 October 2017 after admitting his part in the assassination. In interviews with Lebanese newspaper al-Akhbar in 2012 and 2017, Shartouni stated that after his escape, he resided in Syria between 1994 and 2004, and did not disclose his current whereabouts. He also denied that he visited Lebanon since his escape from prison in 1990.

== Trial ==
On 20 October 2017, the Judicial Council, Lebanon's highest state security court, sentenced Habib Shartouni and Nabil al-Alam to death in absentia in the case of the 1982 assassination of President-elect Bachir Gemayel. The Council also stripped former Syrian Social Nationalist Party members Shartouni and Alam of their civil rights.

== See also ==
- Assassination of Bachir Gemayel
- List of extrajudicial killings and political violence in Lebanon
- 1982 Lebanon War
- Lebanese Civil War
- Syrian nationalism
