= Assassination of Bachir Gemayel =

1982 bombing of the Kataeb Party headquarters

- Part of The 1982 Lebanon War, The Lebanese Civil War and The Arab-Israeli conflict
- The Kataeb headquarters after the explosion
- Location: Kataeb Party headquarters, Beirut, Lebanon
- Date: 14 September 1982; 44 years ago 14:10 PM
- Target: Bachir Gemayel
- Attack type: TNT explosion
- Weapon: Remote-controlled explosive
- Deaths: 24, including Gemayel
- Injuries: 70+
- Perpetrators: SSNP-L members Habib Shartouni and Nabil Alam. Allegedly commanded by Hafez Al-Assad
- Motive: Gemayel's temporary co-operation with the IDF during the 1982 Lebanon war
- Convictions: Mass murder; Assassination; Premeditated murder
- Convicted: Habib Shartouni, sentenced to death in 2011.

On 14 September 1982, a bomb was detonated during a meeting of the right-wing Kataeb Party (also known as the Phalanges) in the Beirut neighbourhood of Achrafieh. Militia commander and Lebanese president-elect Bashir Gemayel and 23 other Kataeb Party politicians were killed in the attack.

The attack was carried out by Habib Shartouni and allegedly planned by Nabil Alam, both members of the Syrian Social Nationalist Party (SSNP). Both men were believed to have acted on instructions of the Syrian government led by president Hafez al-Assad. The next day, the Israel Defense Forces (IDF) moved to occupy the city, allowing members of the Lebanese Forces militia under the command of Elie Hobeika to enter the centrally located Sabra neighborhood and adjoining Shatila refugee camp. Militia members then massacred between 1,300 and 3,500 civilians, mostly Palestinians and Lebanese Shia Muslims, causing an international uproar.

== Background ==
Israel invaded Lebanon in 1982. Defense Minister of Israel, Ariel Sharon, met with Gemayel months earlier, telling him that the Israeli Defense Force (IDF) were planning an invasion to uproot the PLO threat to Israel and to move them out of Lebanon. While Gemayel did not control Israel's actions in Lebanon, the support Israel gave the Lebanese Forces, militarily and politically, angered many Lebanese leftists. Gemayel had planned to use the IDF to push the Syrian Army out of Lebanon and then use his relations with the Americans to pressure the Israelis into withdrawing from Lebanese territory. On 23 August 1982, being the only one to declare candidacy, Gemayel was elected president in an election boycotted by Muslim MPs, as he prevailed over the National Movement. Israel had relied on Gemayel and his forces as a counterbalance to the PLO, and as a result, ties between Israel and Maronite groups, from which hailed many of the supporters of the Lebanese Forces, had grown stronger.

=== Perpetrators ===
Habib Tanious Shartouni, a Maronite Christian, was born in a small village called Chartoun (Arabic: شرتون) in Aley, Mount Lebanon. In the early 1970s, only a few years before the outbreak of the Lebanese Civil War, he was inspired and became affiliated with the Syrian Social Nationalist Party (SSNP). When war broke out, he volunteered to serve in one of the SSNP stations in Aley. Shartouni fled to France where he attended a university in Paris and obtained a degree in business until the late summer of 1977 during which he officially joined the SSNP upon his first visit to Lebanon and became an active member ever since. Upon his return to France, he carried all the necessary contacts pertaining to the party's delegates in Paris and started attending some of their secret meetings, wherein he met Nabil Alam, the chief of interior of the party at the time. Alam made a significant impression on Shartouni, which paved the way for Bachir's assassination.

== Assassination ==
On 14 September 1982, Bashir Gemayel was addressing fellow Kataeb Party members (Phalangists) at their headquarters in Achrafieh for the last time as their leader and for the last time as commander of the Lebanese Forces. At 4:10 PM, an estimated 180 kilograms of TNT was detonated, killing Gemayel and 23 other Phalange politicians. The first testimonies stated that Gemayel had left the premises on foot or in an ambulance.

For several hours after the explosion, rumors persisted that Gemayel had survived the blast. Some reported that he was receiving ongoing treatment for leg bruises at the nearby Hotel Dieu hospital. In reaction to this, church bells were rung in celebration of his reported survival. The commander of military intelligence Jonny Abdu reported that Gemayel had been taken to a hospital in Haifa by helicopter. The search and rescue teams on the field were unable to find him or his body.

Gemayel's body was finally identified five and a half hours after the explosion by a Mossad agent in a church near the site, where the dead were being collected. It was concluded that he had been one of the first people moved to the church after the explosion. However, Bachir's wife, Solange, says the body was actually identified six hours later at the Hôtel-Dieu de France hospital, thanks to a letter from his sister, Arze, the white-gold wedding ring he was wearing, and two letters on the ring addressed to himself. Then–prime minister Shafik Wazzan confirmed the following morning that Gemayel had indeed been killed in the attack, saying, "I face this shocking news with the strongest denunciation for this criminal act."

== Aftermath ==
=== Israeli occupation of Beirut ===
Following the news of Gemayel's assassination, Israeli Prime Minister Menachem Begin, Defense Minister Ariel Sharon, and Chief of Staff Rafael Eitan agreed that the Israeli army should invade West Beirut. The public reason given was to be that they were there to prevent chaos. In a separate conversation, Sharon and Eitan agreed that the Israel Defense Forces (IDF) should not enter the Palestinian refugee camps in Beirut, but that the Phalange should be used instead.

Shortly after 6.00 a.m. on 15 September, the Israeli army entered West Beirut in violation of a 1981 ceasefire brokered by the United States. Between 1,300 and 3,500 civilians, mostly Palestinians and Lebanese Shia Muslims, were massacred by members of the Lebanese Forces militia in an alleged act of retaliation for the assassination, which was overseen by the IDF.

=== International response ===
The United Nations Security Council issued Resolution 520 demanding that Israel withdraw immediately from Lebanon. American President Ronald Reagan, who had been one of Gemayel's staunchest supporters, issued a statement of condolences for his death, saying "this promising young leader had brought the light of hope to Lebanon."

=== Election of Amine Gemayel ===
Bachir Gemayel's older brother Amine Gemayel was not long after elected president, serving from 1982 to 1988. The elder Gemayel was elected during the first round of voting in Parliament; of the 80 members present, 77 ballots were cast in support with three left blank. Amine Gemayel was widely regarded as more moderate than his brother. He never promised the Israelis anything in order to be elected president, but rather that he would follow the path of his brother, whatever that path was. He left his post in the Kataeb Party after the election. Once elected, he refused to meet any Israeli official.

=== Legal proceedings ===
Habib Shartouni was held for eight years in Roumieh prison without an official trial, before escaping during the final Syrian offensive that marked the end of the Lebanese Civil War. In the 1990s, he admitted his part in the assassination. In interviews with Lebanese newspaper al-Akhbar in the 2010s, Shartouni stated that after his escape, he resided in Syria, but did not disclose his whereabouts at the time. He also denied visiting Lebanon since his escape from prison.

During the third trial of Shartouni in 2017, protests by supporters of both the SSNP and the Kataeb Party blocked the road in front of the Justice Palace. A SSNP member interviewed by Al-Jadeed said Shartouni was "a hero the size of a nation". On 20 October, the Judicial Council, Lebanon's highest state security court, sentenced Shartouni and Nabil Alam to death in absentia and stripped them of their civil rights.

== See also ==
- 1982 Lebanon War
- List of extrajudicial killings and political violence in Lebanon
