= Fouad Abou Nader =

Lebanese politician

Fouad Abou Nader فؤاد أبو ناضر

Leader of LF
- In office 1984–1985
- Preceded by: Fadi Frem
- Succeeded by: Elie Hobeika

Personal details
- Born: June 27, 1956 (age 70) Baskinta, Lebanon

Fouad Abou Nader (Arabic: فؤاد أبو ناضر, romanized: Fūʾād ʾAbū Nādir) is a Lebanese Christian politician and former leader of the Lebanese Forces. A nephew of the Kataeb Party founder Pierre Gemayel, Abou Nader became a Kataeb party activist and head of the elite Kataeb troop called the "BG" (.ب.ج) and later the head of the Lebanese Forces after the forceful and bloody union of various Christian military groupings. After an internal revolt in the Lebanese Forces led by Elie Hobeika and Samir Geagea against his leadership, he relinquished his power to them, refusing to fight in what he considered a fratricide venture.

Abou Nader remained active in the Lebanese Forces veterans group and return briefly to the Kataeb party. The party was marred at the time by deep divisions between various factions, and Nader eventually left. He later established his own political movement, Liberty Front, that he heads as general coordinator.

Nader was seriously injured in 1975, 1976 and 1983 in fights against Palestinians and Syrians. In 1986, he survived an assassination attempt but was severely wounded. In the late 1980s, he also established a medical and paramedical engineering firm.

== Early life ==
Nader was born in Baskinta, (Metn, Mount-Lebanon, Lebanon) on June 27, 1956 to Antoine Abou Nader and Claude Pierre Gemayel, a family of Christian Maronites.

After attending school at Collège Notre-Dame de Jamhour and Collège Mont La Salle, he joined the American University of Beirut. Because of the war, he continued his medical studies at the Université Saint-Joseph, and graduated as a doctor in 1982.

== Kataeb Party ==
He joined the Kataeb Social Democratic Party (led by his grandfather Sheikh Pierre Gemayel) in 1974. He was an active member of both the paramilitary and the students’ organization of the party. At Dekwaneh, he participated in his first fight against the Palestinian organizations.

== Role in the Lebanese Forces ==
When war started, he was part of the “BG” (or “BE GiM”), the elite division of the Kataeb regular forces. When the Kataeb Regulatory Forces (KRF), the Tigers Militia (“Noumour”) from the National Liberal Party, the “Guardians of the Cedars” from the National Lebanese Movement and the “Al-Tanzim” (“the Organization”) from the Lebanese Resistance Movement united to form the “Lebanese Forces” (LF), he became the head of the operations division of the LF (called the “Third Bureau”). He sustained serious injuries in 1975, 1976, and 1983. In 1986, he was severely wounded in an assassination attempt but survived.

In 1982, Bachir Gemayel, commander in chief of the LF, was elected president of the Lebanese Republic. Following his election, Fadi Frem became commander in chief of the LF, and Nader became the LF's chief of staff. In 1984, he was elected as commander in chief of the LF. He was involved in most of the battles fought by the LF and the Resistance against various Palestinian organizations and the Syrian army.

== Power struggles and withdrawal from the Lebanese Forces ==
Beginning in 1985, an era of “intifada” (revolts) shook the “free regions” and developed into a struggle for power. Nader refused to engage in the struggle, and did not attempt to quell the intifada led by Elie Hobeika and Samir Geagea to remove him from power. He said:

"When I offer my condolences to the family of a martyr as head of the LF, I feel bad even if their son was sacrificed for the noblest of causes. What do you want me to say tomorrow to all these mothers? How [will I] explain the martyrdom of their children? Just to remain in my position as head of the LF?”

In 1986, he refused to recognize the tripartite agreement signed in Damascus by Elie Hobeika, and became responsible for the Kataeb regional. In 1989, he rejected the Taif agreement signed by Georges Saade, the head of the Kataeb Social Democratic Party and approved by Samir Geagea. He supported Michel Aoun’s liberation war against the Syrian army but rejected what he considered a fratricide war between the Lebanese Army soldiers loyal to General Aoun, and Geagea’s militia. Nader participated in the mass demonstrations in Baabda (where the presidential palace is located) against the Taef agreement and the invasion by the Syrian army.

== Lebanese Forces Veterans Group and return to Kataeb ==
During the Syrian occupation he assisted the student Resistance and participated in their major demonstrations. He was also part of the "Kataeb Opposition" led by Elie Karame, the former head of the Kataeb, against the pro-Syrian direction the Kataeb party was taking under the leadership of Georges Saadeh and later Mounir El Hajj and Karim Pakradouni. After the assassination of Rafic Hariri, he participated in the mass demonstrations in downtown Beirut calling for the departure of the Syrian army.

After the Syrian withdrawal, Nader restarted his public activities by launching the "Lebanese Forces Veterans Group" with his former comrades. He also returned to the Kataeb party with the goal of enforcing changes to avoid repeating past mistakes. His ideas for change involved enforcing a greater degree of democratic process in order to prevent struggles for power, in addition to redefining the party's platform. His position quickly led to clashes with many leaders of the party who were opposed to change in the feudal and hereditary structure that was in place.

== Establishment of the Liberty Front ==
In April 2007, in the face of opposition within the Kataeb party, Nader decided to launch the "Liberty Front" party together with allies from within his former party, as well as from other parties and movements. He founded the Liberty Front as a social-democratic and independent Lebanese political movement, heir to the "Front for Freedom & Man" founded in 1976 by Charles Malik. The Liberty Front is intended to be the political offspring of the Resistance of the Front's parties, in addition to movements fighters who cooperated in the Lebanese Forces Command Council. The party is opposed to divisive struggles and calls for Christian unity. In October 2008, Nader was re-elected as general coordinator of the Liberty Front.

== Positions ==
Nader has said that friendly relations with either Syria or Israel will be difficult to attain in the near future, "but definitely in the end we have to find a resolution. Why can’t we achieve peace between our countries? Our peace has to be fair between the Israelis and us and between Syria and us as well."

On the division of Christians and Muslims in Lebanon, Nader said: "[I am] 100% for keeping this coexistence between Christians and Muslims in Lebanon, but the political formula of how to implement it must be changed. We would like to find a final solution for the problems of the country. Otherwise we are going to stay in this situation. We cannot go on like this for all of our lives. We have to try a stable solution for the sake of our kids. We don't want our kids to continue the war we have fought. We want to find a final solution. Rule number one is that we have to stop lying to each other. Number two, we have to start thinking Lebanese only. And, rule number three, we need to sit together and find a solution – without a hidden agenda from either side. Everyone in Lebanon, Christians, Sunnis, Shiites, Druze, Alawi, Jews, etc. can live free with dignity and enjoy security, equality and freedom."

Regarding the Memorandum of Understanding between Aoun's Free Patriotic Movement and Hezbollah, he stated: "It's a positive step although I don't agree with the objectives of Hezbollah and its foreign agenda." As a defense strategy, Nader supports the forming of a “national guard”, a regionally organized armed force that would fight alongside the Lebanese army and the Interior Security Forces (I.S.F.). He supports integrating Hezbollah Resistance weapons and fighters into the national system, but also calls for new volunteers from across all of the various regions and sects.
