= Edgar Maalouf =

Lebanese politician and general

Edgar Maalouf إدغار معلوف
- Born: 21 March 1934; Beirut, French Lebanon
- Died: 28 December 2018 (aged 84); Switzerland
- Occupation: Politician

Edgar Maalouf (Arabic: إدغار معلوف, romanized: ʾIdghār Maʿlūf; 21 March 1934 – 28 December 2018) was a Lebanese politician and former army general.

== Biography ==
Maalouf was appointed leader of Lebanon's temporary government in 1988, replacing Amine Gemayel. Maalouf served in different cabinet posts, including minister of finance (1988-1989), minister of oil and industry, minister of tourism, minister of public health, minister of social affairs, minister of labor, and minister of public works.

After Aoun's military defeat, Maalouf was exiled to Switzerland, as his wife was half Swiss. He would stay there until May 2005, when Syria's occupation of Lebanon finally ended. Michel Aoun accompanied him in his return.

A month later, he was elected to the Lebanese Parliament, representing the Matn District as a member of the Free Patriotic Movement and a Greek Catholic. He was elected to the Parliamentary Assembly of the Mediterranean in June 2007, where he would serve until his retirement in 2018.

Edgar Maalouf died on 28 December 2018.
