= Boutros Khawand =

Lebanese politician

Boutros Khawand (Arabic: بطرس خوند, romanized: Buṭrus Khawand, born 1940 in Kattin) was a member of the political bureau of the Lebanese Kataeb party and one of the cofounders of its military council in 1975. He was kidnapped in front of his house in Horch Tabet on September 15, 1992.

== Background ==
Boutros Khawand began his political career in the Kataeb party in 1956. He held several key positions within the party in which he was one of the co-founders. In 1976, he became the confident of the elected Lebanese president Bachir Gemayel. In 1982, Khawand was elected to the presidency of the Military Council and the political bureau of the Kataeb party (the largest Christian party in the Middle East), He held the latter position until his kidnapping on September 15, 1992. He was known to have a strong and well-respected relations with all Lebanese leaders specially with president Amine Gemayel as well as the president of the Lebanese forces (Dr. Samir Geagea).

== Kidnapping ==
On September 15, 1992, at 9:10 AM, Khawand was heading to the Kataeb Party headquarters in Beirut when his car was intercepted by two BMW cars and one red van, 1 km away from his home. Between eight and ten gunmen were in the attacking squad. They pulled him out of his car and forced him into the van and rushed him to an unknown destination. It is known at the time that the Syrian military ruled Lebanon with a strong presence in the area where Khawand was abducted.

== Captivity ==
It is widely believed that he is still alive in one of the Syrian jails, most probably in Tadmor prison or in the "Sab'h Bahrat" (Seven Seas) prison controlled by the Syrian Air Force intelligence service; however, some reports stated that he was later transferred to Al-Hasakah prison.

== Fate ==
On 18 September 2021, Abbas Ibrahim promised to uncover the fate of Boutros Khawand.

== See also ==
- Kataeb Regulatory Forces
- Lebanese Civil War
- Lebanese Forces
- Lebanese Forces (Militia)
- List of kidnappings
- List of Lebanese in Syrian Jails
- List of people who disappeared mysteriously (2000–present)
