= War of Liberation (1989–1990) =

Sub-conflict within the final phase of the Lebanese Civil War

- Part of the Lebanese Civil War & Assadist–Saddamist conflict
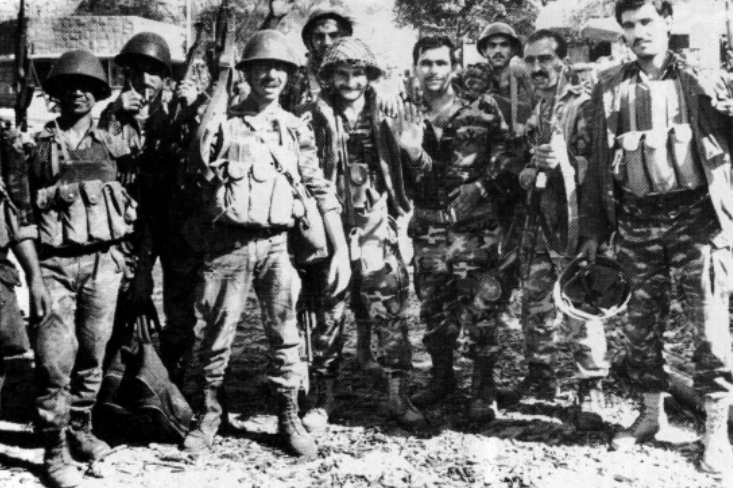
- Syrian Arab Army soldiers at the presidential palace in Baabda, 1990.
Date	March 1989 – 13 October 1990 (1 year, 7 months and 5 days)
Location	Greater Beirut region and surroundings, Lebanon
Result	Syrian-allied victory: Syrian occupation of Northern and Eastern Lebanon until 2005.; Lebanese Armed Forces loyal to Aoun surrender to Syrian Arab Armed Forces.; Lebanese Forces reliniquish its military arsenal to Hrawi's pro-Syrian Lebanese Government and disbands as a militia.; Aoun forced into exile and Geagea imprisoned in following years.

Belligerents
(Lebanon) Lebanese Army (pro-Aoun faction)	Syria (Lebanon) Lebanese Army (pro-Hrawi faction); LFEC; SSNP-L; Supported by: LNRF (Palestine) PNSF	Lebanese Forces; Supported by: Kataeb Party; Iraq (Palestine) PLO

Commanders and leaders
(Lebanon) Michel Aoun (surrendered) (Lebanon) Issam Abu Jamra (surrendered) (Lebanon) Edgar Maalouf (surrendered)	(Ba'athist Syria) Hafez al-Assad (Ba'athist Syria) Ghazi Kanaan (Lebanon) Elias Hrawi (Lebanon) Émile Lahoud; Elie Hobeika	Samir Geagea; Fouad Malek; Boutros Khawand; Hanna Atik

Strength
(Lebanon) 15,000	(Ba'athist Syria) 40,000 (Lebanon) 10,000; 2,000; 10,000	10,000

Casualties and losses
- 500–750 killed during the fighting Additionally at least 250 unarmed prisoners executed, including civilians

The War of Liberation (Arabic: حرب التحرير) was a sub-conflict within the final phase of the Lebanese Civil War between 1989 and 1990, in which the Lebanese Army loyal to General and Prime Minister Michel Aoun, appointed by previous President Amine Gemayel and headquartered in eastern Beirut, fought against the western Beirut-based Syrian Armed Forces and the Lebanese Army loyal to President Elias Hrawi and Prime Minister Salim el-Hoss, appointed by the Taif Agreement. Aoun launched several offensives against the Lebanese Forces in an attempt to establish his authority over East Beirut. The conflict culminated on 13 October 1990, when the Syrian Army stormed Baabda Palace and other strongholds of Aoun, killing hundreds of Lebanese soldiers and civilians and ousting Aoun, marking the end of the Lebanese Civil War. Aoun survived and moved to France to live in exile.

== Background ==
The Lebanese Civil War began in 1975, and in 1976 Syria began an occupation of parts of Lebanon. In 1989, various Lebanese Factions signed the Taif Agreement in an attempt to end the Civil War, but Michel Aoun opposed the agreement, since it did not provide a deadline for the withdrawal of Syrian troops.

=== Leaders involved ===
In East Beirut, Aoun's provisional government consisted of himself (prime minister), Colonel Issam Abu Jamra (Greek Orthodox), and Brigadier General Edgar Maalouf (Greek Catholic). President Gemayel's decree, signed 15 minutes before his term expired, on 22 September 1988, also included three Muslim ministers (Sunni, Shiite, Druze), but all three rejected the posts and immediately resigned. Despite this, Aoun insisted he was the legal Prime Minister.

In West Beirut, Hrawi's government consisted of a cabinet equally divided between Christians and Muslims, with el-Hoss as Prime Minister. The Commander-in-chief of the LAF, General Émile Lahoud, had been appointed on 28 November 1989. In March 1990, the cabinet selected General Elie Hayek as commander of the Mount Lebanon region.

The Lebanese Forces (LF) - headed by Samir Geagea - were headquartered in La Quarantaine (directly bordering Achrafieh from the East), and were in control of East Beirut, the coastal Metn and Baabda. They held the entire districts (cazas) of Keserwan, Jbeil, Bcharri, and parts of Batroun, Koura, and Zgharta.

== Events ==
=== War begins ===
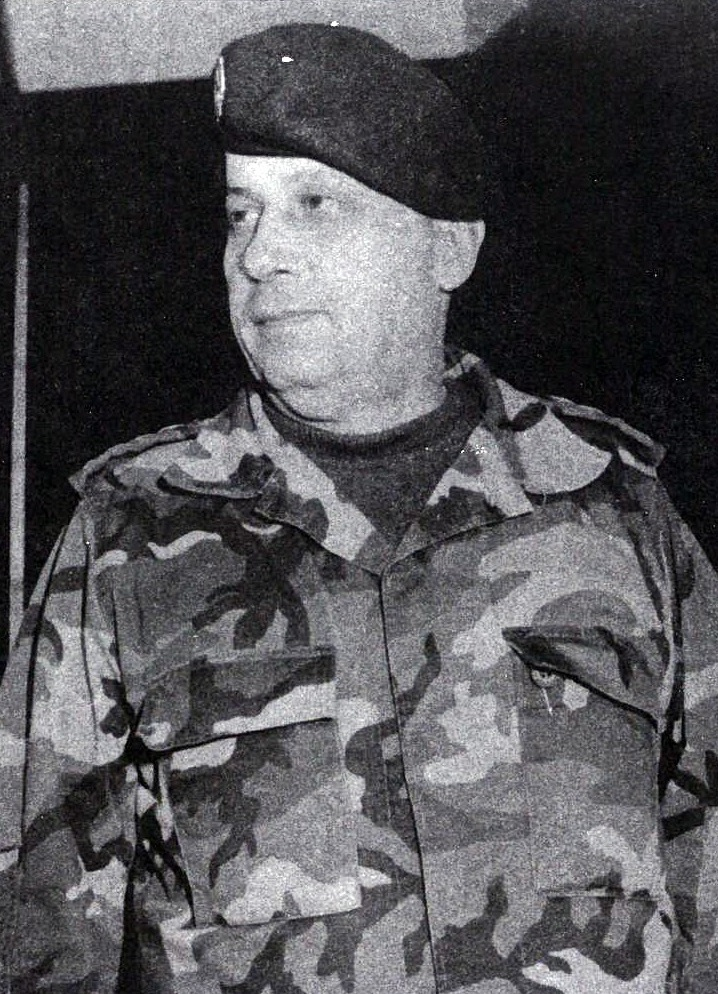
Michel Aoun during the Lebanese Civil War

On 15 February 1989 General Aoun launched an offensive, with those Lebanese Army Brigades loyal to him (30% of whom were Sunni), against Geagea's Lebanese Forces (LF) positions around Christian East Beirut. At the time it was estimated that Aoun's portion of the army amounted to 16,000 men, while the LF had 10,000; both sides were equipped with tanks and heavy artillery. Nine days later, 24 February, with seventy people killed and the intervention of the Maronite Patriarchate, the LF agreed to hand over to Aoun control of Beirut's port's fifth basin with its estimated $300,000 per month tax revenue. Suleiman Frangieh, in the north, also returned control of Ras Salaata port in Batroun District The following month Aoun launched a blockade against the unregulated seaports south of Beirut at Jieh and Khalde. On the 8th of March 1989, Aoun's patrol boats intercepted a boat heading for PSP controlled port at Jieh. This precipitated a series of indiscriminate artillery barrages, with Amal shelling East Beirut harbour and Jounieh port, and Aoun's army brigades shelling Souq El Gharb. On the 12 March Aoun ordered the closure of Beirut International Airport and two days later launched an hour long bombardment of West Beirut which killed 40 civilians. At the end of the month Aoun announced a ceasefire with the issue of the militia-run ports unresolved. The area had seen the worst violence for three years with over 90 people killed and several hundred wounded.

=== Aoun under siege ===
In April 1989, as General Aoun continued to blockade the militia sea-ports South of Beirut, the Syrian Army and their proxy militia, the Druze PSP, began intermittent shelling of Beirut harbour and the ports at Jounieh and Byblos. Simultaneously the Arab League was making intense efforts to establish a truce between Aoun and Syria. On the 4 April Kuwait's Foreign Minister flew to Damascus for talks. On 19 April twenty-three Christian Members of Parliament called for a cease fire. Ignoring this appeal the Lebanese Forces (LF) in East Beirut joined in the exchanges of fire. At the start of the month there was a massive fire at a fuel depot in Dora, close to Beirut harbour. The sound of one of the liquid gas containers exploding was heard 40km away in Sidon. Civilians had begun to leave both sides of Beirut. It was reported that 10,000 Beirut residents had arrived in Limasol in the six weeks to the end of April. The Arab League called for a three month truce and an end of the ports blockade but continued shelling of East Beirut by the PSP ensured that the truce did not hold and the exchanges of fire grew in intensity. On 16 May 1989 Grand Mufti Hassan Khaled, spiritual leader of Lebanon's Sunni Muslims, was assassinated while being driven through Beirut by a car bomb which killed at least 20 other people.

By late June Aoun's gunners were launching barrages against Syrian positions which lasted for 5–7 hours. The area under his control was blockaded by land and sea. In June an oil tanker was destroyed off Jouneh. The Arab League peace initiative, led by Algeria, Saudi Arabia and Morocco, managed to get Iraq to stop selling weapons to Aoun and the following month a shipment of 50 Frog missiles was intercepted in Aqaba. On 4 July a truce allowed the opening of the crossings between East and West Beirut for the first time in three months. The airport remained closed because of the threat of Aoun's guns and two Syrian frigates were maintaining the blockade. Daily shelling continued, mostly from Syrian positions. The electricity supply in the city was reduced to one hour a day and there was an acute shortage of fuel.

On 17 July the LF joined forces with Aoun to launch a blitz on West Beirut in which ‘scores’ were killed. With nightly artillery exchanges continuing the Arab League announced on 31 July that they had ended their efforts to end the conflict. On 10 August the Syrians launched a massive artillery offensive on targets in the Christian enclave, culminating three days later in a PSP ground offensive against Aoun's positions in Souq El Gharb overlooking the palace at Baabda and the Ministry of Defence at Yarze. The attack failed with 20–30 PSP men killed. Aoun's forces retaliated by bombarding Syrian positions in the Beqaa Valley. Two weeks later, 29 August, the Sun Shield, a Danish registered fuel tanker was hit by shellfire, caught fire and sank in Jouneh bay. Nine crew members were killed.

It was estimated that by this time only between 10% and 15% of the civilian population remained in Beirut. There had been no water or electricity for two weeks.

On 6 September 1989, without prior announcement American Ambassador John Thomas McCarthy and 29 staff were airlifted out of the US embassy in Aoun's enclave. Police counts for the previous six months gave 828 people killed and 2,455 wounded.

In September 1989 Saudi Arabia presented a seven-point peace plan which Aoun accepted and on 22 September a cease fire was announced and Beirut airport was re-opened having been closed for six months. People began returning to the city and schools re-opened on 10 October. The Syrian blockade of fuel for the city's power station in the Christian enclave meant there was only electricity for two hours a day. Meanwhile sixty-two members of parliament, half Christian and half Muslim, were meeting in Taif. After three weeks of negotiations they came to an agreement which Aoun rejected on 22 October. Dany Chamoun, one of Aoun's loyal supporters, was in favour of the deal. George Saadeh, leader of the Kataeb Party (the political wing of the LF), had been one of the key Christian negotiators in Taif. In an attempt to derail the Taif timetable, on 3 November, Aoun announced that he was dissolving parliament and tens of thousands of his supporters took to the streets. Thousands gathered around the Presidential palace in Baabda and a large group invaded the Maronite headquarters in Bkerké where they abused the Patriarch, Nasrallah Sfeir. Geagea sent two hundred LF militiamen to protect the Kataeb radio station, Voice of Lebanon. On 5 November an assembly of members of Parliament, including thirty arriving from exile in Paris, met in Qoleiat air base North Lebanon, and elected René Moawad as President. He was recognised by the International Community as the legitimate President of Lebanon but was killed by a car bomb seventeen days later. Twenty-three other people were killed in the explosion. During December thousands remained encamped in Baabda acting as a human shield around Aoun.

=== War of Elimination ===
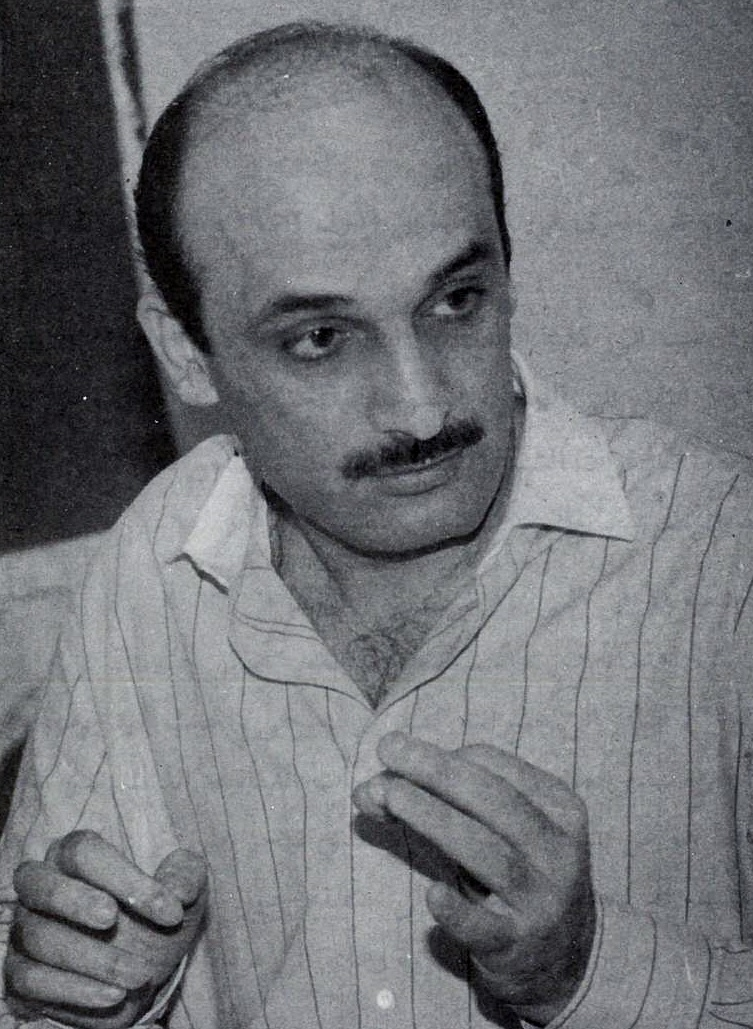
Samir Geagea (1988)

On 31 January 1990, General Aoun launched an offensive against the Lebanese Forces (LF), led by Samir Geagea, in East Beirut. The two week offensive brought destruction and casualties, 500 killed and 2,000 wounded, that East Beirut had not seen during the Civil War or the Israeli invasion. Aoun could only depend on battalions from 3 loyal Brigades, the 5th, 8th and 10th. It had been anticipated that the LF would be defeated in 48 hours but Aoun's troops were only able to capture Dbayeh on 6 February. On 15 February Aoun's forces resumed their attack, capturing Ain El Remmaneh and Furn al-Chibbak. Once again there was massive destruction of property. The LF forces escaped via Syrian controlled West Beirut. Two days later, 17/18 February, a truce was agreed to allow 200 of Aoun's elite commands to leave their base at Adma airfield where they had been trapped since the start of the fighting. The battles left Geagea's fighters in control of East Beirut and the harbour, as well as Kisrawan and Jbeil provinces. On 24 February an unidentified naval patrol boat attacked the Larnaca-Jounieh ferry ordering it to turn back to Cyprus. One passenger was killed and 17 wounded. Another unsuccessful attack was launched against the East Beirut suburb Sin el Fil, 1 March, and a week later, despite continued sniping and occasional clashes and with the frontline running along the Dog River and around East Beirut, Aoun announced a unilateral ceasefire and his willingness to enter negotiations.

The war became known as the war of elimination (حرب الإلغاء), a term used by the LF denoting the act of war launched by General Aoun to try to "eliminate" it, but Aoun used another term; Weapon Unification Battle (معركة توحيد البندقية), meaning to unify and submit all the arms in Lebanon into the hand of the Lebanese Army.

=== LF hands over territory to Hrawi Government ===
On 1 April 1990, Hrawi's government mandated Fleet Admiral Elie Hayek (who had been appointed commander of the Mount Lebanon region by the cabinet on 11 March) to take over LF barracks in the governorate. This was part of an agreement between Geagea and Hrawi whereby the army would militarily and politically take over 2/3 of the Christian canton (the remaining 1/3 being the Northern governorate and Achrafieh in East Beirut), but the militia's 10,000 strong force would remain intact for the time being.

Aoun, however, had publicly stated that he would not accept the handoff or any alliance between the LF and the Hraoui government. As the Elimination War was ravaging East Beirut and its suburbs (up to the Metn), the handoff actually began in Keserwan district – at the level of Nahr el-Kalb – up to Barbara.

By May, however, the LF had taken over the entire coastline from Jounieh to Beirut from Aoun's troops, completely cutting off naval supply routes. In addition, Geagea placed Hayek in an LF barrack in Jounieh as a symbol of his willingness to integrate with the government, defying Aoun's refusal of any Hrawi-LF alliance. These developments, combined with the Syrian army's support, dramatically shifted the odds in favour of the Taef agreement and its government.

=== Defeat - October 1990 ===
On the evening of 1 October 1990 several hundred people gathered for a candlelit vigil on the edge of the enclave around the Presidential Palace at Ba’abda. General Aoun had been besieged in the Palace for two years and the demonstration was a response to a new blockade imposed by the Hrawi government on the Aounist areas. Gunmen opened fire on the crowd with automatic weapons. Twenty-five people were killed and up to a hundred injured, some in the stampede that followed. The US State Department and Western diplomats were of the opinion that Geagea's Lebanese Forces were responsible for the shooting. Eleven days later, 12 October, a lone gunman fired two shots at General Aoun whilst he was addressing a crowd outside the palace. Aoun was not hit but one of his bodyguards was killed. Early on the morning of Saturday 13 October the general took refuge in the nearby French Embassy. At 7.00am a pair of Syrian Sukhoi Su-7s made two bombing runs over the palace. At 8.30am General Aoun made a broadcast from the French Embassy calling on his troops to surrender. At the same time he telephoned his officers in the palace asking them to keep resisting for another four or five hours.

There followed a series of atrocities. Soldiers in the Palace displayed white flags but then opened fire on Syrian soldiers approaching, killing 150. Once they had overcome the defenders the Syrians executed perhaps as many as 80 them. With Aoun gone all resistance collapsed. On the Metn the Syrian army used breakaway Lebanese Forces fighters commanded by the Elie Hobeika as well as members of the Syrian Social Nationalist Party to take over Aounist positions. The fighting was accompanied by murders, looting and rape. An estimated 800 combatants and civilians were killed. A week later, 21 October, Dany Chamoun, another militia leader and major Aoun supporter, was murdered along with his wife and two of their children.

When the Syrian army took over the Ministry of Defence building they removed all the Deuxième Bureau (Military Intelligence) files.

Aoun's wife and three daughters were allowed to leave the country. On arrival in Paris $200,000 cash was found in their entourage's luggage.

== Aftermath ==
The attack on the Aoun government marked the end of the Lebanese Civil War. Syria would dominate the political life of the country for the following 15 years, under the auspices of the Taif Agreement.

On 16 October 1990, militias in Beirut began dismantling the Green Line, and on 13 November they completed their withdrawal from Beirut, before the 19 November deadline provided by the Taif agreement.

== Literature ==
- William Harris, Faces of Lebanon. Sects, Wars, and Global Extensions (Markus Wiener Publishers, Princeton, USA 1996)
