= Fadi Frem =

Lebanese politician

Fadi Frem فادي أفرام

Leader of LF
- In office 1982–1984
- Preceded by: Bachir Gemayel
- Succeeded by: Fouad Abou Nader

Personal details
- Born: 1953 (age 71–72); Achrafieh, Beirut, Lebanon

Fadi Frem (Arabic: فادي أفرام, born 1953 in Achrafieh, Beirut, Lebanon) is the former leader of the Lebanese Forces Christian militia and political party. He is married to Lena Abou Nader, the grand daughter of Pierre Gemayel. He holds a degree in mechanical engineering from the American University of Beirut, Masters in Industrial Engineering from Texas A & M, and an MBA from Harvard Business School.

He started his military service in 1969 following incidents which he fought against the Palestine Liberation Organization (PLO) in Lebanon. He was one of the founding members of the BG Unit and fought against the PLO again in 1975. In 1978, he was appointed into the military intelligence. On September 13, 1982, one day before Lebanese Forces leader and former Lebanese President Bashir Gemayel was killed, Fadi was appointed leader of the Lebanese Forces. He stayed leader of the Lebanese Forces until the election of Fouad Abou Nader.
