= Lebanese Youth Movement (MKG) =

Far Right Lebanese militia active during the Lebanese Civil War

Lebanese Youth Movement (MKG) حركة الشباب اللبنانية
- Flag of the Lebanese Youth Movement (MKG) (1969–1977)
- Leaders: Maroun Naim el-Khoury ("Bash Maroun"); Jean el-Khoury
- Dates active: 1973–1977
- Headquarters: Dekwaneh, East Beirut
- Active regions: East Beirut, Mount Lebanon
- Ideology: Lebanese nationalism Ultranationalism; Phoenicianism; Anti-communism; Anti-Palestinianism
- Political position: Far-right
- Size: 1,500 fighters
- Part of: Lebanese Front; Lebanese Forces
- Wars: Lebanese Civil War

The Lebanese Youth Movement – LYM (Arabic: حركة الشباب اللبنانية | Harakat al-Shabab al-Lubnaniyya), also known as the Maroun Khoury Group (MKG), was a Christian militia which fought in the 1975-77 phase of the Lebanese Civil War.

== Origins ==
The LYM/MKG was founded in 1969 by Maroun Naim el-Khoury (nom de guerre "Bash Maroun") and his brother Jean el-Khoury, sons of the former head of the Kataeb Party's section (Arabic: qism) in the Dekwaneh district of East Beirut, Naim el-Khoury. It was originally created as an association of mainly Maronite right-wing university students that strongly opposed the Cairo Agreement and the presence of Palestine Liberation Organization (PLO) guerrilla factions in Lebanon, being involved in gathering the Dekwaneh residents regardless of their religion and arming them with obsolete firearms in order to defend themselves against the perceived "Palestinian threat."

In 1973, the LYM/MKG sent 200 male and female members to a secret training camp at Kfour, in the Keserwan District, to receive military training. They also began to publish an official newspaper, "The Voice of the Movement" (Arabic: Sawt el-Harakat) and edited a magazine, "The Fighter" (Arabic: El-Moukatel). Later, the organization created its own motto and anthem: "We work to deserve Lebanon" (نعمل لنستحق لبنان).

During the pre-conflict phase in 1974, when armed clashes between the Lebanese Army and the PLO guerrilla factions were becoming increasingly frequent, the LYM/MKG joined the Al-Tanzim in supporting the Army attempts to cut off the communications between the palestinian refugee camps of Tel el-Zaatar, Karantina, Jisr el-Basha, and Naba'a, which were being used by the PLO as weapons storage depots and training facilities.

== Political beliefs ==
Being violently anti-communist and anti-Palestinian, the LYM/MKG's own ideology stemmed from the extremist Phoenicist views espoused by the Guardians of the Cedars and the Al-Tanzim, groups to which they cultivated a close relationship in the immediate pre-civil war years.

== Military structure and organization ==
The LYM/MKG joined the Lebanese Front in January 1976 and raised its own militia with training, funds and weapons being provided by the Tigers Militia led by Camille Chamoun. Starting with just 500 men and women armed with obsolete weapons, by April 1975 the Movement's military wing eventually grew to about 1,500 fighters, backed by a small mechanized force made of ex-Lebanese Army armoured cars and gun trucks or 'technicals' armed with heavy machine guns and recoilless rifles. Personally commanded by Bash Maroun, they usually operated in the Ras-el-Dekwaneh, Ain El Remmaneh and Mansouriye districts, manning the local sections of the Green Line, but also fought in other areas (namely at the Battle of the Hotels), earning a reputation of fierce combatants.

== Controversy ==
However, they also became infamous for their brutality. In January–August 1976, a force of 100 LYM/MKG militiamen took part in the sieges and subsequent massacres of the Palestinian refugee situated at the coastal town of Dbayeh in the Matn District, and at Karantina, Al-Maslakh and Tel al-Zaatar in East Beirut. At the latter battle, the LYM/MKG intensified the blockade of the refugee camp by launching on 22 June a full-scale military assault that lasted for 35 days, and the cruelty displayed by LYM/MKG members' in this assault and other atrocities, earned them the unflattering nickname "The Ghosts of the Cemeteries" (Arabic: أشباح المقابر | 'Ashbah al-Maqabir) – Bash Maroun's men were normally seen wearing necklaces made from human body parts cut from their victims.

== Disbandement ==
The LYM/MKG was subsequently absorbed into the Lebanese Forces structure in 1977, thereafter ceasing to exist as an independent organization. Under LF command, they later again played a key role in the eviction of the Syrian Army out from the Christian-controlled East Beirut in February 1978 during the Hundred Days' War.

== Weapons and equipment ==
=== Armoured and transport vehicles ===
Like many Lebanese militias, the LYM/MKG fielded since January 1976 a mechanized corps consisting of ex-Lebanese Army Panhard AML-90 armoured cars and gun trucks or 'technicals'. The latter consisted of commandeered Land-Rover series II-III, Santana Series III (Spanish-produced version of the Land-Rover series III), Toyota Land Cruiser (J40), Dodge W200 Power Wagon, Dodge D series (3rd generation), GMC Sierra Custom K25/K30 and Chevrolet C-10/C-15 Cheyenne light pickups mounting heavy machine guns and recoilless rifles.

== See also ==
- Al-Tanzim
- Guardians of the Cedars
- Kataeb Regulatory Forces
- Lebanese Forces (militia)
- Lebanese Front
- Lebanese Civil War
- List of weapons of the Lebanese Civil War
- Tel al-Zaatar Massacre
- Karantina Massacre
- Kataeb Regulatory Forces
- Phoenicianism
