= Al-Tanzim =

Christian Lebanese militia active during the Lebanese Civil War

Lebanese Resistance Movement - The Organization
- حركة المقاومة اللبنانية - التنظيم
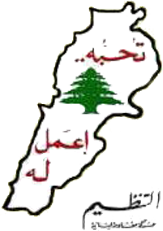
- al-Tanzim logo from 1970 to 1990
- Leader: Obeid Zwein
- Dates active: 1969–1990
- Headquarters: Achrafieh (Beirut), Dekwaneh
- Active regions: East Beirut, Mount Lebanon
- Ideology: Lebanese nationalism Ultranationalism; Phoenicianism; Anti-communism; Anti-Palestinianism
- Political position: Far-right
- Status: Disbanded
- Size: 1,500 fighters
- Part of: Lebanese Front; Lebanese Forces
- Wars: Lebanese Civil War

Al-Tanzim, Al-Tanzym or At-Tanzim (Arabic: حركة المقاومة اللبنانية - التنظيم, lit. 'Lebanese Resistance Movement - The Organization') was the name of a secret military society and militia set up by Christian activists in Lebanon at the early 1970s, and which came to play an important role in the Lebanese Civil War.

== Emblem ==
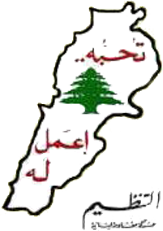
Al-Tanzim logo

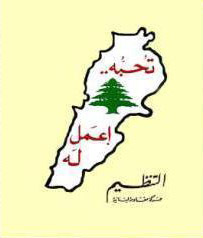
Al-Tanzim logo (alternate version)

The emblem of the group, a map of Lebanon with a cedar tree at the center, with the phrase "You love it, work for it" written below, was designed in 1970 during an expedition made by the Tanzim to the village of Kfarchouba in Hasbaya District, Nabatieh Governorate, in order to assist the affected population in the reconstruction effort, following an Israeli Air Force (IAF) air raid in Southern Lebanon. Kfarchouba is a mainly Muslim village in Southern Lebanon and this act symbolized the Nationalist yet Secular ideals of the Tanzim.

== Origins ==
The Tanzim was first formed in 1969 by a small group of young Lebanese Army officers who contested the Cairo agreement, which led them to break away from the Kataeb Party or 'Phalange' in the late 1960s in protest for the latter's initial refusal to engage in nationwide military training and arming of the Lebanese population in order to "defend Lebanon" from the perceived "Palestinian threat". Under the leadership of Obad Zouein, the breakaway group comprised Aziz Torbey, Samir Nassif, and Fawzi Mahfouz (also known as 'Abu Roy') – all were former militants of the Kataeb's youth section and veterans of the 1958 Lebanon crisis – who decided therefore to create an underground paramilitary organization to support the Lebanese Army in the defense of the Country.

Shortly after its creation, the group moved to Beirut where they opened an office at the mainly Greek-Orthodox quarter of Achrafieh, and began to recruit early on civilian members outside the Army – particularly individuals such as Milad Rizkallah, who joined the Tanzim in 1970 – mostly from the upper and professional middle-classes, including former members of the Maronite League. The civilian cadres proved instrumental in providing the new Movement with a political structure and program, embodied in 1970–71 with the creation of the Tanzim's political wing, which began their activities under the covert title Movement of the Cedars – MoC (Arabic: حركة الارز | Harakat al-Arz) or Mouvement des Cedres (MdC) in French.

== Structure and organization ==
Since its inception, the Tanzim initially rejected the monocentric leadership structure typical of the traditional political parties in Lebanon by adopting a collegial decision-making board – the "Commanding Council" (Arabic: مجلس القيادة | Al-Majlis al-Kiyadi) – the first ever to emerge in Lebanon. Yet, such collective leadership system did not prevent the rise of prominent figures who dominated the movement's leadership like the physician Dr. Fuad Chemali, together with his colleague Dr. Jean Fares in 1972, succeeded by the lawyer Georges Adwan in 1973. Involved since 1969 in the clandestine military training of Christian volunteers in secret camps such as Fatqa and later on Tabrieh, both located in the mountains of the Keserwan District, in collusion with the Kataeb Party, the MoC in the early 1970s began to quietly raise its own military wing, whose military headquarters was established in the predominately Maronite Dekwaneh District of East Beirut. Although by 1977 more than 15,000 young men and women had trained at the above-mentioned facilities (the majority of them joined the ranks of the other Christian militias), the movement only proceeded to recruit very few out of this total, due to three main reasons:

1- The secret nature of such training, which rendered the selection process very delicate;

2- The limited financial resources available to the group, to a point that the volunteers had to cover their own training expenses by paying minimal fees.

3- The quality of men and women the Tanzim was looking for, and this reflected a lot on the clean reputation that the group maintained throughout the war, as well as having the lowest casualty rate, despite having its militia spearheading many difficult military engagements, mostly due to their mobility along the front.

The movement enjoyed a close relationship with the Lebanese Army since the mid-1970s, which made some observers to believe that the Army's predominantly Christian High Command was somewhat directly involved in the formation of the MoC.

At the outbreak of the 1975–76 civil war, the Tanzim forces were organized into autonomous mobile groups of several dozen fighters, with each being coded as "tanzim of the region x or y" (the organized group of region x or y). Deployed to different fronts and neighbourhoods, their mission was to be present wherever the fighting required them; hence the MoC/Tanzim was the only Christian-rightist militia that had attained such a degree of tactical mobility and discipline. Unlike the main Christian factions, the Tanzim was one of the few ideologically-committed groups – other than the Guardians of the Cedars – that never tried to establish its own fiefdom or canton, nor appears to have been involved in illegal financing activities such as drug trafficking or racketeering.

== List of MOC/Tanzim Commanders ==
- Fuad Chemali
- Jean Fares
- Georges Adwan
- Nagib Zouein
- Obad Zouein
- Aziz Torbey
- Samir Nassif
- Fawzi Mahfouz (a.k.a. 'Abu Roy')
- Milad Rizkallah
- Roger Azzam
- Pierre Raffoul

== Political beliefs ==
Since its membership included militants of any political background and affiliation (Kataeb Party, Ahrar Party, etc. ...) or none whatsoever, the MoC/Tanzim claimed that what united them was their integrity and their common belief in the liberty and sovereignty of Lebanon as a country for all Lebanese. In reality, they were a predominately Maronite and Phoenicianist-oriented organization, being violently anti-communist, staunchly pro-western, and very hostile towards Pan-Arabism, distrusting the ideas of any equitable coexistence with the Lebanese Muslim population, characteristics which reflected on its program and politics. In the early 1970s, the movement adhered to an extreme Lebanonist ideology akin to that of the Guardians of the Cedars (GoC), with whom they developed a close political partnership. Not only the Tanzim shared with the latter the same radical views regarding the Palestinian presence – and later Syria's role – in Lebanon, but also went as far as adopting the Lebanese language written in the GoC's Latin script for their own official documents.

Fierce and disciplined fighters, they were involved in the January–August 1976 sieges and respective battles of Dbayeh, Karantina and Tel al-Zaatar refugee camps in East Beirut, allied with the Army of Free Lebanon, Tigers Militia, Kataeb Regulatory Forces, Guardians of the Cedars, Lebanese Youth Movement and the Tyous Team of Commandos.

== The Tanzim in the Lebanese Civil War ==
=== Early expansion phase 1975–76 ===
Tanzim militiamen made their first public appearance in May 1973 at Beirut during the Bourj el-Barajneh clashes, when the Lebanese Army High Command indirectly called them to assist regular troops in preventing PLO guerrillas from entering Army-controlled areas. It was not until the 1975–76 civil war however, that the MoC/Tanzim was faced with a situation where it had to carry out its own military operations to plug the gaps in the front. The discipline and organizational abilities displayed by the MoC at the opening months of the civil war, allowed the movement to engage in the formation of the Christian rightist parties and militias alliance that eventually would become in January 1976 the Lebanese Front. Conversely, its 200-strong Tanzim militia, led jointly by Fawzi Mahfouz and Obad Zouein, saw the heaviest street fighting ever in East Beirut, including the Battle of the Hotels and the sieges of Karantina and Tel al-Zaatar. At the later battle they reportedly contributed with 200 militiamen, allegedly Lebanese Army soldiers in disguise.

The Tanzim helped the Lebanese Army in January 1976, by volunteering ostensibly to defend and protect more than half a dozen army barracks located in the Christian districts of East Beirut, including the Defense Ministry and Army HQ complex at Yarze. Moreover, the movement saw this as an opportunity to expand its own military forces by attempting to incorporate defectors from the regular Army and seize weapons, equipment and vehicles from its barracks. Hence by March 1976 the Tanzim ranks swelled to 1,500 armed men and women backed by a small fleet of all-terrain vehicles or technicals and some transport trucks fitted with heavy machine-guns, recoilless rifles and Anti-Aircraft autocannons.

During that same month, they were heavily committed in the battles for the Mount Lebanon region, East Beirut, the Matn District and the Aley District against the Lebanese National Movement/Joint Forces' (LNM-JF) and Lebanese Arab Army's (LAA) "Spring offensive", being frequently employed as a "fire brigade" to fill gaps at the front, notably at Achrafieh, Tayyouneh-Lourdes, Kahale, Sin el Fil, and Ayoun es-Simane to name but a few, sustaining heavy casualties in the process. Integrated into the Lebanese Forces in 1977, Tanzim's militiamen later again played a key role in the eviction of the Syrian Army out from the Christian-controlled East Beirut in February 1978 during the Hundred Days' War, where they manned the Fayadieh-Yarze sector of the Green Line.

=== Reversals and re-organization 1976–79 ===
Syria's military intervention in June 1976, and its tacit endorsement by Georges Adwan (who combined the MoC's presidency with that of secretary-general of the Lebanese Front at the time), however, caused the movement to factionalize, splitting into a pro-Syrian element headed by Adwan himself and a radical anti-Syrian majority gathered around Mahfouz and Zouein. An attempted coup orchestrated by Adwan, in which the latter tried to take over the Tanzim Dekwaneh's military HQ resulted in a deep rift within the organization. Both Mahfouz and Zouein, which opposed Adwan's position and behaviour, played a crucial role in preventing further internal bloodshed among the group member's (despite the fact that Adwan had murdered Tony Khater, a fellow Tanzim member) by regaining control of the movement, and ousting Adwan from the MoC/Tanzim leadership board in late that year.

Eventually, the movement's representation in the Lebanese Forces' Command Council was subsequently bestowed by Bachir Gemayel upon Mahfouz, with Zouein being appointed the new Tanzim's secretary-general, and in 1977 the new leadership prudently allowed the Tanzim military wing to be absorbed into the Lebanese Forces. Although their numbers dwindled in the late 1970s, the MoC remained politically autonomous and managed to retain its position as one of the four partners in the Lebanese Front. In 1979 the movement finally went on public as a political party by declaring its manifesto at the inauguration ceremony of the Tabrieh cedar memorial (Arabic: غابد الشهيد | Ghabet el-Chahid) in honor of its 135 martyrs, presenting itself under the title Tanzim: Lebanese Resistance Movement – (T) LRM (Arabic: التنظيم: حركة المقاومة اللبنانية | Tanzim: Harakat al-Muqawama al-Lubnaniyyah) or Tanzim: Mouvement de Resistance Libanais (T-MRL) in French.

=== The later years 1979–1990 ===
With the political demise of the Lebanese Front in the late 1980s, the LRM began to take part in the foundation of the Central Bureau of National Coordination – CBNC (Arabic: المكتب المركزي للتنسيق الوطني | Al-Maktab al-Markazi lit-Tansiq al-Watani), best known as Bureau Central de Coordination Nationale (BCCN) in French, an umbrella organization regrouping several small, predominantly Christian political groupings and associations that rallied in support for General Michel Aoun's military interim government, with members of the Tanzim Commanding Council Roger Azzam and Pierre Raffoul rising to the leadership of the new force. Their vocal opposition to the Syrian-sponsored Taif Agreement led them to actively support Aoun's ill-fated Liberation War in 1989-1990, which forced the movement to go underground for some time and threw most of its leaders into exile.

Despite this, many former Tanzim members chose to remain in Lebanon and continued to carry out their militancy within the BCCN throughout the 1990s, later helping in the establishment of the Free Patriotic Movement (FPM), a wider anti-Syrian Christian political coalition led behind the scenes by the exiled Aoun. During the March 2005 Cedar Revolution, the BCCN-FPM alliance played once more an active part in the demonstrations that brought an end to the Syrian military presence in Lebanon.

Upon the return of Aoun from exile in April that year, the FPM was established as the official Aounist political party, an act that deprived the BCCN of its main raison d'être. Inevitably, the movement factionalized, and within a few months it announced publicly its own dissolution. Both the LRM – which virtually ceased its activities by the mid-1990s – and the At-Tanzim militia no longer exist.

== The Tanzim Party ==
The "Tanzim Party" (Arabic: حزب التنظيم | Hizb al-Tanzim) or "Parti du Tanzim" in French as its name implies, was a MoC/Tanzim splinter faction established by Georges Adwan shortly after being ousted from that organization's presidency in late 1976. Backed by Syria, the group was about 100-200 men-strong, backed by a few technicals equipped with HMGs and recoilless rifles, and operated from the Muslim-held sector of West Beirut. However, during the Hundred Days' War in February 1978, most of the "Tanzim Party" militiamen switched sides to rejoin their former party' comrades of the MoC/Tanzim militia and fought ferociously against Syrian Army troops at the Fayadieh and Yarze districts of East Beirut. Thus deprived of its fighting force, the "Tanzim Party" was gradually pushed to the sidelines and ceased its activities around the mid-1980s.

Adwan was able to survive politically though, and in 1989-1990 he even tried unsuccessfully to broker an agreement between Gen. Michel Aoun's Army and the Lebanese Forces led by Samir Geagea. After the war, he joined Geagea's Lebanese Forces Party, which allowed him to be elected in 2005 to the Lebanese Parliament as that party's deputy for the Chouf District. The "Tanzim Party" is no longer active.

== Weapons and equipment ==
Initially backed by the Lebanese Army – which provided training, some arms and ammunition –, the MoC/Tanzim also received covert funding and weapons from Jordan and Israel since September 1975, most of it being funneled through the Phalangists and the Maronite League. The collapse of the Lebanese Armed Forces (LAF) in January 1976 enabled the Tanzim militia to be re-equipped with a variety of modern small-arms and heavy weapons seized from LAF barracks or supplied by the Israelis.

=== Small arms ===
MoC/Tanzim militiamen were provided with a variety of small arms, including Mauser Karabiner 98k, Lee–Enfield SMLE Mk III and MAS-36 bolt-action rifles, MP 40, M1A1 Thompson and MAT-49 submachine guns, M2 carbines, MAS-49, M1 Garand (or its Italian-produced copy, the Beretta Model 1952), vz. 52 and SKS semi-automatic rifles, Heckler & Koch G3, FN FAL (variants included the Israeli-produced 'lightened' ROMAT), M16A1, Vz. 58, AK-47 and AKM assault rifles. Several models of handguns were used, including Tokarev TT-33, CZ 75, FN P35 and MAB PA-15 pistols. Squad weapons consisted of MG 34, MG 42, Chatellerault FM Mle 1924/29, M1918A2 BAR, Bren Mk. I .303 (7.7 mm), AA-52, RPD, RPK and FN MAG light machine guns, with heavier Browning M1919A4 .30 Cal, Browning M2HB .50 Cal, SG-43/SGM Goryunov and DShKM machine guns being employed as platoon and company weapons. Grenade launchers and portable anti-tank weapons comprised 88.9 mm Instalaza M65, RL-83 Blindicide, RPG-2 and RPG-7 anti-tank rocket launchers, whilst crew-served and indirect fire weapons consisted of M2 60 mm mortars, 82-PM-41 82 mm mortars and 120-PM-38 (M-1938) 120 mm heavy mortars, plus B-10 82 mm, B-11 107 mm and M40A1 106 mm recoilless rifles (often mounted on technicals).

=== Vehicles ===
The Tanzim raised early in the war a mechanized corps of technicals and Gun trucks, which consisted of US M151A1 and Willys M38A1 MD jeeps (or its civilian version, the Jeep CJ-5), Land-Rover series II-III, Santana Series III (Spanish-produced version of the Land-Rover series III), GMC Sierra Custom K25/K30 and Chevrolet C-10/C-15 Cheyenne light pickups, Dodge Power Wagon W200, Dodge D series (3rd generation) and Toyota Land Cruiser (J40) pickup trucks, plus Chevrolet C-50 medium-duty trucks, GMC C4500 medium-duty trucks, GMC C7500 heavy-duty trucks and US M35A2 2½-ton cargo trucks.

=== Artillery ===
They also fielded a small artillery branch, equipped mostly with anti-aircraft autocannons, such as Yugoslav Zastava M55 20 mm triple-barreled, Soviet ZPU (ZPU-1, ZPU-2, ZPU-4) 14.5 mm and ZU-23-2 23 mm pieces (mostly mounted on technicals and gun trucks), which were employed in the direct fire supporting role.

== See also ==
- Army of Free Lebanon
- Bachir Gemayel
- Battle of the Hotels
- Guardians of the Cedars
- Lebanese Civil War
- Lebanese Forces
- Lebanese Front
- List of weapons of the Lebanese Civil War
- Tigers Militia
- Tyous Team of Commandos
- Kataeb Regulatory Forces
- Maronite League
- Phoenicianism
