= Arab Deterrent Force =

Arab international peacekeeping mission (1976–1981) in the Lebanese Civil War

- Active: 1976–1982
- Country: Lebanon
- Type: Peacekeeping force
- Size: 35,000 men: Syria; Libya; Saudi Arabia; Sudan; South Yemen; UAE
- Engagements: Lebanese Civil War

Commanders
- Notable commanders: (Lebanon) Major General Mohammed Hassan Ghoneim; (Lebanon) Colonel Ahmed Al-Hajj; (Lebanon) Major General Sami Al-Khatib; (Sudan) Colonel Mahdi Osman; (Sudan) Colonel Al-Sir Daqq

The Arab Deterrent Force (ADF; Arabic: قوات الردع العربية) was an international peacekeeping force created by the Arab League in the extraordinary Riyadh Summit on 17–18 October 1976, attended only by heads of state from Egypt, Kuwait, Lebanon, Saudi Arabia, and Syria. It decided to transform the 'token' Arab Security Force into the Arab Deterrent Force. A week later, the conclusions of the Riyadh Summit were endorsed and implemented by the Arab League's Cairo summit on 25–26 October 1976.

As the Lebanese Civil War escalated in 1976, the Arab League created an intervention force composed almost entirely of forces of Ba'athist Syria with token contributions from other Arab states, including Sudan, Saudi Arabia and Libya. Although nominally present at the behest of the government of Lebanon, the force was under the direct command of Syria. The ADF initially consisted of more than 35,000 troops of which 30,000 were provided by Syria. On 15 November, the ADF with Syrian forces occupied Beirut enforcing a truce effectively ending the civil war which had lasted 19 months at that point despite the occupation force consisting mostly of the Syrian Army. In late 1978, after the Arab League had extended the mandate of the Arab Deterrent Force, the Sudanese, the Saudis and the United Arab Emirates announced intentions to withdraw troops from Lebanon, extending their stay into the early months of 1979 at the Lebanese governments request. The Libyan troops were essentially abandoned and had to find their own way home (if at all), and the ADF thereby became a purely Syrian force (which did include the Palestinian Liberation Army (PLA)).

The ADF mandate was to deter the conflicting sides from resorting to conflict again, including the tasks of maintaining cease-fire, collecting heavy weapons and supporting the Lebanese government in maintaining its authority.

Robert Fisk wrote:

[...] Since the summer of 1976, the Syrians had controlled the Bekaa Valley. The headquarters of their 'Arab Deterrent Force' was at the Bekaa market town of Chtaura and their troops were billetted all the way up the valley, around the Greek Orthodox town of Zahle - where Cody and I had seen the Syrians and Phalangists cooperating in 1976 - at the airbase at Rayak, in Baalbek, and Hermel.

At 4:30 AM Monday November 15, 1976 The Arab Deterrent Forces consisting of 5,000 Sudanese, Saudi and Emirati Soldiers and 25,000 Syrian Soldiers deployed in and around Beirut in an attempt to cease hostilities between the Kataeb/Phalangist Lebanese government and the Palestine Liberation Organization. The Syrian peacekeepers began distributing weapons and support to pro-Syrian factions within both parties in Beirut at the time which lead to accusations that Syria was acting more as an occupying force and less as a peace-keeping force. On July 21, 1977, The Lebanese and Palestinian factions agreed on a compromise that would see the withdrawal of all PLO soldiers inside a 15 kilometer zone just off the Israeli Border and the Lebanese government would work in conjunction with the Arab Deterrent Force to ensure security of Lebanon. on July 30, 1977, Syrian soldiers were deployed in The Beqaa Valley and near Tripoli. June 1983 would seem the fracturing of the compromise between the Lebanese Government, the Arab Deterrent Forces and the Syrian Peacekeepers especially after the 1982 Israeli Invasion of Lebanon.

In 1981, the Syrian forces fought the Battle of Zahleh. R.D. Mclaurin wrote '..At the height of the battle, several Syrian Army units, totalling about 20,000 troops, were within an area 10–20 km around Zahleh.' These units included the 35th and 41st Brigades (Special Forces), 47th and 62nd Brigade (Mechanised Infantry), 51st Brigade (Ind. Armoured), and 67th Brigade, of which the last was along the border with Syria, southwest of Medina Sinaia.

A year after Israel invaded and occupied Southern Lebanon during the 1982 Lebanon War, the Lebanese government failed to extend the ADF's mandate, thereby effectively ending its existence, although not the Syrian or Israeli military presence in Lebanon. Eventually the Syrian presence became known as the Syrian occupation of Lebanon.

== History ==
The Arab Security Force, led by Major General Muhammad Hassan Ghunaim, had been deployed in a neutral zone between East and West Beirut beginning on Wednesday, July 21, 1976. However, this small force, which later formed the nucleus of the Arab Deterrent Force, was unable to halt the ongoing fighting in the region. This led to the convening of a six-party Arab summit in the Saudi capital, Riyadh, attended by representatives from Lebanon (where President Elias Sarkis had assumed office, succeeding Suleiman Franjieh), Saudi Arabia, Kuwait, Syria, Egypt, and the Palestine Liberation Organization. The summit statement read as follows:

- Strengthening the Arab Security Forces to become an Arab Deterrent Force operating inside Lebanon under the personal command of the President of the Lebanese Republic, with a strength of approximately 30,000 troops. Its tasks will be as follows:
  - Enforcing compliance with the ceasefire and deterring violators.
  - Maintaining internal security.
  - Supervising the withdrawal of armed personnel from their positions prior to April 13, 1975.
  - Implementing the Cairo Agreement.
  - Supervising the collection of heavy weapons.
  - Assisting the Lebanese authorities, when necessary, in managing public facilities and institutions.
- Declaring a ceasefire and ending fighting between all parties throughout Lebanon, effective at 6:00 a.m. on October 21, 1976.
- Establishing Arab Deterrent Force checkpoints after establishing buffer zones in areas of tension.
- Withdrawing armed personnel, collecting heavy weapons, and ending all armed manifestations according to a specific timetable.
- Implementing the Cairo Agreement and its annexes, particularly with regard to the presence of weapons and ammunition inside the camps, the withdrawal of Palestinian armed forces that entered after the outbreak of hostilities, and a pledge by the Palestine Liberation Organization not to interfere in the internal affairs of any Arab state.
- Later, on October 25, an Arab summit was held in Cairo and adopted the Riyadh summit decisions.

=== Formation ===
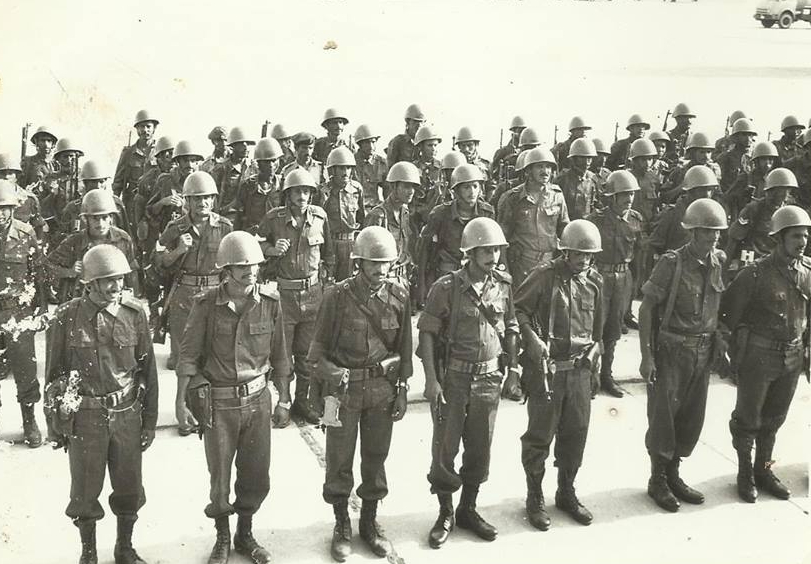
South Yemeni troops in Lebanon

The formation of the Arab Deterrent Force received significant attention, given the Palestine Liberation Organization's desire to include troops from various Arab countries, especially Egypt, in the peacekeeping force to prevent Syrian monopoly. However, Sadat chose not to participate, and the Syrian forces that entered Lebanon were the largest, totaling approximately 27,000 troops, compared to 3,000 troops from other Arab countries.

On November 1, 1976, President Elias Sarkis appointed Colonel Ahmed al-Hajj (an officer loyal to Fouad Chehab) as head of the Arab Deterrent Force.

=== Deployment ===
Troops began deploying, and clashes erupted between Syrian forces within the Arab Deterrent Force and Christian parties and militias while the former were stationed in the eastern regions. Emirati forces were deployed in the western Bekaa Valley, Saudi forces in Shiyyah and the area surrounding the airport, before moving to Dora and Karantina. Yemeni forces were stationed in Hadath and Al-Kafaat, and Sudanese forces in Ain al-Rummaneh-Shiyyah.

=== Discord and lack of coordination ===
Tensions quickly arose between Colonel Ahmad al-Hajj and Syrian officers over overlapping roles and poor coordination, leading al-Hajj to resign from his position. Although he had been named Director-General of the Internal Security Forces, President Sarkis and Syrian military leaders decided to appoint Lieutenant Colonel Sami al-Khatib in his place. Al-Khatib had sought refuge in Syria in 1970 after fleeing the Second Bureau, living there as a political exile.

During this period, frequent clashes broke out between Syrian troops and the Lebanese Forces under Bashir Gemayel, who led a near-war campaign to free Christian-dominated regions from Syrian occupation. Some Lebanese army officers secretly backed Gemayel’s strategy, fueling rising hostilities that soon erupted into direct confrontations between the Lebanese military and Syrian forces. One of the most significant incidents occurred on February 21, 1978, at the Shukri Ghanem barracks in Fayadieh. Syrian troops established a checkpoint outside the barracks that morning, causing alarm among Lebanese personnel. When negotiations to dismantle the checkpoint collapsed, Lebanese army units, commanded by Captain Samir al-Ashqar, fired on the Syrians, killing thirteen and injuring thirty-six. In retaliation, Syrian forces launched an artillery barrage on the barracks, resulting in the death of one officer and injuries to three soldiers.

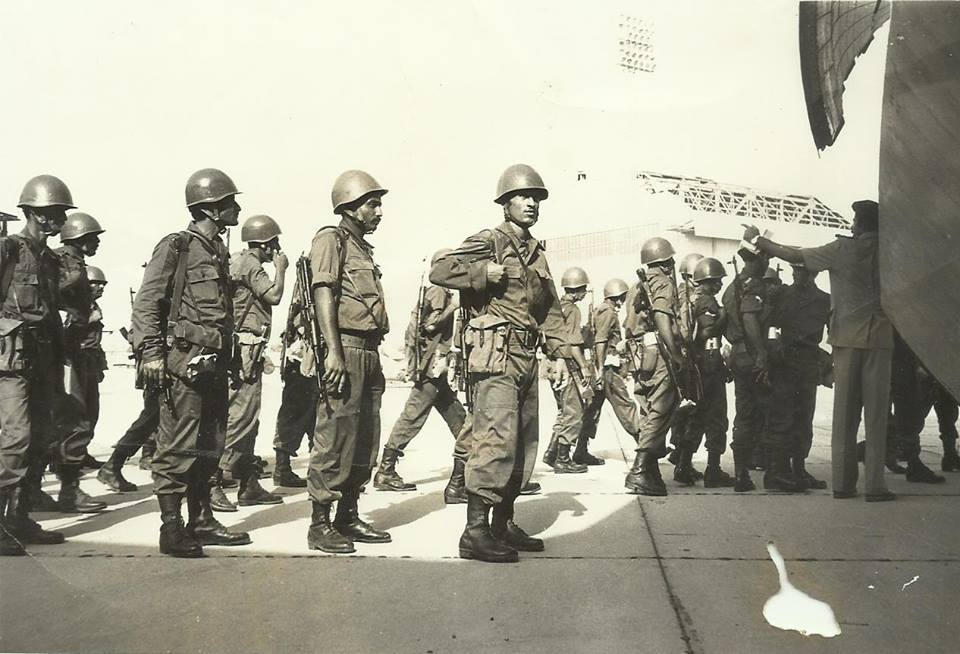
South Yemeni peacekeepers withdraw from Lebanon, 1982

The growing tensions between Syrian and Lebanese forces, along with the warming relations between Syria and the Palestinians, hastened the withdrawal of Arab units from Lebanon. Many leaders and soldiers within these forces felt they were little more than symbolic additions to the Arab Deterrent Force, further motivating their departure. Saudi Arabia was the first to pull out, followed by Yemen, Sudan, and the United Arab Emirates. By late May 1979, Syria stood alone as the sole remaining force, effectively transforming the ADF into a Syrian-led operation—though it still operated under the nominal authority of Lebanon’s president.

In reality, all major decisions were directed from Damascus. This arrangement persisted until 1982, when Syrian troops withdrew from Lebanon in the wake of Israel’s invasion, marking the formal end of the Arab Deterrent Force’s mission.

== See also ==
- Arab League monitors in Syria

== Notes ==
- Telegram from the Department of State to the Embassy in Syria, March 1978 (document 237)
