= Beddawi refugee camp =

Human settlement in Lebanon

Coordinates: 34°27′0.64″N 35°52′9.17″E

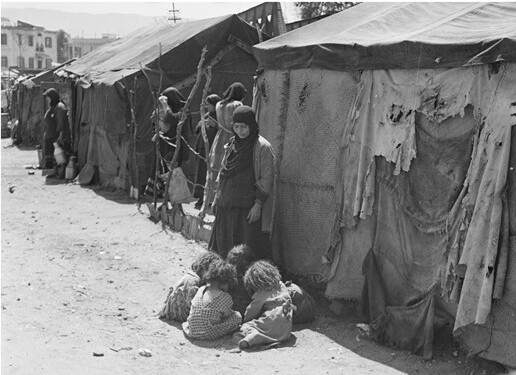
Photograph of the camp showing the makeshift housing of some of the residents

The Beddawi refugee camp (Arabic: مخيم البداوي, romanized: Mukhayyam al-Badāwī) is a refugee camp in north Lebanon. Established in 1955, it is located near Beddawi in the high region which is in front of Tripoli city. The site, which is leased to UNRWA by the Lebanese state, is about 1 square kilometre (0.39 sq mi) in total. The camp's borders have not expanded over time, but its population has, and so it has grown vertically to accommodate increasing numbers of refugees.

== History ==
The camp was damaged during the Lebanese civil war. A number of refugees came to the Beddawi camp after Israel destroyed the Nabatieh refugee camp in 1974 and from the Tel al-Zaatar refugee camp after the Tel al-Zaatar massacrein 1976. Throughout the 1970s–1990s, bomb shelters were built in schools in the camp. These shelters were later destroyed and repurposed as foundations.

Even more refugees came to the camp in 2007 after the Nahr al-Bared refugee camp was destroyed. These newcomers lived in cramped quarters in schoolhouse, with as many as 50 people living in a single room.

The camp was bombed by Israel in 2024, during the Gaza war.

== Sectors ==
The camp is divided into four sectors: A, B, C, and D.

Sector A contains 30% of the occupants. Most of them are from Safad region, Shafaamer, Nahf, Safouri, Yafa, Yafa Badoun, Al-Ghabisiyya, or Al-Safsf.

Sector B contains 20% of the occupants. Most of them are from Safad region, Al-Safsf, Sohmata, Al- Brwih, Hayfa, Al-Bozih, Jahoula, or Al-Naami.

Sector C contains 30% of the occupants. Most of them are from Safad region, Al-Bozih, Safouri, Hayfa region, Yafa, or Khalesah.

Sector D contains 20%, distributed among 3 regions:

- PLO region: they are living in temporary houses and the occupants of these houses are displaced from Tel El- Zaater camp and south of Lebanon (Muhajarine).
- School region: they are from the same PLO region but the UNRWA has built new houses for them instead of temporary houses.
- Abo Naem buildings: they are living here for a temporary period because these buildings have an owner.
