= Hundred Days' War =

1978 conflict within the Lebanese Civil War

Hundred Days War
- Part of the Syrian intervention in the Lebanese Civil War
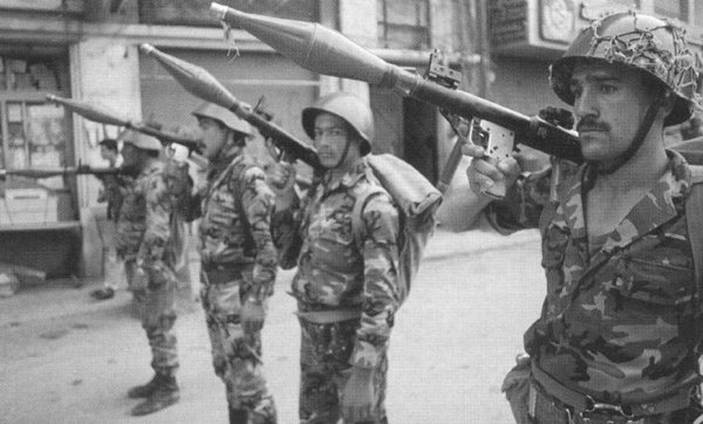
- Syrian Arab Army soldiers equipped with RPG-7s in Beirut, 1978.
Date	July 1 – October 8, 1978 (100 days)
Location	East Beirut, Lebanon
Result	Lebanese Front victory: Syrian withdrawal from East Beirut; The Arab Deterrent Force replaces the Syrian forces in East Beirut

Belligerents
Lebanese Front; Kataeb Party; Kataeb Regulatory Forces; National Liberal Party; Tigers Militia; Al-Tanzim; Guardians of the Cedars; Lebanese Youth Movement; Tyous Team of Commandos; Army of Free Lebanon	Syria; Syrian Arab Army; Defense Companies; Supported by: Marada Brigade; Arab Deterrent Force

Commanders and leaders
Pierre Gemayel; Bachir Gemayel; Camille Chamoun; Dany Chamoun; Obad Zouein; Fawzi Mahfouz; Etienne Saqr; Bachir el-Khoury; Joseph Hanna; Saad Haddad; Antoine Barakat	(Syria) Hafez al-Assad (Syria) Mustafa Tlass (Syria) Hikmat al-Shihabi

Casualties and losses
- 200 dead and 400 injured

The Hundred Days War (Arabic: حرب المئة يوم, Harb Al-Mia'at Yaoum, French: La Guerre des Cent Jours) was a subconflict within the 1977–82 phase of the Lebanese Civil War which occurred in the Lebanese capital Beirut. It was fought between the allied Christian Lebanese Front militias, under the command of the Kataeb Party's President Bachir Gemayel, and the Syrian troops of the Arab Deterrent Force (ADF).

== Background ==
In January 1976, the Phalange joined the main Christian parties – National Liberal Party (NLP), Lebanese Renewal Party (LRP), Marada Brigade, Al-Tanzim, and others – in a loose coalition, the Lebanese Front, designed to act as a political counterweight to the predominantly Muslim Lebanese National Movement (LNM) – Palestine Liberation Organization (PLO) alliance. In order to deal with the Syrian military intervention of June 1976 and better coordinate the military operations of their respective militias, Christian militia leaders agreed to form in August that year a joint military command (a.k.a. the "Command Council") whose new collective name was the "Lebanese Forces" (LF). From the very beginning, it became clear that the Lebanese Front's Command Council was dominated by the Phalange and its KRF militia under the charismatic leadership of Bachir Gemayel, who sought to unify the various Christian militias. From 1977 onwards, Bachir began implementing the controversial "unification of the rifle" policy, using the LF to build a new power base for himself, distinct from that of the Phalange or any of the other traditional rightist parties. However, Bachir's actions soon put him on a direct collision course with Syria. Relations between the LF command and Damascus had already become frosty as a consequence of the ADF's growing unwillingness to either suppress the LNM-PLO alliance militias in west Beirut altogether or allow the Christian militias to do so.

== History ==
=== 1 July 1978 ===
On this day, Syrian army started a military offensive destined to dislodge the anti-Syrian Lebanese Front leadership from Beirut and the Front's strongholds. This move not only began the Lebanese Hundred's Days War but a series of confrontation between Lebanese nationalists and Syrian regime and pro-Syrian factions, that continue to this day.

In this opening act, Syria gathered 15,000 troops around Beirut supported by heavy weaponry, which bombed Lebanese residential areas in the city at a heavy rate reaching sometimes 100 shells per minute. On the other hand, the Lebanese Front united its leadership under Bachir Gemayel and started successive counter operations against Syrian brigades, which Syria responded with further savage bombings determined to seize control of Lebanon at all costs.

The final stage of the war culminated with the humiliating surrender of brigades of Syrian special forces in Beirut after only days of encirclement. This event caused a massive collapse in Syrian morale and its leadership started to question the ability of the army to take Lebanon.

Following this, the USSR rushed to defend Syria by calling a meeting to UN security council on 7th October 1978. The meeting lasted for only 4 minutes and issued resolution 436, forcing an end to the fightings, an end to Syrian so called "de-zionification" operation and recognising the legitimacy of the Lebanese Front as representative of Lebanese Free Zones on international stages.

== Consequences ==
However, the LF attack on the pro-Syrian Marada Brigade militia of the Frangieh Clan that summer, which culminated in the infamous Ehden massacre, provoked another round of fighting in June–July. President Elias Sarkis threatened to resign in protest over the Syrian bombardment of East Beirut, but later withdrew his resignation when the shelling stopped. More fighting erupted in the fall, again followed by a ceasefire. In October 1978, the Foreign Ministers of Lebanon and those Arab League states contributing to the ADF – Syria, Saudi Arabia, Kuwait, Sudan, Qatar and the UAE – met at the town of Beiteddine, in the Chouf District south-east of Beirut. The outcome of the meeting was essentially a reaffirmation of the role of the ADF and a strong condemnation of those dealing with Israel. This meeting, and subsequent discussions between Syria and Saudi Arabia led to the lifting of the siege of Achrafieh by the Syrians and the withdrawal of all Syrian troops from East Beirut, being replaced by Saudi and Sudanese ADF troops, whom the Lebanese Front leaders viewed as more impartial and less hostile towards the Christians than the Syrian forces. The settlement was welcomed by the Lebanese Front parties and marked the end of the clashes.

== See also ==
- Army of Free Lebanon
- Battle of the Hotels
- Lebanese Civil War
- Lebanese Forces
- Lebanese Front
- List of weapons of the Lebanese Civil War

== Bibliography ==
- Edgar O'Ballance, Civil War in Lebanon, 1975–92, Palgrave Macmillan, London 1998. ISBN 0333729757
- Itamar Rabinovich, The war for Lebanon, 1970–1985, Cornell University Press, Ithaca and London 1989 (revised edition). ISBN 978-0801493133
- Joseph Hokayem, L'armée libanaise pendant la guerre: un instrument du pouvoir du président de la République (1975–1985), Lulu.com, Beyrouth 2012. ISBN 978-1291036602, (in French) – L'armée libanaise pendant la guerre: un instrument du pouvoir du président de la République (1975–1985)
- Jonathan Randall, Going All the Way: Christian Warlords, Israeli Adventurers and the War in Lebanon, Just World Books 2012. ISBN 978-1935982166
- Moustafa El-Assad, Civil Wars Volume 1: The Gun Trucks, Blue Steel books, Sidon 2008. ISBN 9953-0-1256-8
- Rex Brynen, Sanctuary and Survival: the PLO in Lebanon, Boulder: Westview Press, Oxford 1990. ISBN 0861871235 – Sanctuary and Survival: The PLO in Lebanon
- Paul Jureidini, R. D. McLaurin, and James Price, Military operations in selected Lebanese built-up areas, 1975–1978, Aberdeen, MD: U.S. Army Human Engineering Laboratory, Aberdeen Proving Ground, Technical Memorandum 11-79, June 1979.
- Samer Kassis, 30 Years of Military Vehicles in Lebanon, Beirut: Elite Group, 2003. ISBN 9953007055
- Samer Kassis, Véhicules Militaires au Liban/Military Vehicles in Lebanon 1975–1981, Trebia Publishing, Chyah 2012. ISBN 978-9953023724
