= Ain El Remmaneh =

Neighborhood in Lebanon

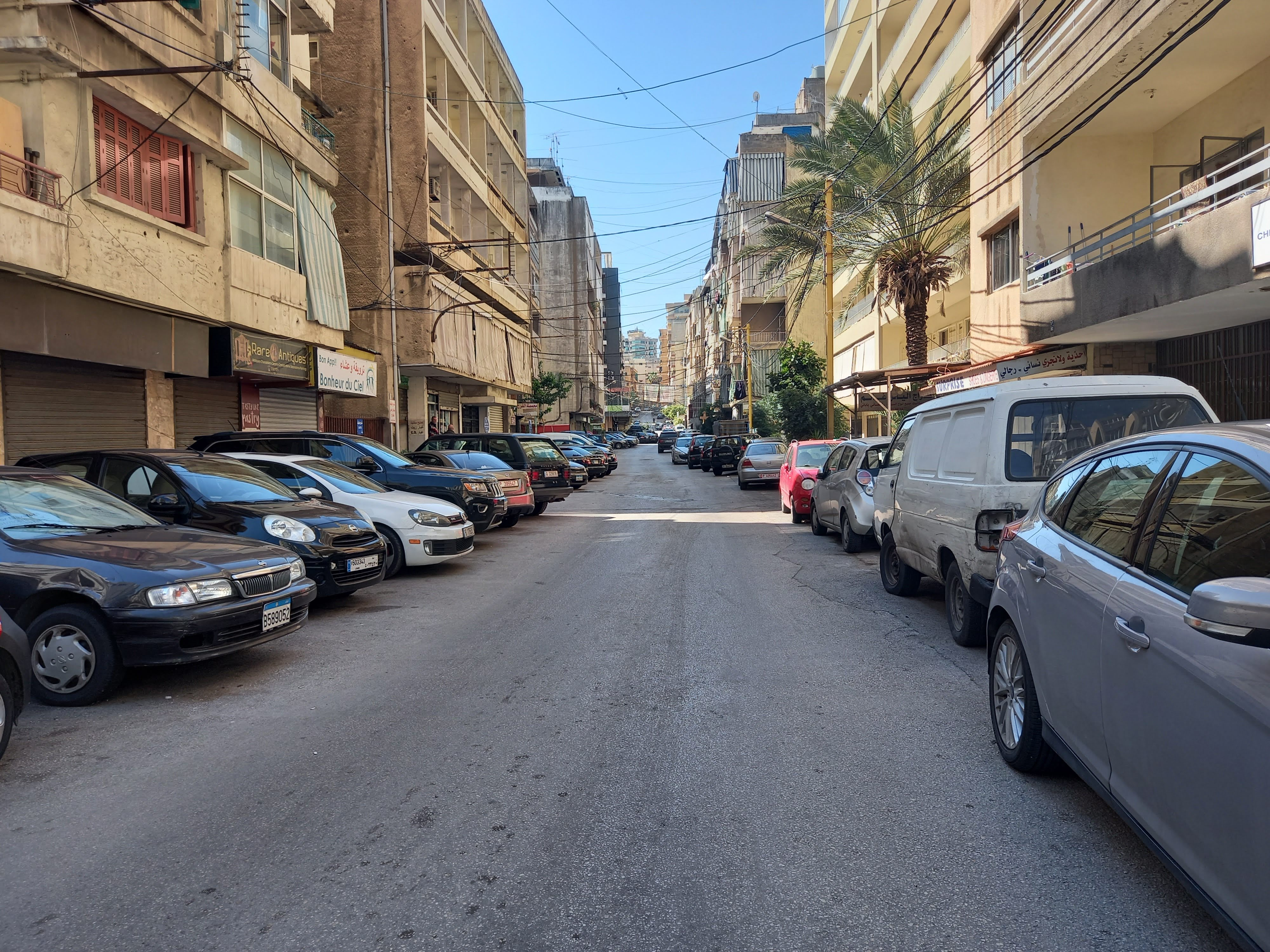
A street in Ain el Remmaneh, 2021.

Ain El Remmaneh (Arabic: عين الرمانة, lit. spring of the pomegranate) is a Christian neighborhood, in the Baabda district of Mount Lebanon, Lebanon, part of furn El chebek city in the east suburb of Beirut and part of Greater Beirut.

== History and war ==
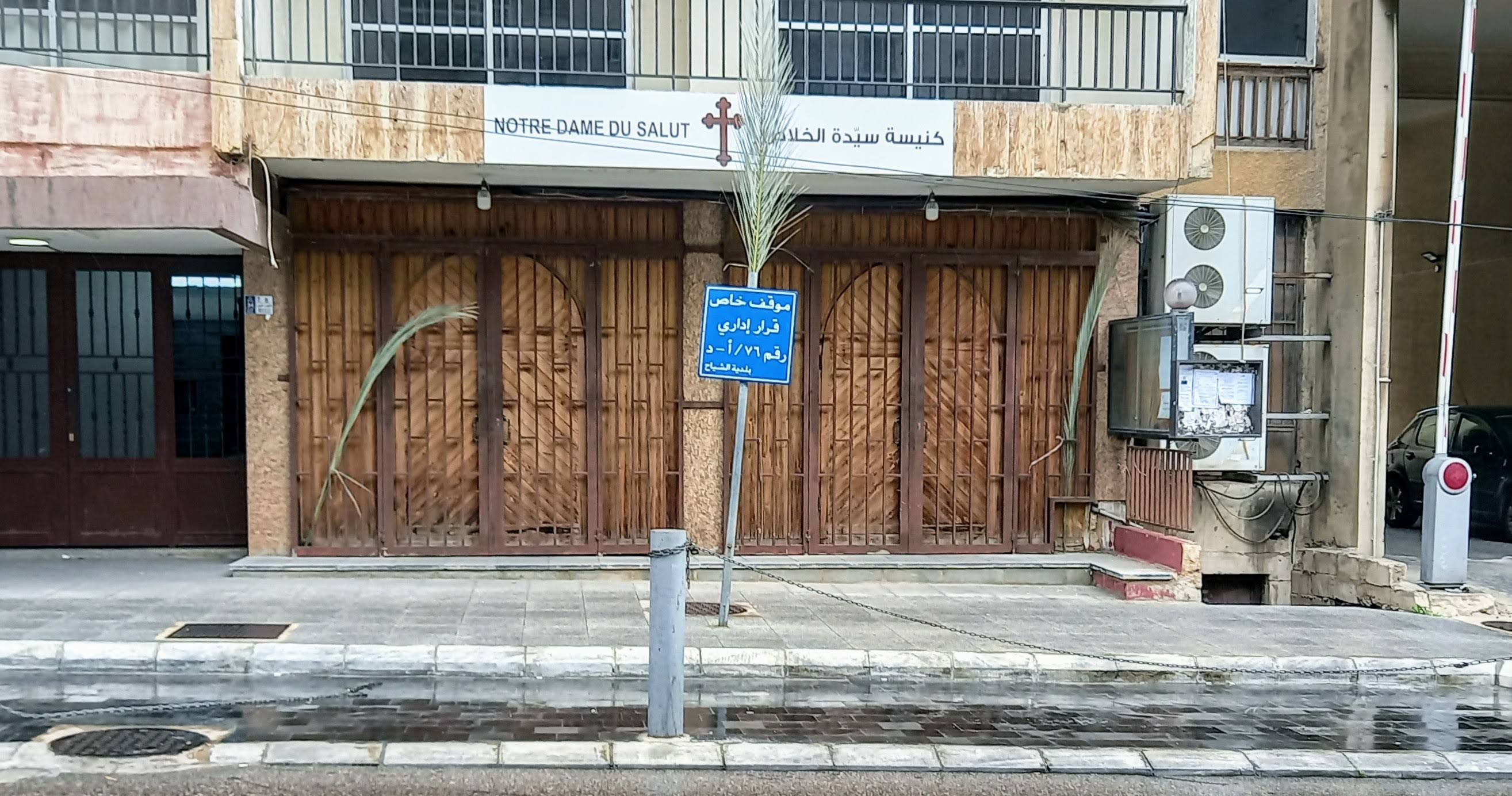
Notre Dame du Salut Church (كنيسة سيدة الخلاص), where the assassination attempt of Pierre Gemayel took place.

In the 1950s, the populous town was known for gathering intellectuals and prominent personalities like the poet Said Akl.

On April 13, 1975, it witnessed the serious church shooting and Bus Massacre, between the local Christian Kataeb party and the Arab Liberation Front militants and Palestinians, which sparked the 15-year-long civil war.

During the Civil War, it became a war-torn neighbourhood and an important stronghold of the Christian militias, like the Lebanese Forces, Kataeb, Ahrar, Herras, etc., and witnessed violent battles, either with the Muslims across the Green Line with Chyah of the "West Beirut" on its border, the Syrian Forces, Palestinians and even inter-Christian conflicts, and was known for its endurance, thus became known as the "fortress of resistance" (قلعة الصمود).

In February 1990 General Aoun launched an unsuccessful campaign to dislodge Samir Geagea’s Lebanese Forces (LF) from East Beirut. Ain El Remmaneh became the scene of intense fighting and artillery exchanges which caused extensive damage and many casualties. The district fell to Aoun’s soldiers on 15-16 February with LF fighters escaping by way of Syrian controlled West Beirut.

=== Bus massacre ===
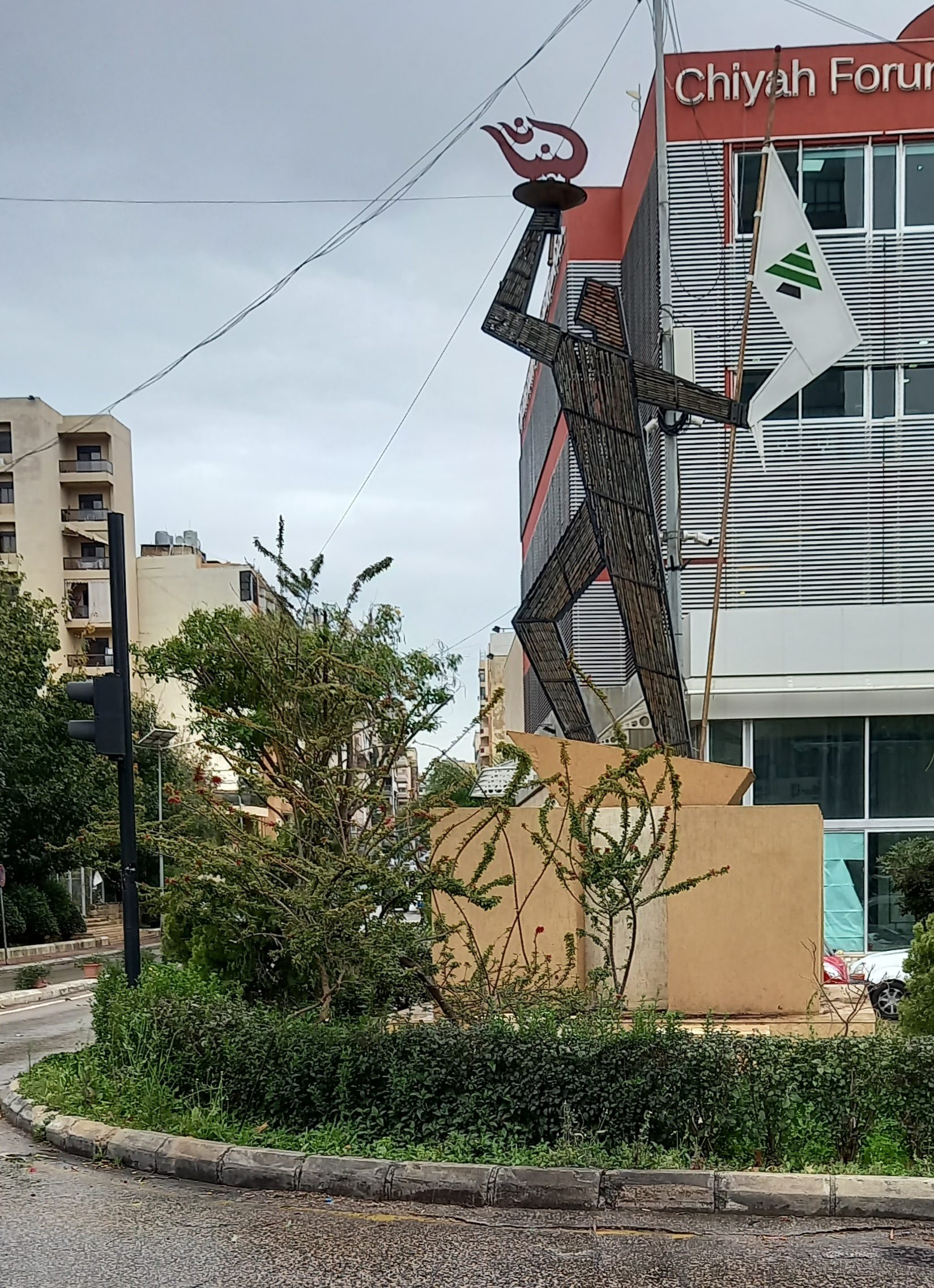
The Bullet Statue تمثال الرصاص made out of bullets.

On April 13, 1975, a bus passing through Ain Al-Remmaneh, transporting Arab Liberation Front guerilla fighters and Palestinians returning from a festival, heading to their camp in Tel al-Zaatar, was gunned down by militiamen of the Kataeb party, killing all the 27 passengers except the driver, which marked the start of the Lebanese Civil War. The incident happened just hours after 4 Christians were killed outside a nearby church during a child's baptism in Ain El-Remmaneh in an assassination attempt of the Phalangist (Kataeb) leader Pierre Gemayel.

== Etymology ==
Ain El Remmaneh means "the water spring of the pomegranate tree", for the area was known to be covered with pomegranate and citrus trees before it was wiped out during the civil war.

== Overview ==
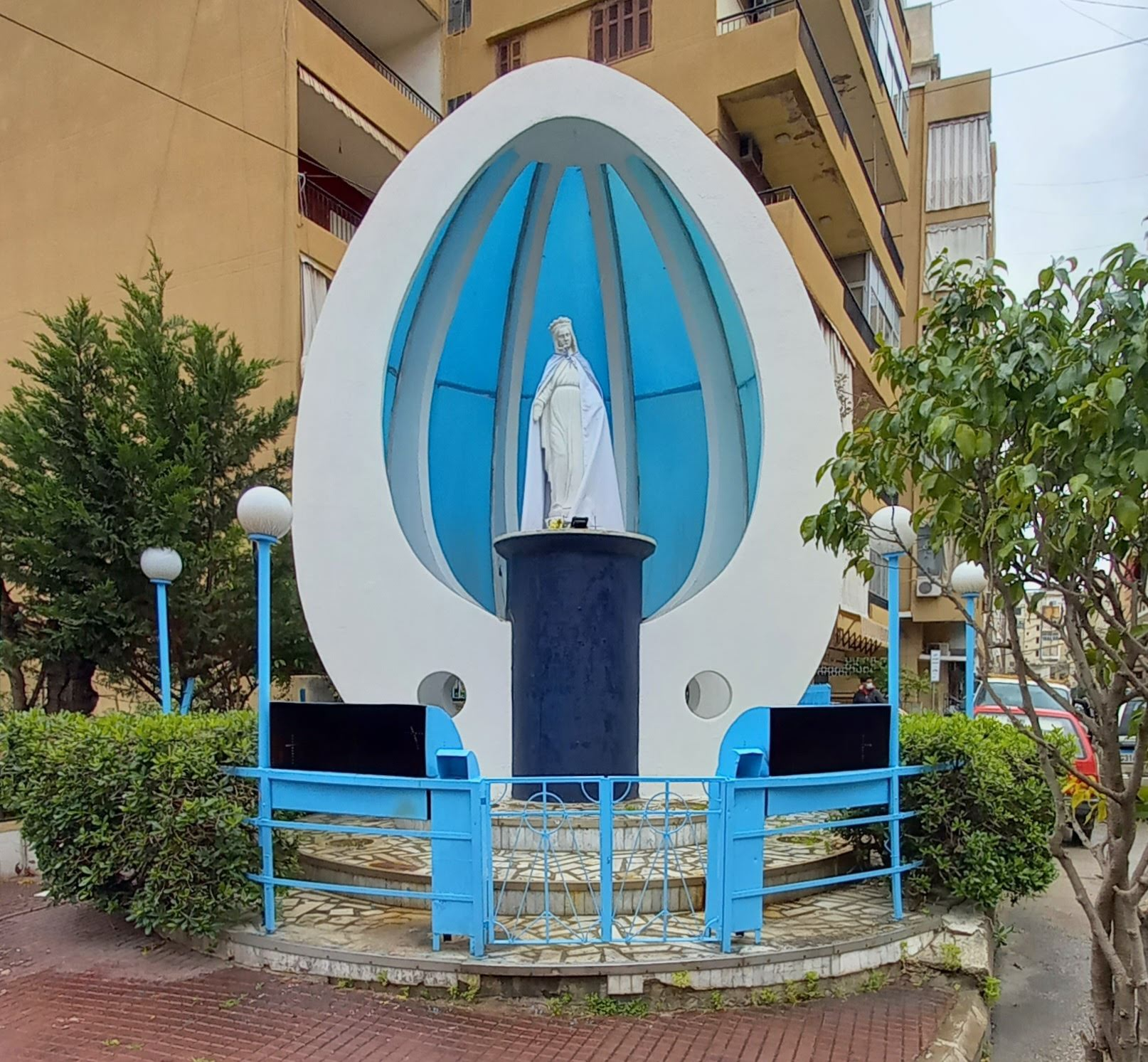
The famous Virgin Mary Statue تمثال المرايا

Ain El Remmaneh is managed by the municipality of Furn Al Chebbak, which also manages Tahwitet El Nahr (tahwita). It is surrounded by Sin El Fil from the north, Chiyah from the South, Hazmieh from the East and Beirut from the West. Its strategic location has transformed it into an important urban area, with industrial and educational significance.

== Notable residents ==
- Samir Geagea (born 1952), Lebanese leader and politician
- Said Akl: A Lebanese poet and writer known for his contributions to Arabic literature.
- Amin Maalouf: A Lebanese novelist and historian who won the Prix Goncourt in 1986 for his novel "The Crossing."
- Hoda Barakat: A Lebanese writer and translator.

== See also ==
- Achrafieh
- Dekwaneh
- Hazmieh
- Sin el Fil
