= Maronite League =

The Maronite League – ML (Arabic: الرابطة المارونية, Al-Rabitat al-Marouniyya) is a private, non-profit and apolitical organization of Lebanese Christian Maronite notables, dedicated mainly to defend the independence and sovereignty of Lebanon in the cadre of a democratic and pluralistic society. The President of the Maronite League is the highest civic Maronite authority in Lebanon after the President of the republic and is empowered to speak for the Maronite community of Lebanon. The Maronite League is also the political wing of Bkerké, the ecclesiastical patriarchal authority in Lebanon. The current President of the Maronite League is the former President of the Lebanese Bar Association, Lawyer Antoine Klimos, elected in March 2016 in Beirut.

== Composition ==
The League is often described as an exclusively Maronite "elitist group" whose membership was "automatic" for prominent figures in the public and private sector – Intellectuals, Businessmen, Bankers, Politicians (including former Heads of State, Members of Parliament, Government Ministers, and diplomats), Lawyers, Jurists, Public Servants, retired senior Army or Police officers, Presidents of Economic and Social Associations, Corporate Managers, and others. Only 60 new members are admitted each year. In reality, the League is a Phoenicianist-oriented lobby aimed at promoting Maronite Christian interests at the Lebanese Government and Parliament.

== Structure and organization ==
The Maronite League is run by a council of seventeen elected senior members, the executive board, which is headed by an elected president and vice-president assisted by a general-secretary and a treasurer chosen from elected members of the council. There is a General Assembly, formed by all members of the League, which elects in a single session the President and the vice-president, the executive board, and the Admission's Committee. The President and the vice-president are elected for three years and the term is renewable one time. The executive board is elected on a separate ballot by the General Assembly also for three years, which is renewable one time. There are also twelve Permanent Committees, each one headed by a member of the executive board; these Committees can be increased or decreased in number by the executive board as the need arises. The Admission's Committee is elected by the General Assembly for one year, although the term is not renewable. Board meetings are held at the League's Headquarters, in the Central Council of the Maronite Societies Building located at Rue Medawar in Beirut.

== Financing ==
Being a non-profit organization, its primary source of funding comes from annual membership fees paid by its affiliates as well as private donations.

== List of ML presidents (1952-present) ==
- Georges Tabet
- HE Dr.Elias Khoury
- Jean Abou Jaoudeh
- Chaker Abou Sleiman
- Ernest Karam
- HE Pierre Helou
- HE Michel Eddé
- Emir Hares Chehab
- Dr.Joseph Torbey
- Emir Samir Abillama
- H.E. Antoine Klimos

== Members of the executive council 2007-2013 ==
- Joseph Torbey (President)
- Abdallah Bou Habib (vice-president)
- Samir Hobeika (Secretary general)
- Abdo Geries (Treasurer)
- Emile Abi Nader
- Fadi Abboud
- Badoui Abou Dib
- Hikmat Abou Zeid
- Fouad Aoun
- François Bassil
- Alia Berty Zein
- Antoine Boustany
- Antoine Wakim
- Charles El-Haj
- Georges Hayek
- Chawki Kazan
- Antonio Andari

== Members of the executive council 2013-2016 ==
- Samir Abillama (President)
- Maurice Khawam (vice-president)
- Fares Abi Nasr (Secretary general)
- Michel Comaty (Treasurer)
- Nada Abdel Sater
- Emile Abi Nader
- Laurent Aoun
- Carla Chehab
- Antoine Costantine
- Fadi Geries
- Ibrahim Jabbour
- Walid Joseph Khoury
- Bechara Karkafi
- Souheil Matar
- Maroun Romanos
- Maroun Serhal
- Jihad Torbey

== Members of the executive council 2016-2019 ==
- Antoine Klimos (President)
- Toufic Moawad (vice-president)
- Antoine Wakim (Secretary general)
- Abdo Geryes (Treasurer)
- Antoine Khoury
- Maroun Serhal
- Joseph Kreyker
- Souheil Matar
- Antoine Costantine
- Charbel Estéphan
- Alia Berty Zein
- Tina Ghazal Mallah
- Carla Milan Chehab
- Nada Andraos Aziz
- Joseph Nehmé
- Walid Khoury
- Georges Hajj

== History ==
First established on August 21, 1952, in Beirut by a group of Christian notables and intellectuals with Georges Tabet being elected as president in their first General Assembly, the Maronite League became more politicised towards the 1960s, strengthening its ties with Maronite Church leaders. Politically conservative and anti-communist, being hostile towards Pan-Arabism and opposed to secularization, the group since the 1950s maneuvered to neutralize any measures that might threat the Christian-dominated political status quo, quietly exerting pressure on the authorities to lift legal bans on Maronite Church public activities or to restrict labor rights by curbing the Trade Unions. They also objected the presence of Palestinian refugees and the Palestine Liberation Organization (PLO) guerrilla factions, advocating their total eviction from Lebanon.

=== The Maronite League in the Lebanese Civil War 1975-1990 ===
Under the presidency of Chaker Abou Sleiman, an ardent supporter of Father Charbel Qassis of the Order of Maronite Monks, the League in the early 1970s provided secret financial support and political cadres to the Christian militias, notably the Al-Tanzim led by the physician Dr. Fuad Chemali since 1972 (who, besides being the president of the Medical Association, was also a member of the executive board of the Maronite League and later a founding member of the Lebanese Front). In 1975 Abou Sleiman even used the League's funds to raise a 200 men-strong militia, which he led personally and saw heavy action in Beirut during the 1975-76 civil war, defending the Christian quarters against Lebanese National Movement (LNM)/PLO Joint Forces' attacks. The League joined the Lebanese Front in 1976 and, despite having their own militia absorbed into the Lebanese Forces in the following year they managed to maintain themselves as a separate body. Remaining active – mostly behind the scenes – throughout the civil war, the League encouraged a rapprochement policy and reconciliation between the different Christian parties and militias during the violent inter-Christian strifes of the late 1970s and late 1980s.

=== The post-war years ===
Eventually, the ML emerged unscathed in the post-war years as a powerful pressure group with some 1,000-1,200 current members, which continues to promote Christian interests in Lebanon and abroad. Its current President is Antoine Klimos, former President of the Beirut Bar Association.

== See also ==
- Al-Tanzim
- Lebanese Civil War
- Lebanese Front
- Lebanese Forces (militia)
- Phoenicianism
- 1958 Lebanon crisis
