= 1978 Arab League summit =

Meeting of Arab regional organization

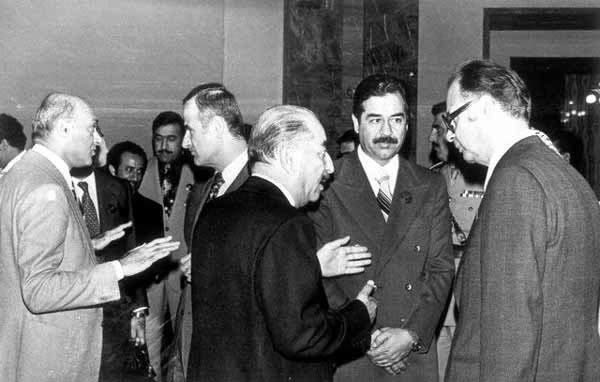
- Host country: Iraq
- Date: 2–5 November 1978
- Cities: Baghdad
- Follows: 1976 Arab League summit

The 1978 Arab League summit was meeting held between Arab leaders between 2–5 November in Baghdad as the 9th Arab League Summit. The summit came in the aftermath of Egypt's Anwar Sadat's unilateral peace treaty with Israel. On 31 March 1979, five days after the ratification of the Egypt-Israel Peace Treaty, Arab leaders again convened in Baghdad in the absence of Egypt and decided to expel it from the Arab League. Consequently, the secretariat of the League was moved out of its Cairo headquarters to Tunis. This decision was slowly reversed in the 1980s after president Hosni Mubarak ascended to power. Egypt, which regained strong influence in the region as rival nation Syria was suffering setbacks during the Lebanon Civil War, returned to the Arab League on 23 May 1989 and the headquarters, which never saw completed construction in Tunis, return to Cairo on 12 March 1990.
