= Beddawi =

Town in Miniyeh-Danniyeh District, Lebanon

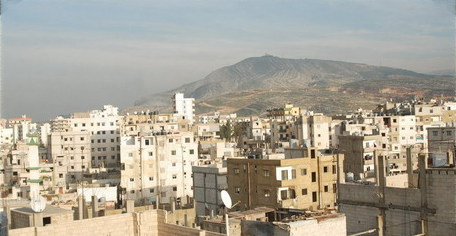

Beddawi (Arabic: البداوي, romanized: al-Beddāwī), also spelled Beddaoui, is a town situated at the Mediterranean Sea about 5 km north of the center of Tripoli, Lebanon. It is part of Tripoli's metro area and a mainly Sunni Muslim Lebanese village. It had 6,012 eligible voters in the 2009 election. There are 4 primary schools and one secondary school and one soccer team. The city is surrounded by orange orchards and has two buildings of the crusades.

It has also a non-working petroleum refinery, out of order since the Lebanese Civil War. Beddawi city should not be confused with the Beddawi Palestinian camp. Until today, Beddawi remains the main connection between the northernmost coast and the rest of Lebanon since the main coastal highway goes through the town. However, a couple of years ago, a separate highway closer to the coast started being constructed.

== History ==
Until the 1950s Beddawi was a little village surrounded by fields and had less than a 1,000 inhabitants. In 1955 the Palestinian refugees built a camp near the city and named it Beddawi camp. In 1983 the city underwent several battles between the Palestinian Militias and parts of it were severely damaged.

== Demographics ==
In 2014, Muslims made up 99.62% of registered voters in Beddawi. 98.87% of the voters were Sunni Muslims.
