= 1976 Arab League summit (Riyadh) =

Meeting of Arab regional organization

Arab League summit
- Host country: Saudi Arabia
- Date: October 16, 1976
- Cities: Riyadh

The 1976 Arab League summit was held on October 16 in Riyadh, Saudi Arabia, as an extraordinary Arab League Summit. The summit came in the aftermath of the escalating civil war in Lebanon. It was attended only by representatives from Saudi Arabia, Egypt, Syria, Kuwait, Lebanon and the Palestine Liberation Organization. The summit called for an end to the civil war and for the PLO to respect Lebanese sovereignty.

== See also ==
- 1976 Arab League summit (Cairo)
