= Tel al-Zaatar massacre =

1976 Christian militia attack on Palestinian refugee camp in Beirut

- Part of the Lebanese Civil War
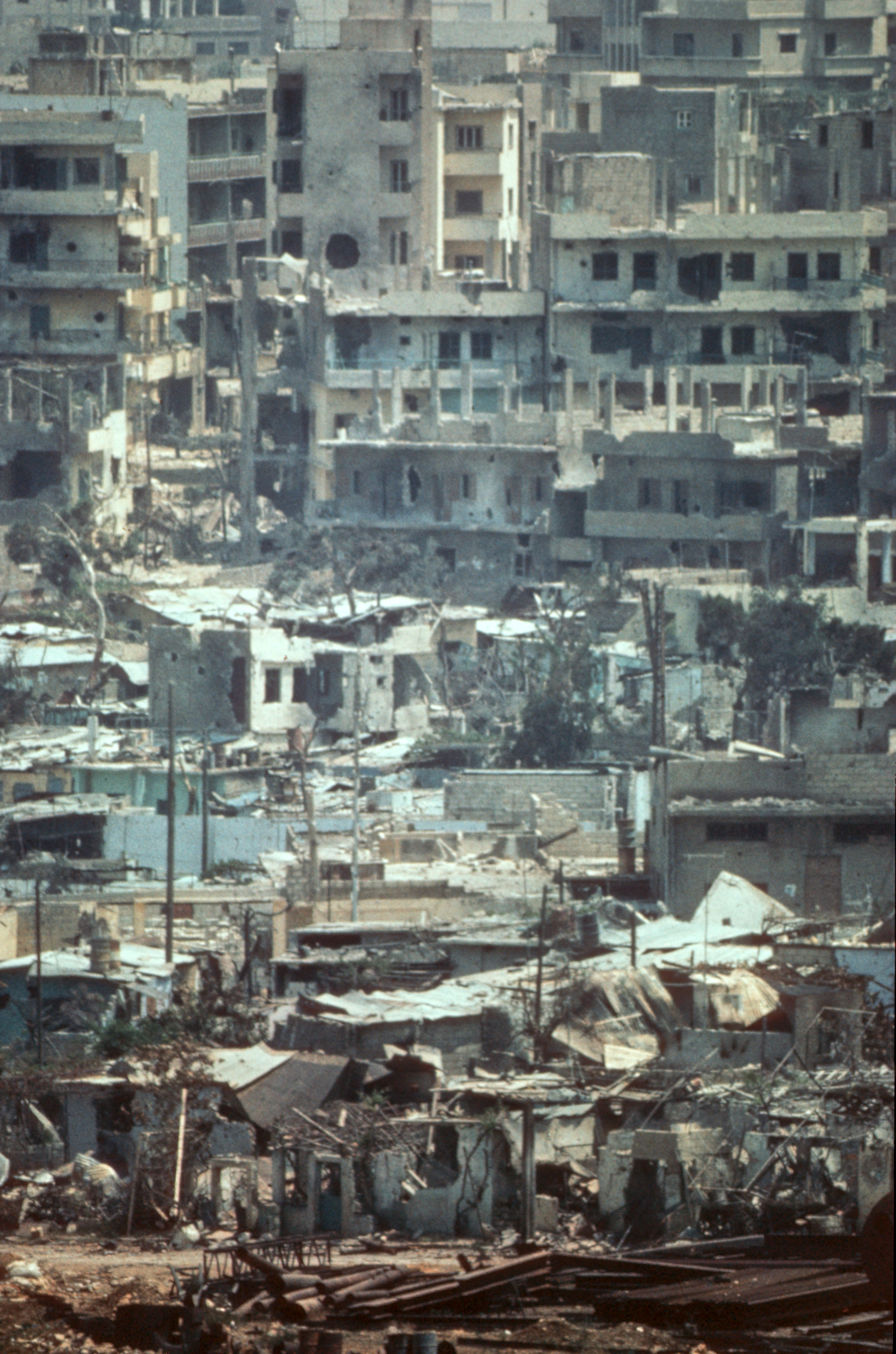
- The destroyed camp on 31 August 1976 (from the ICRC archives)
- Location: Tel al-Zaatar camp, Beirut, Lebanon
- Date: 12 August 1976
- Target: Palestinians, Lebanese Muslims
- Attack type: Massacre
- Deaths: Unknown: 1,500 estimated killed in the massacre on Aug 12th; 2,000–3,000 Palestinians estimated killed overall in the siege and massacre
- Perpetrators: Lebanese Front: Kataeb Regulatory Forces; Tigers Militia; Guardians of the Cedars; Al-Tanzim; Lebanese Youth Movement (MKG)

The Tel al-Zaatar (Note: Arabic: تل الزعتر, meaning "Hill of Thyme". Also called Tal Zaatar. Transliterations vary with Tel also spelled as Tal and Zaatar also spelled Za'atar) massacre was the killing of approximately 1,500 Palestinians and Lebanese Muslims in the Tel al-Zaatar refugee camp in Beirut, Lebanon on 12 August 1976. The massacre occurred during the Lebanese Civil War, after the Tel al-Zaatar refugee camp had been under siege since January 1976 by Lebanese Christian militias of the Lebanese Front led by the Kataeb Phalangists. The attack on al-Zaatar was part of a wider campaign to expel Palestinians from Lebanon, especially those affiliated with the Palestine Liberation Organization (PLO). After the massacre, the Tel al-Zaatar refugee camp was depopulated and destroyed.

== Background ==
In 1976 Tel al-Zaatar refugee camp was home to more than 30,000 people; mostly Palestinians but also Lebanese. Initially established as a refugee camp to accommodate Palestinians displaced by the 1948 Palestinian expulsion and flight, the camp was administered by UNRWA from 1952 until the Cairo Agreement of 1969, which put the Palestinian Liberation Organization (PLO) in charge of the camp.

As the camp's population grew and its area expanded, it came into conflict with the neighbouring Dekwaneh suburb, which was predominantly Maronite Christian, and from 1969 to 1975 several armed clashed erupted between the two populations.

On April 13, 1975, a group of Lebanese Christian Phalangist militiamen ambushed a bus on its way to Tel al-Zaatar, massacring 27 people, mostly Palestinians. This attack led to the outbreak of the Lebanese Civil War.

Following a killing of five Phalangists in the Christian controlled area of Fanar on December 6, 1975, Maronite local militia captured hundreds of Muslims in East Beirut at random and massacred 150 to 200 of them in what became known as Black Saturday. This led to more fighting between the rival factions. Tel al-Zaatar camp became a target of both the Phalangists and the NLP Tigers.

By 1976, Tel al-Zaatar was the only Palestinian enclave left in the Christian-dominated area of East Beirut. Christian militias such as the Kataeb Regulatory Forces and the Guardians of the Cedars began attacking Palestinian refugee camps shortly after the war began due to the PLO's support for Muslim and leftist factions. On January 18, they forcibly took control of the Karantina district and carried out the Karantina Massacre.

The Christian forces were initially leery of escalating PLO involvement in the war, but Karantina was inhabited partly by Lebanese Muslims and was located along the main road they needed to resupply their positions in Beirut, so it was considered a legitimate target. However, the PLO joined Muslim militias in retaliating for the Karantina Massacre by massacring the Christian population of Damour. Damour was a stronghold for the National Liberal Party (NLP), a Christian faction affiliated with Lebanese Front, which led to the Christian militias declaring war on the PLO by the end of January.

Tel al-Zaatar was immediately surrounded by 500 troops from the Kataeb Regulatory Forces, 500 from the NLP's armed wing (the Tigers Militia), and 400 others from various other militias, namely the Guardians of the Cedars. The militias were joined by about 300 members of the Lebanese security forces. They were equipped with Super Sherman tanks and a squadron of Panhard AML-90 armoured cars.

Starting on June 23, Maronite groups begin confronting the rival enclaves within Christian dominated territories. This was in order to disrupt the land and sea supplies of these enemies and was part of the attack against the Tel-El Zaatar camp. There were 1,500 armed PLO fighters inside the camp at the time. They were mostly affiliated with As-Sa'iqa and the Arab Liberation Front. There were also smaller groups of fighters from the Popular Front for the Liberation of Palestine and the Popular Front for the Liberation of Palestine – General Command. To complicate matters further, there were unaffiliated fighters present who fought under the PLO umbrella but did not support any one faction, mostly foreign fedayeen. Factionalism within the camp contributed greatly to the success of the siege, as most of the As-Sa'iqa militants and As-Sa'iqa supporters left.

== Siege and massacre ==
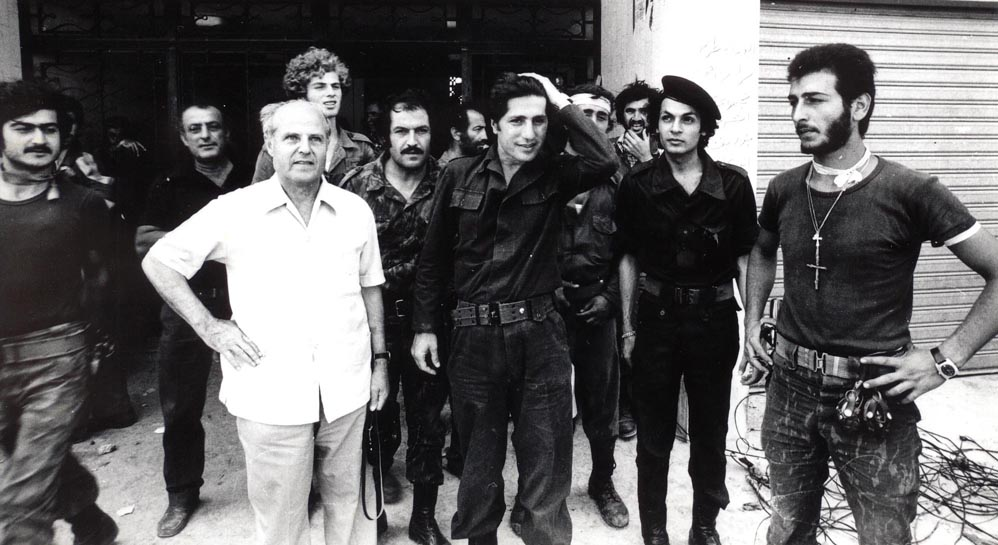
Phalange-commander William Hawi (wearing a white shirt) with Amine Gemayel, son of the founder of the right-wing Kataeb Party, at Tel al-Zaatar

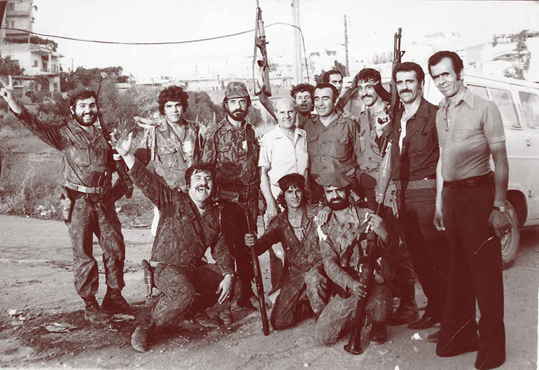
Hawi (center) with some of his fighters during the siege

Tel al-Zaatar came under siege in early January 1976, when Maronite Christian militias blockaded the camp, preventing food, medicine, and water from getting to the camp's inhabitants.

A "full-scale attack" against Tel al-Zaatar began in June 1976.

In July, Phalange commander William Hawi was killed in the battle of Tel al-Zaatar and was replaced by Bashir Gemayyel.

The PLO leadership capitulated and the camp fell on 12 August. Helena Cobban wrote that:

[...] the Front militias finally succeeded in ‘cleaning’ Tel al-Zaatar. As the women and children from the camp underwent the now familiar exodus to West Beirut on over-crowded trucks, the victorious Front fighters picked out all the men and youths they could spot, for summary execution. An estimated 1500 camp residents were killed that day, out of a total estimated at 2200 residents killed throughout the whole period of the siege.
Still elated by their victory, the Front militiamen proudly showed Western correspondents round the carnage in the camp. Then, after it had been picked clean by local looters, they brought in bulldozers to raze it to the ground.

Approximately 2000-3000 Palestinians had been killed in total since the beginning of the siege. (Note: Harris (1996: 165) states that "perhaps 3,000 Palestinians, mostly civilians, died in the siege and its aftermath"Faces of Lebanon: sects, wars, and global extensions. 1 July 1997.) Yezid Sayigh estimated 4,280 people were killed in total throughout the siege and massacre, including combatants. Approximately 12,000 Palestinians were displaced from the camp after its conquest and destruction.

== Aftermath ==
According to Robert Fisk, many of the survivors of the massacre blamed Yasser Arafat for the high death count. Arafat had encouraged those in Tel al-Zaatar to go on fighting despite the fact that they were hopelessly outnumbered and that a ceasefire was on the table, appealing to those in the camp to turn Tel al-Zaatar into "a Stalingrad"; Arafat had reportedly hoped to maximize the number of "martyrs" and thereby "capture the attention of the world." When Arafat visited the survivors, who had been relocated to Damour after Palestinian militias had massacred the civilian population there, he was reportedly shouted down as a "traitor" and pelted with rotten vegetables.

The siege enabled Bachir Gemayal to strengthen his position as the head of the Unified Military Command of the Lebanese Front militias. The siege of Tel al-Zaatar also softened the LNM's friction with the Lebanese-led army and as a result, Syria broke off its offensive on the PLO and the LNM, and agreed to an Arab League summit which temporarily suspended hostilities in Lebanon.

Hafez al-Assad received strong criticism and pressure from across the Arab world for his involvement in the battle. This criticism, as well as the internal dissent it caused as an Alawite ruler in a majority Sunni country, led to a cease-fire in his war on the Palestinian militia forces. The fall of the camp resulted in commando migration to the south, particularly to the central enclave of Bint-Jubail-Aytarun and the eastern enclave of Khiam-Tayiba where tension escalated.

== Historiography and analysis ==
Bassam Khawaja wrote that "As with much of Lebanese history from the civil war period, the details of the massacre are difficult to pinpoint with satisfactory reliability due to a scarcity of sources, as well as contradictions among the sources that do exist."

=== Female political activism ===
Lebanon, at this time, was experiencing a period of “gender anxiety” characterized by a struggle among paternal privilege. The siege of Tel al-Zaatar was a key moment that had women participating in political activism. During the 1976 siege, women were heavily involved at all levels. This ranged from arranging relief events to a substantial number of women fighting alongside.

== See also ==
- List of extrajudicial killings and political violence in Lebanon
- Palestinian refugee camps
  - Nabatieh refugee camp
- War of the Camps
- Sabra and Shatila massacre

== Bibliography ==
- George W. Ball, Error and betrayal in Lebanon, Foundation for Middle East Peace, Washington, D.C. 1984. ISBN 0-9613707-1-8
- Helena Cobban, The Making of Modern Lebanon, Hutchinson, London 1985. ISBN 0091607914
- William W. Harris, Faces of Lebanon: Sects, Wars, and Global Extensions, Princeton Series on the Middle East, Markus Wiener Publishers, Princeton, New Jersey, 1997. ISBN 978-1558761155
