= Nabatieh refugee camp =

Palestinian refugee camp in southern Lebanon

Coordinates: 33.375413°N 35.464576°E

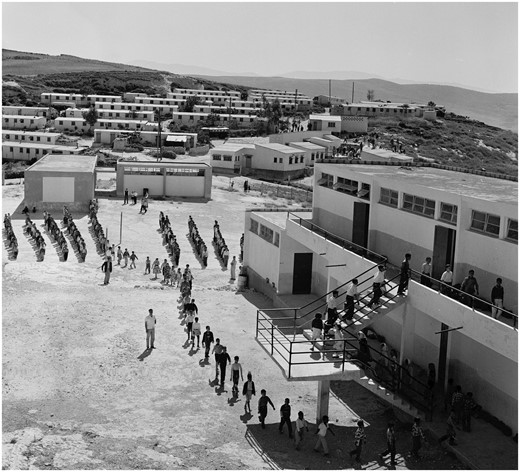
Nabatieh refugee camp circa 1969

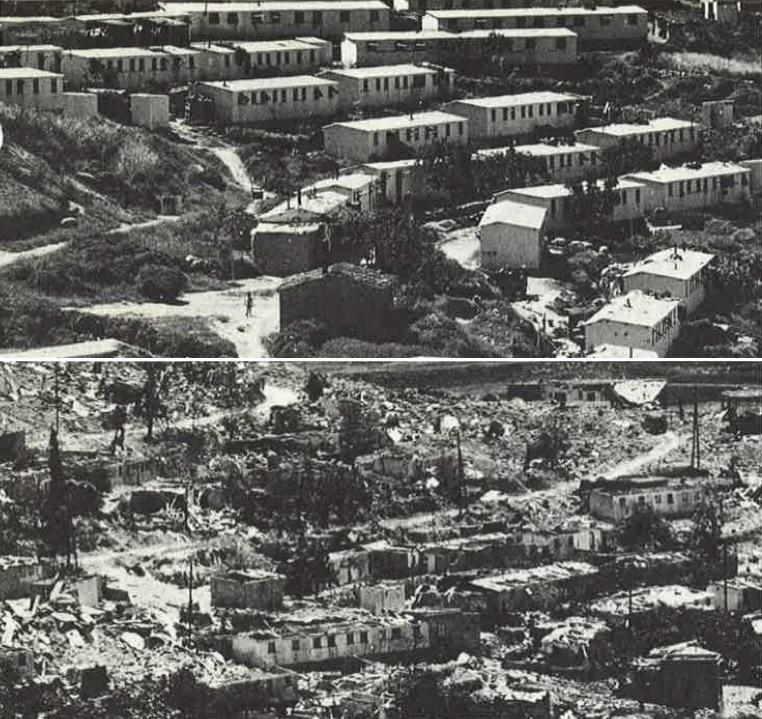
Nabatieh camp before and after its destruction by the Israeli military on 16 May 1974

Nabatieh (Note: Arabic: نبطية, also transliterated as Nabatiyeh) refugee camp was a Palestinian refugee camp in southern Lebanon. Established in 1956 by UNRWA, the camp was destroyed by Israel in 1974. (Note: Siklawi, Rami. “The Palestinian Refugee Camps in Lebanon Post 1990: Dilemmas of Survival and Return to Palestine.” Arab Studies Quarterly 41, no. 1 (2019): 78–94. https://doi.org/10.13169/arabstudquar.41.1.0078. "before 1976 there had been 15 official Palestinian refugee camps in Lebanon (recognized by the UNRWA); however, Nabatiyeh refugee camp was completely destroyed and wiped out by Israel in 1974; Tal al-Zatar and Nab'a Palestinian refugee camps were both located in East Beirut, they were completely destroyed by the right-wing militias in 1976") Conducted as a retaliation for the Ma'alot massacre, the Israeli bombing of the camp killed 27-50 people and injured 100-184. (Note: Time magazine, Middle East: Bullets, Bombs and a Sign of Hope, 27 May 1974. "The air assaults were far more devastating than the Lebanese or the Palestinians could have expected. This time the Israelis hit not just fedayeen strong posts but also camps occupied by civilian refugees. [...] The heaviest casualties were at Nabatieh, another refugee camp populated by about 5,000 Palestinians. The Israelis hit there in waves; two hours after the initial attack, more jets swooped down even as rescue workers were still clawing through the rubble for survivors. In the multiple strikes a total of 30 people were killed and at least 100 wounded. The camp was so badly damaged that bulldozers were brought in to level it.")

The 1974 film They Do Not Exist by Palestinian filmmaker Mustafa Abu Ali documents the destruction of the camp.

== See also ==
- Tel al-Zaatar refugee camp
