= 1976 Arab League summit (Cairo) =

Meeting of Arab regional organization

Arab League summit 8th Arab League Summit
- Host country: Egypt
- Dates: October 25, 1976- October 26, 1976
- Cities: Cairo
- Participants: Egypt; Saudi Arabia; Syria; Jordan
- Follows: 1976 Arab League summit (Riyadh)
- Precedes: 1978 Arab League summit

The 1976 Arab League summit was held on October 25 in Cairo, Egypt less than two weeks after the Riyadh summit. The summit had a wider Arab participation and was dedicated to following up on the deteriorating situation in Lebanon. The outcome of the summit was the formation, funding, and deployment of an Arab peacekeeping force in Lebanon.

== See also ==
- 1976 Arab League summit (Riyadh)
- Lebanese Civil War
