= Joseph Torbey =

Lebanese banker

- Occupation: Banker
- Spouse: Gladys Matar
- Children: 2

Joseph Torbey (Arabic: جوزيف طربيه, from Tannourine) is a Lebanese banker, the Chairman of the Crédit Libanais bank and the head of the World Union of Arab Bankers (WUAB).

== Biography ==
Born in Beirut, Joseph Torbey holds a PhD in Law from the University of Lyon in France, and studied Public administration and Business Taxation at the University of Southern California, Los Angeles.

He was head of the Income Tax Department at the Ministry of Finance from 1970 to 1988. In 1988, he became the Chairman of Crédit Libanais. He was the president of the Association of Banks in Lebanon (ABL) from 2001 to 2005, 2009-2013 and 2015–2019.

In 2006, he became the head of the World Union of Arab Bankers (WUAB). He is also president of the Maronite League from 2007 to 2013.

== See also ==
- Salim Sfeir
- Antoun Sehnaoui
- Naïm Abou-Jaoudé
- Ayoub-Farid Michel Saab
