= Guardians of the Cedars =

Lebanese far-right ultranationalist political party and former militia

- حراس الأرز
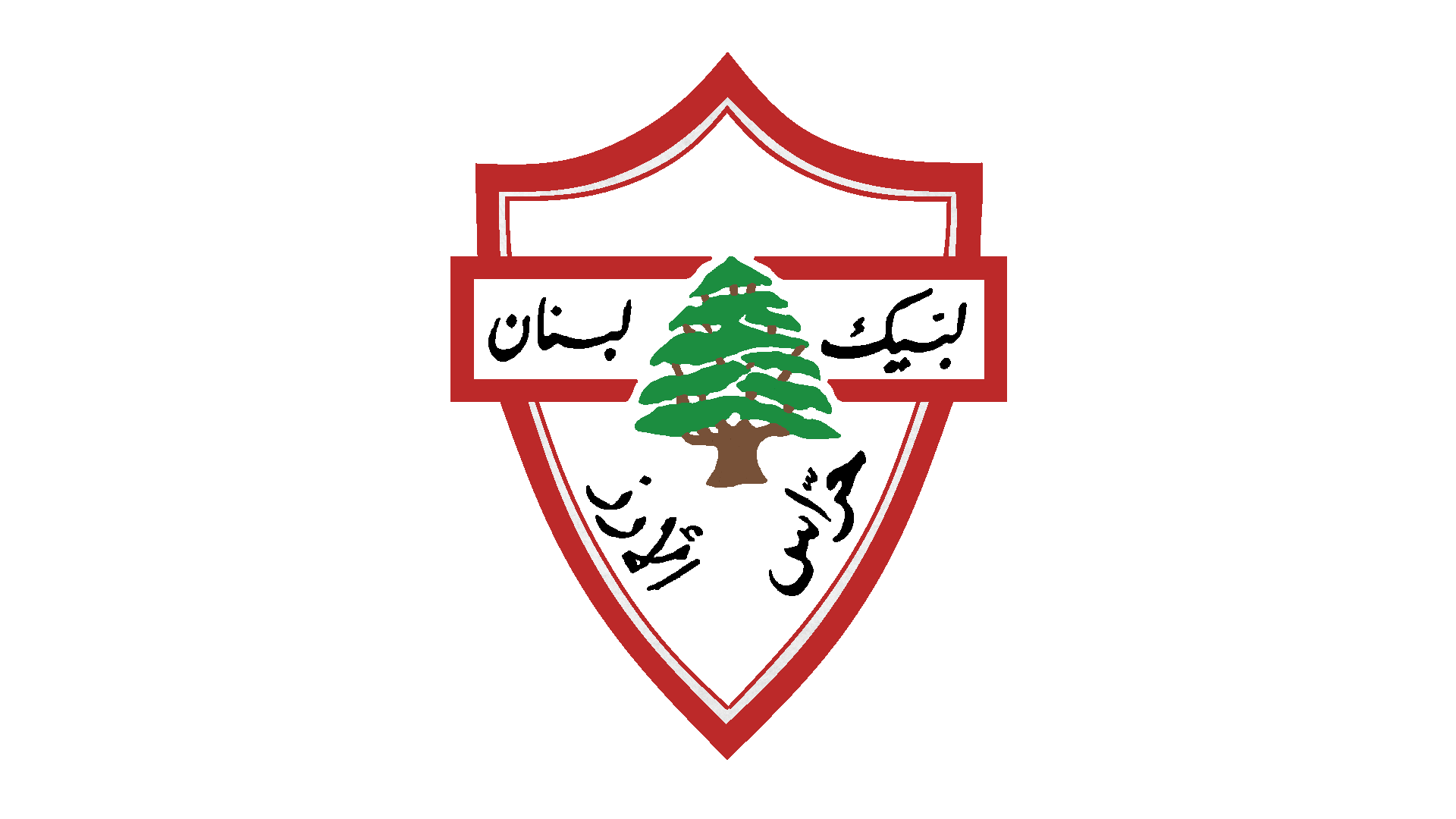
- Flag of the Guardians of the Cedars (1974–1990). The motto can be loosely translated as "At your service, Lebanon".
- Leader: Etienne Saqr
- Dates active: 1975–1990
- Country: Lebanon
- Headquarters: Achrafieh (Beirut), Sabbah
- Active regions: East Beirut, Mount Lebanon, South Lebanon
- Ideology: Lebanese nationalism Ultranationalism; Ethnic nationalism Social conservatism Anti-communism; Anti-Palestinianism; Secularism; Anti-Pan Arabism; Phoenicianism
- Political position: Far-right
- Status: Outlawed
- Part of: Lebanese Renewal Party; Lebanese Front; Lebanese Forces
- Wars: Lebanese civil war

The Guardians of the Cedars (GoC; Arabic: حراس الأرز; Ḥurrās al-Arz) was a Lebanese nationalist party and former militia in Lebanon. It was formed by Étienne Saqr (also known with the kunya "Abu Arz" or "Father of the Cedars") and others along with the Lebanese Renewal Party in the early 1970s. It operated in the Lebanese Civil War under the slogan: Lebanon, at your service. The militia was explicitly anti-Palestinian, and gained a reputation for brutality against Palestinian fighters.

== Creation ==
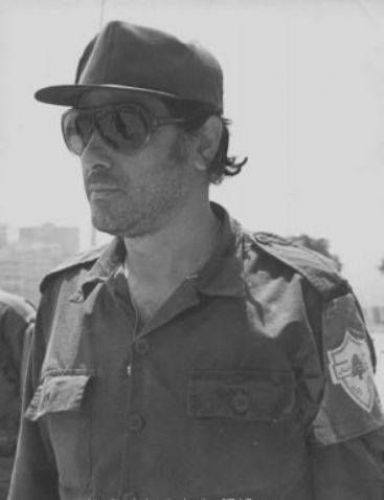
Etienne Saqr at Tel al-Zaatar, 1976.

The Guardians of the Cedars started to form a militia in the years leading up to the Lebanese Civil War and commenced military operations in April 1975.

In September 1975, Communiqué No. 1 was issued to denounce advocates of the partition of Lebanon. The second communiqué contained a bitter attack on the Palestinians. The third articulated the party's stance on the issue of Lebanese identity: Lebanon should dissociate itself from Arabism. The party spread its messages by means of graffiti in East Beirut, including slogans against Syria, the Palestinian Resistance, and Pan-Arabism, sometimes with violent anti-Palestinian tones, as in the slogan على كل لبناني ان يقتل فلسطينياً ("It is a duty for each Lebanese to kill a Palestinian").

The Guardians of the Cedars joined other pro-status quo, mainly Christian Lebanese, militias in 1976 to form the Lebanese Front.

=== 1970s ===
In March 1976, they confronted Palestinian and leftist forces in West Beirut. A Guardians unit was also dispatched to Zaarour, above the mountain road to Zahlé, to support Phalangist forces. In April, Guardian fighters held a line in the area of Hadath, Kfar Shima, and Bsaba, south of Beirut, against a coalition of Palestinian, PSP, and SSNP forces.

In the summer of 1976, the Guardians were among the first militias to assault Tel al-Zaatar, the last remaining Palestinian refugee camp in east Beirut. The camp fell after a 52-day siege.

The actions of the Guardians and their allies following the capture of the camp have been widely reported as amounting to a massacre of many of its civilian inhabitants. During this battle, Saqr led a unit of Guardians force to Chekka, where Christian civilians were being sieged by leftist-Palestinian forces, and fought off the Palestinian forces.

The Guardians and allied Christian militias then invaded the Koura region in northern Lebanon and reached Tripoli, to support Christian residents trapped by fighting. In 1978 as part of the Lebanese Front they did small attacks on the Syrian army in Beirut and again in 1981 in the Battle of Zahle. This came after the alliance between the Phalanges and most Christian groups with the Syrians had taken a twist.

During the war, the Guardians earned a reputation for specializing in cruelty. Militia members usually tied Palestinian prisoners to the backs of taxis and then dragged them up the motorway into Jounieh. Their carcasses would then be flung into a dried-up riverbed. Commanding his followers to slay all Palestinians, Saqr once stated, "If you feel compassion for the Palestinian women and children, remember they are communists and will bear new communists".

=== 1980s ===
In 1985 the Guardians of the Cedars mounted a fierce defense of Kfar-Fallus and Jezzine, battling Palestinians and Shiite-Druze militias and protected thousands of Christians in South Lebanon.

Towards the close of the 1980s, and continuing to 2000, most of the remaining fighting in Lebanon occurred in the south, inside the Israeli-occupied zone, under the Southern-Lebanese-Army influence led by Saad Haddad and later by Antoine Lahd, the latter who had close ties with the National Liberal Party (Al Ahrar in Arabic). The Guardians and other militias were largely reorganized into the South Lebanon Army, preserving much of the early ideology while adopting new military tactics.

== Military structure and organization ==
The LRP militia began to be quietly raised in 1974 by Sakr in his capacity as president of the Party, though it was only in September 1975 when they made their existence public in an official communiqué as the Guardians of the Cedars. Headquartered at the main LRP party' Offices in Ashrafieh and personally commanded by Sakr, the GoC initially numbered some 500 men and women trained by Kayrouz Baraket, a young Lebanese Army officer, and equipped with obsolete firearms purchased on the black market. Although the membership of the GoC was exclusively Maronite, Sakr allegedly maintained a loyal personal bodyguard made up of Lebanese Shia Muslims, but little is known about them. The collapse of the Lebanese Army in January 1976 allowed Sakr to recruit army deserters and seize some heavy equipment from its barracks and Internal Security Forces (ISF) Police stations, swelling the GoC ranks to 3,000-6,000 uniformed militiamen armed with modern small-arms. Besides being provided with funds and training by the Kataeb Party and the Al-Tanzim, the Guardians also claimed to have received direct aid from Israel as early as 1974. They were the only faction of the Lebanese Front that never received any military aid from Syria, which is hardly surprising, given their strong anti-Syrian views.

=== Weapons and equipment ===
They fielded a mechanized force consisting of a single M50 Super Sherman medium tank, some BTR-152 and M113 armored personnel carriers, a few M42A1 Duster SPAAGs and Chaimite V200 armoured cars backed by gun trucks or technicals. The latter consisted of UAZ-469, Land-Rover series II-III, Santana Series III (Spanish-produced version of the Land-Rover series III), Toyota Land Cruiser (J40), Dodge Power Wagon W200, Dodge D series (3rd generation), Jeep J20 pickup trucks, GMC Sierra Custom K25/K30, Chevrolet C-10/C-15 Cheyenne and Chevrolet C-20 Scottsdale light pickups, plus Chevrolet C-50 medium-duty trucks and GMC C4500 medium-duty trucks, GMC C7500 heavy-duty trucks and M34 2½-ton 6x6 cargo trucks armed with heavy machine guns (HMGs), recoilless rifles and anti-aircraft autocannons.

=== Activities and areas of operations ===
In stark contrast to other Christian factions, the LRP/GoC despised any illegal activities such as drug-trafficking, extortion or looting, and their leader Sakr never sought to establish an autonomous personal fiefdom. Although the Guardians' claimed that they did not center their military operations on 'turf', they did maintain strongholds at the Maronite quarters of East Beirut, the adjacent Matn District (Laqluk, near Akoura), the Batroun District (Tannourine), the eastern Keserwan District (Ayoun es-Simane) and the Jabal Amel region (Kfar Falous, Jezzine, Marjayoun, Qlaiaa, Ain Ebel and Rumeish). In May 1979 they even clashed with the NLP Tigers Militia in Beirut for control of the Furn esh Shebbak and Ain el-Rammaneh districts, and for the town of Akoura in the Byblos District.

== Political beliefs ==
The Guardians hold to several key beliefs:

- Lebanon is an ancient nation of unique ethnicity.
- Modern Lebanese people descended from the Phoenicians.
- Phoenicia was the father of early Western civilization.

This has led the Guardians of the Cedars to maintain that Lebanese people are not Arabs. The political consequence of this stance advocates the 'de-Arabization' of Lebanon. Similarly, followers draw a distinction between Arabic and 'Lebanese', aiming to restore the form created by Lebanese philosopher Said Akl. The Guardians of the Cedars have adopted positions hostile to Pan-Arabism. This is believed to be the main reason why they did not grow as a party in Lebanon outside the Maronite community.

Saqr himself had fought against pan-Arab forces back in the 1958 Lebanon crisis. During that time Camille Chamoun entered Lebanon in the Baghdad Pact led by the US, but faced stiff resistance from a huge section of the Lebanese people, and this later led to the failure of this alliance.

After heavy Palestinian involvement in the Lebanese Civil War, the Guardians cultivated ties with the Israeli military, receiving weapons and support. Some followers maintain that this was a collaboration of necessity, and not an ideological agreement with the Israelis. Others disagree, claiming that collaboration with Israel was based on the conviction that there was a commonality of interest between the two countries. Other similarly aligned militias, such as the Phalangists' Kataeb Regulatory Forces and the Ahrar's Tigers, also cooperated semi-secretly with Israel. This cooperation was later emphasized by Saqr who said: "Lebanon's power is in Israel's power, and Lebanon's weakness lies in Israel's weakness".

This alliance with Israel played a major role in banning the party, and expelling its members who mostly fled to Israel. Saqr, who now lives in Nicosia, Cyprus, has since admitted that Israel has been funding the group throughout its existence, even before the war began. Saqr is now considered as a traitor to the Lebanese government, alongside the likes of Antoine Lahad who resided in Tel Aviv under Mossad protection until his death in 2015.

According to an Israeli military observer Haim 'Arev, the soldiers of the Guardians of the Cedars were the best and most experienced fighters among the militias that constituted the Lebanese Front. He draws a direct connection between the patriotic ideology of the Guardians and the superior battle capacity of their fighters. He states that while the Guardians were among the smaller parties of the Lebanese Civil war, its idealistic men and women were soldiers of the best caliber. Later, in Southern Lebanon, the Guardians fighters had a reputation for being exceptionally motivated and among the toughest fighters in the ranks of the SLA.

== Front of the Guardians of the Cedar ==
The Front of the Guardians of the Cedar – FGoC (Arabic: الجبهة لحراس الأرز transliteration Al-Jabhat li-Hurras el-Arz), sometimes known by its Arabic acronym, JIHA, was a pre-dominantly Christian right-wing grouping that appeared in 1974. Apparently a splinter of the Guardians of the Cedars, they held similar views to those of this party – expressed just prior to the war in anti-Palestinian graffiti bearing the 'JIHA' signature scrubbed in the walls of east Beirut's buildings – very little is known about this small and obscure organization. Estimated at about 100 members, the JIHA operated mainly in the eastern sector of the Lebanese Capital during the 1975-77 phase of the Lebanese Civil War, but nothing was heard from them afterwards. It is assumed that they might have been re-absorbed into the GoC or by the Lebanese Forces in 1977.

== Attitude towards Palestinians and Lebanese Muslims ==
The GoC was strongly anti-Palestinian, and argued for the forcible removal of all Palestinians and other non-Lebanese (e.g. Syrians) from Lebanon, both civilians and armed fighters. GoC leader Saqr summed up the organization's attitude to Palestinians in an interview with the Jerusalem Post on July 23, 1982:

"It is the Palestinians we have to deal with. Ten years ago there were 84,000; now there are between 600,000 and 700,000. In six years there will be two million. We can't let it come to that." His solution: "Very simple. We shall drive them to the borders of brotherly Syria ... Anyone who looks back, stops or returns will be shot on the spot. We have the moral right, reinforced by well-organized public relations plans and political preparations."

However, in contrast to the policies of many other sectarian militias (such as the Kataeb), and to their own attitudes towards Palestinians, the Guardians took some care to avoid the impression of religious conflict. The party, while being essentially a Christian militia and in violent conflict with most Muslim militias during the war, was formally secularist as it publicly stressed this secular nationalist identity that both Muslims and Christians could share.

== End of the militia ==
1989 saw the Guardians once more fighting the Syrians alongside the Lebanese Army in support of the military interim government of General Michel Aoun. In a statement in 1990, the GoC greeted the occupation of Kuwait by Saddam Hussein by asserting that "Arabism is the undisputed lie of the 20th century." The Guardians called upon the people to rally around the leadership of General Aoun, and demanded the withdrawal of Lebanon from the Arab League.

As the Lebanese Civil War drew to a close in 1990, political changes weakened the right-wing movements which had existed in earlier decades. In October 1990, as part of the end of the war, the reorganized Lebanese government forced Prime Minister Aoun out of power under Syrian demands and commands. From this year on, Syria occupied Lebanon until its withdrawal in 2005.

Samir Geagea's Lebanese Forces militia captured Etienne Saqr because he had supported Aoun. During this incident, he suffered an unspecified injury. He was forced to seek refuge in Jezzine, and finally left Lebanon for Europe after Israel pulled its forces out of Lebanon in 2000. Several other members of the Guardians are presently wanted by the Lebanese government, in order to answer for war-crimes.

From the end of the civil war in 1990 until the Israeli withdrawal from Lebanon in 2000 the Guardians of the Cedars formed an element of the now-defunct South Lebanon Army. Since that date their military operations have ceased and they operate solely politically, campaigning to remove the Syrian presence in Lebanon. In common with the Christian and Sunni-dominated March 14 Alliance, the party has expressed its support for the Syrian uprising.

== Movement of Lebanese Nationalism ==
Today, the reorganized Guardians of the Cedars is a legal and fully functional political party; lately, the term Movement of Lebanese Nationalism (Arabic: حركة القومية اللبنانية transliterated as Harakat al-Qawmiyya al-Lubnaniyya) abbreviated as MLN was added to its name and it is now known as The Guardians of the Cedars Party - Movement of Lebanese Nationalism (in Arabic حزب حراس الأرز- حركة القومية اللبنانية).

== See also ==
- Al-Tanzim
- Battle of the Hotels
- Etienne Saqr
- Front for the Liberation of Lebanon from Foreigners
- Lebanese Front
- Lebanese Forces
- Lebanese Civil War
- List of weapons of the Lebanese Civil War
- Karantina massacre
- South Lebanon Army
- Siege of Tel al-Zaatar
