= Dekwaneh =

Dekwaneh دكوانة
- City
- Location within Lebanon
- Coordinates: 33°52′45″N 35°32′37″E
- Country: Lebanon
- Governorate: Mount Lebanon Governorate
- District: Matn District

Government
  - Time Zone: GMT +2 (UTC)
  - - Summer (DST): +3 (UTC)
  - Area Code(s): (+961) 1
- Time zone: UTC+2 (EET)
  - Summer (DST): UTC+3 (EEST)
- Dialing code: +961

Dekwaneh (or Dekweneh; Arabic: دكوانة) is a suburb north of Beirut in the Matn District of the Mount Lebanon Governorate, Lebanon. The population is predominantly Maronite Christian. Tel al-Zaatar, an UNRWA administered Palestinian refugee camp housing approximately 50,000-60,000 refugees, and the site of the Tel al-Zaatar massacre were located on the outskirts of the town.

== Archaeology ==
Dekwaneh I is about 700 metres (2,300 ft) northwest of Mar Roucos monastery, in the gullies of (now deforested) pinewood slopes on the west side of a ridge. Material was found by Raoul Describes, who mentioned rock-shelters in the area that were destroyed by quarrying for quicklime. Further collections were found by Auguste Bergy and Peter Wescombe. Some of the flint tools recovered were determined to be Acheulean as well as a large amount of waste and bifaces from the Middle Paleolithic that suggested it was a factory site at that time.

Dekwaneh II material comes from various locations around the area, most notably the ravine below the monastery. Flint tools were also found here by Bergy and Describes which included the Qaraoun culture's Heavy Neolithic forms such as massive axes, picks, scrapers and rabots. Other early Neolithic tools were found along with some Middle Paleolithic material including an Emireh point and tortoise cores. Along with material from Dekwaneh I, finds from the locations are stored in the Museum of Lebanese Prehistory.

== History ==
Historically, Dekwaneh was an agricultural settlement within the Metn District. During the late Ottoman Empire and the French Mandate, the area consisted largely of orchards and rural estates. Following Lebanese independence, the town underwent rapid urbanization, evolving into a primary industrial zone for Beirut. In 1949, the Tel al-Zaatar refugee camp was established on the town's eastern perimeter. By the 1960s, the coexistence of a high-density refugee enclave and a predominantly Christian residential and industrial workforce made Dekwaneh a significant political and demographic fault line in the capital’s suburbs.

In the years preceding the formal outbreak of the Lebanese Civil War, Dekwaneh was the site of frequent extrajudicial violence involving local militias and Palestinian fedayeen factions:

- July 12, 1973: Four Maronite residents were summarily executed in the town. This event is documented as a major early breach of the 1969 Cairo Agreement, signifying the collapse of state security around the camp perimeters.
- April 13, 1974: Exactly one year prior to the "Bus Massacre" in Ain el-Rummaneh, Palestinian militants executed seven Christian travelers at a roadblock in Dekwaneh. Historians identify this as a critical precursor to the systemic "identity card" violence of the war.
- July 1, 1974: Following a series of kidnappings, a large-scale urban skirmish erupted between Palestinian factions and local volunteers from the Kataeb and NLP, resulting in an estimated 10–15 casualties.
- July 29, 1974: Four Maronite commuters were executed at an illegal roadblock established near the entrance to the Dekwaneh industrial zone.
- January 22, 1975: Four Maronite laborers were intercepted and executed by militants near the industrial factories, triggering the first major wave of Christian civilian displacement from the neighborhoods immediately bordering the camp.
- November 12, 1975: During the "Two-Year War," Dekwaneh was subjected to heavy shelling. Approximately 25 civilians were killed in house-to-house combat as factions of the Lebanese National Movement (LNM) attempted to secure supply lines through the industrial sector.

Following the 1976 Siege of Tel al-Zaatar, the camp was razed. In the post-war era, Dekwaneh was rebuilt as a commercial and educational center, hosting several branches of the Lebanese University.

== LGBT rights ==
Dekwaneh gained notoriety in the press and social media when, on Monday 22 April 2013, the mayor, Antoine Chakhtoura, ordered Lebanese security forces to raid and shut down a gay-friendly nightclub called Ghost. A number of Syrian gay men and a Lebanese transgender woman were arrested during the raid and taken to municipal headquarters where it is reported that they were harassed and forced to undress. According to reports, the transgender woman was also photographed naked.

== Image gallery ==
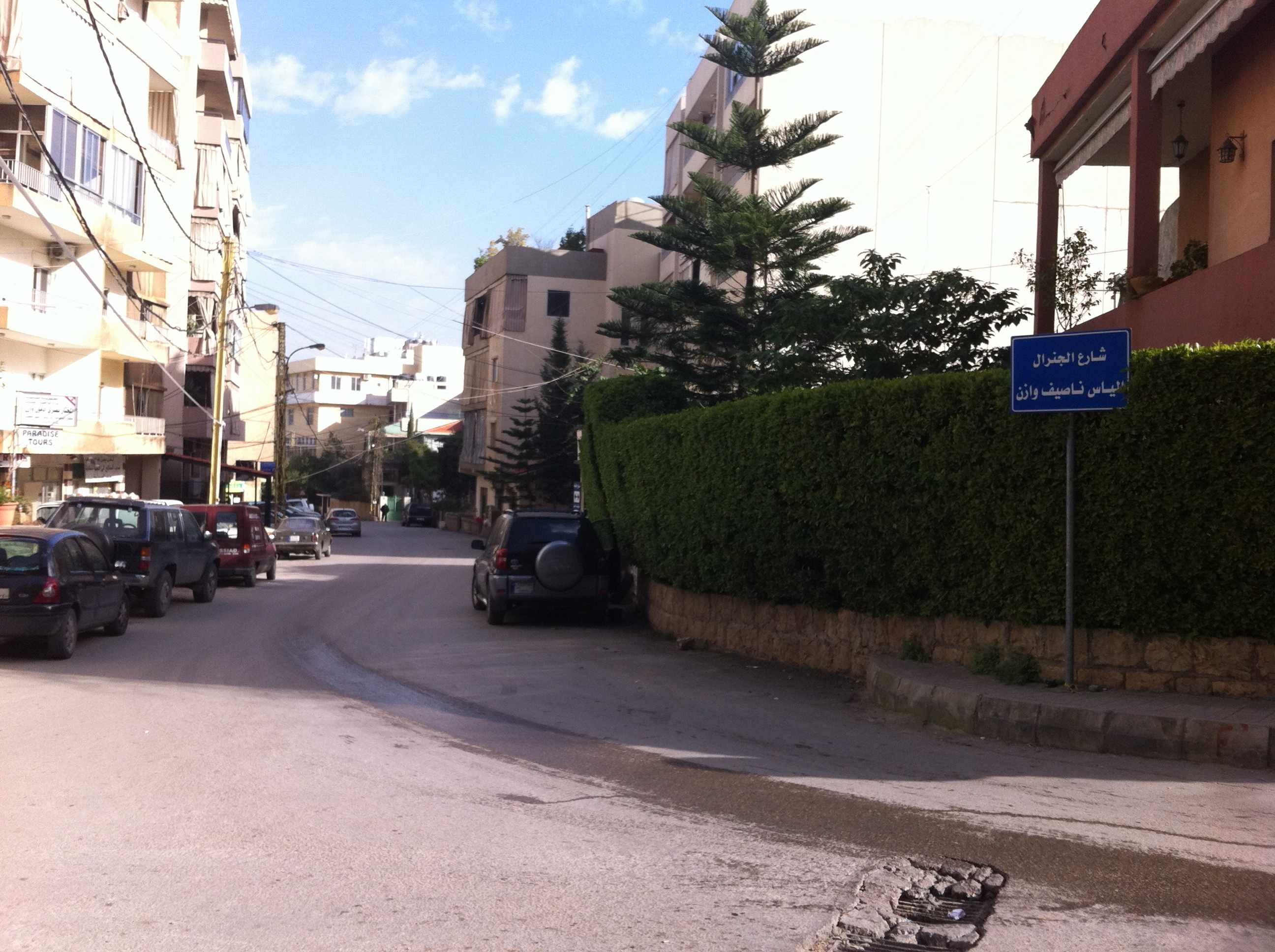
General Elias Wessin (Wazen) Street in Dekwaneh, Lebanon.

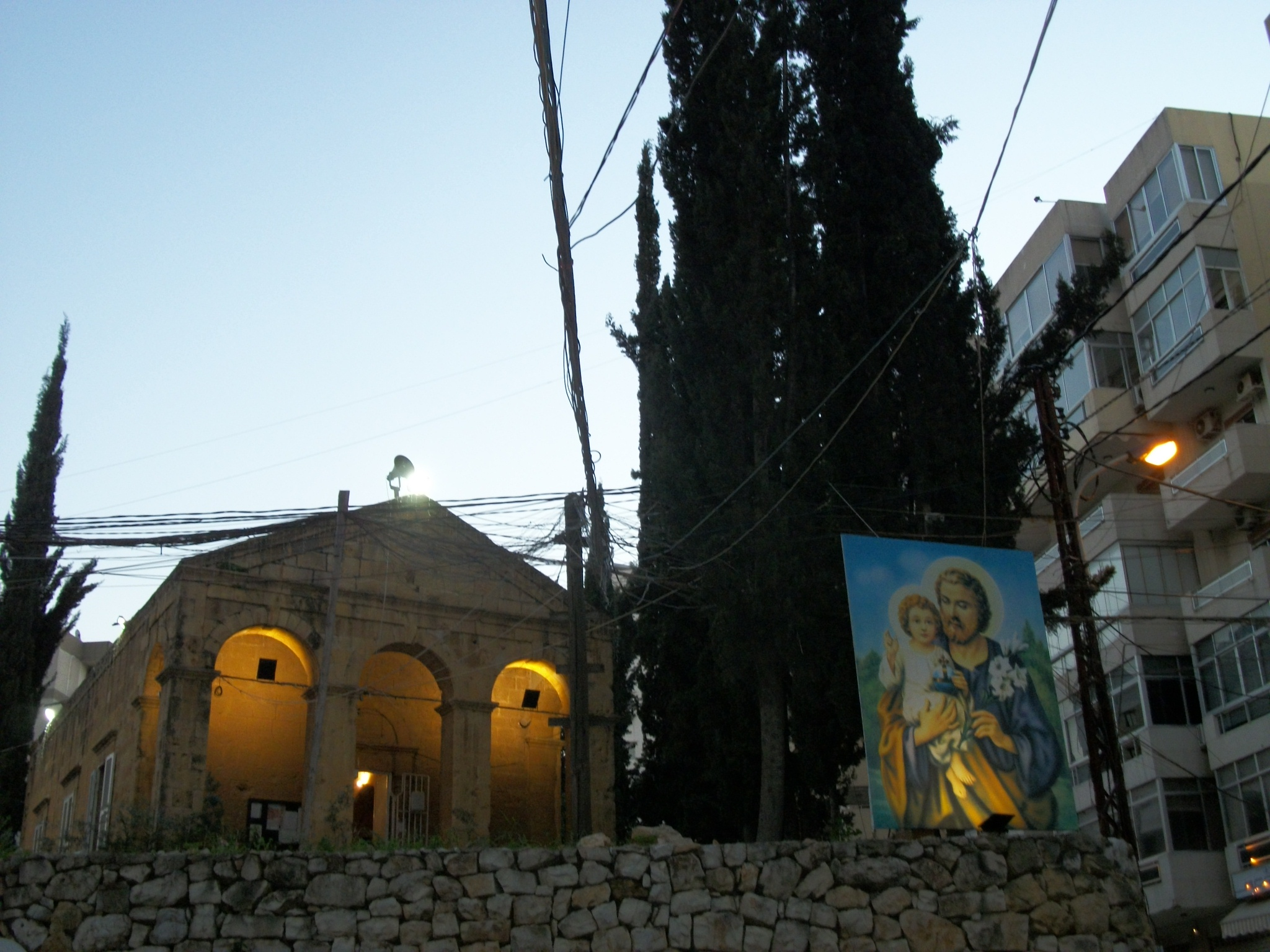
St. Joseph chapel

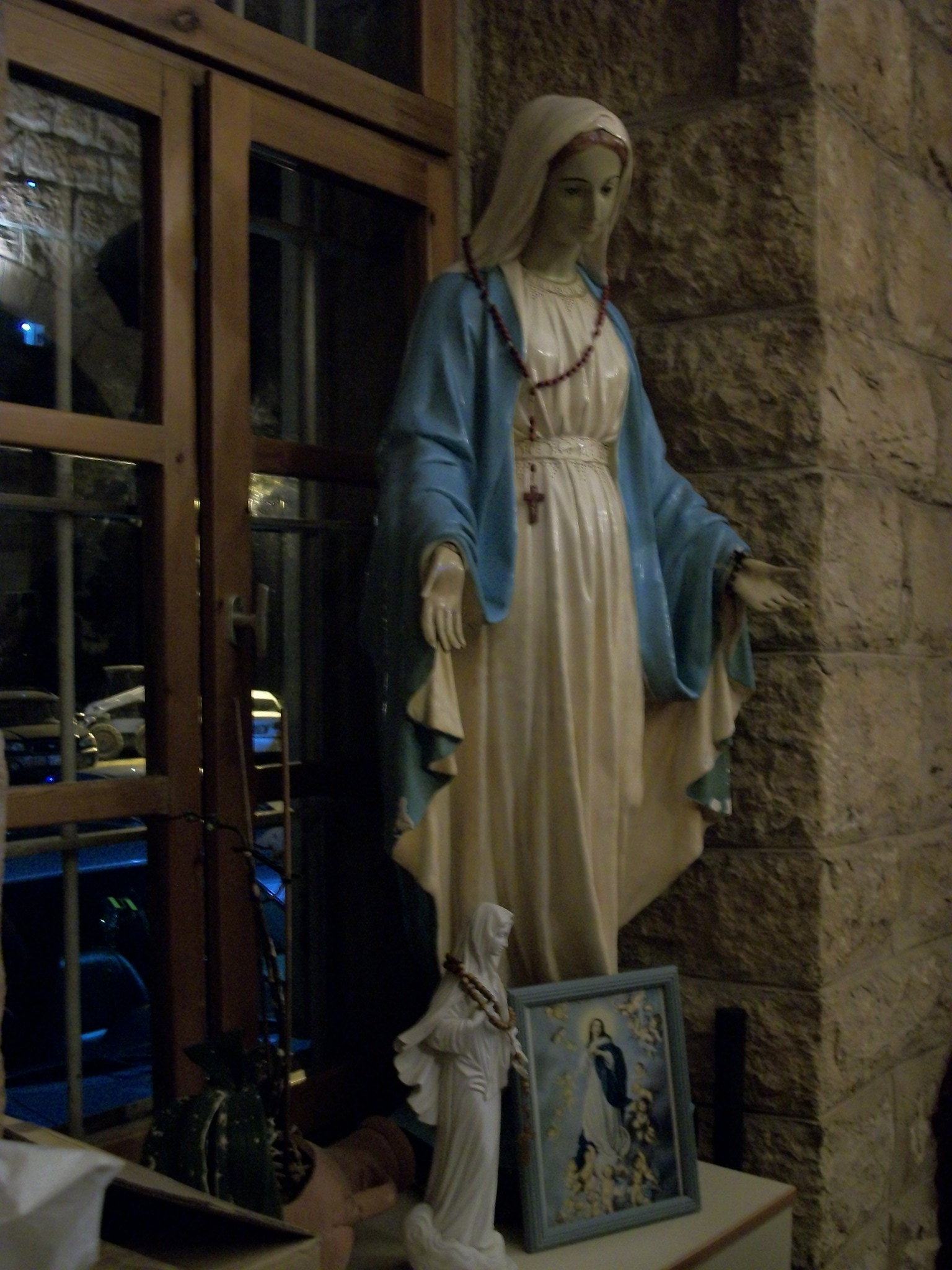
Statue of the Immaculate Conception

== Airfield ==
Remains of a former airfield can be found in Tal El Zaatar. Only a small section of runway exist with Northern section along Mar Roukoz has been reused for commercial warehouses.

== See also ==
- List of extrajudicial killings and political violence in Lebanon
