= East Beirut canton =

Former geopolitical region in Lebanon

East Beirut canton إقليم شرق بيروت (Arabic) ʼIqlīm Ŝarq Bayrūt
- 1976–13 October 1990
- Flag of the Lebanese Forces militia

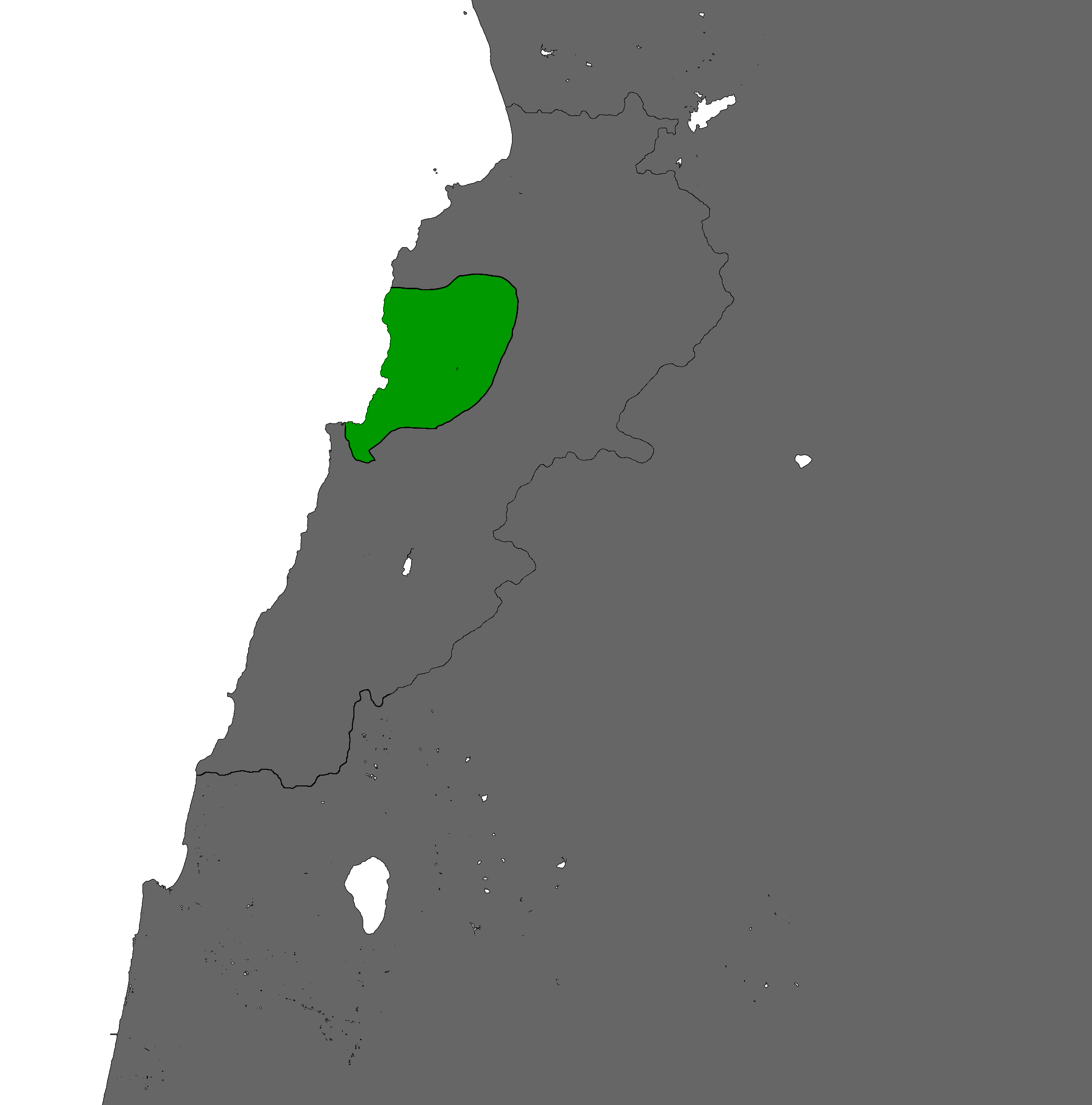
- Status: Militia-controlled territory
- Capital: Jounieh
- Common languages: Arabic
- Religion: Christianity

Government
  - Governed by: Lebanese Forces
- Historical era: Lebanese Civil War
  - Formation: 1976
  - Hundred Days' War: 1978
  - Bachir Gemayel's Assassination: 1982
  - Lebanese Forces coup: 1986
  - War of Liberation: 1989–1990
  - Taif agreement and the end of the Lebanese Civil War: 13 October 1990

Population
- 800,000
- Currency: Lebanese Pound
Preceded by	Succeeded by
Lebanon	Second Lebanese Republic
- Today part of: Lebanon

The East Beirut canton, also known as Kfarshima–Madfoun or Marounistan, was a Christian militia-controlled territory that existed in Lebanon from 1976 until its gradual erosion following the Taif Agreement and the end of the country's civil war. It was one of the wartime state-like territories, controlled by the Lebanese Forces (LF) militia, and was separated in the Lebanese capital, Beirut, from Muslim majority West Beirut by the Green Line, extending outside the capital northward to include the region of Keserwan up till the city of Byblos on the western coast and the northern part of Mount Lebanon to the northeast. It bordered the Zgharta region to the north, which was controlled by a rival Christian militia, the Marada Brigade which controlled a canton known as the Northern canton.

East Beirut was a semi-independent region, from which Syrian troops stationed in Lebanon were mostly absent. It had its own security and legal apparatus, with the LF also providing the local population with subsidized services, including public transport, education and healthcare among others. The canton had more than 60% of the country's industrial capacity. In 1976, to finance its war effort, the LF established the "National Treasury" in order to manage its revenue, mainly through direct taxation of the canton's population, among other sources.

== Background ==
As central government authority disintegrated and rival governments claimed national authority, the various parties and militias started to create comprehensive state administrations in their territory. These were known as cantons, Swiss-like autonomous provinces. Marounistan was one of the first cantons to form. The Progressive Socialist Party's territory, which mostly served its Druze community, was the "Civil Administration of the Mountain," commonly known as the Jebel-el-Druze (a name which had formerly been used for a Druze state in Syria). The Marada area around Zgharta was known as the "Northern Canton".

== History ==
=== Inter-Christian fighting ===
In 1977, relations within the Lebanese Front became strained between the Lebanese Phalanges and its close allies in the Marada Movement. This follows a decision by the Phalanges to try to ally with Israel, which the Maradas, long-time allies of Syria and anti-Zionists, categorically refuse.

It was then that regular clashes between the phalanges of Bachir Gemayel and the Marada Brigade were reported, the most notable was in the killing of Tony Frangieh and other 35 people were killed during this surprise attack in 1978. This event is known as the Ehden massacre. The militia responded with an attack targeting Kataeb members in the Beqaa valley killing 26 people.

==== Tigers Resistance ====
Relations between the NLP political board and the Tigers' military command soured after the former, headed by Camille Chamoun, supported Syria's military intervention in June that year whereas the latter, now led by Camille's son Dany Chamoun, opposed it. Fearing that its own party's militia was getting out of his control, Camille tacitly allowed its Kataeb rivals to absorb the Tigers' into the Lebanese Forces (LF) under Bachir Gemayel. Dany's adamant refusal of allowing the Tigers to be incorporated led to a Phalangist assault on his militia's headquarters in Safra on July 7, 1980, which resulted in a massacre that claimed up to 500 lives, including civilians and 80 of Dany's men (other source states that the dead toll amounted to 150 Tigers' fighters).

=== War of Liberation and territorial Handover to the LAF ===
On 1 April 1990, during the War of Liberation, Elias Hrawi's government mandated Fleet Admiral Elie Hayek to take over LF barracks in the governorate. This was part of an agreement between Samir Geagea and Hrawi whereby the army would militarily and politically take over 2/3 of the canton (the remaining 1/3 being the Northern governorate and Achrafieh in East Beirut), but the militia’s 10,000 strong force would remain intact for the time being.

Michel Aoun, however, had publicly stated that he would not accept the handoff or any alliance between the LF and the Hrawi government. As the Elimination War was ravaging East Beirut and its suburbs (up to the Metn), the handoff actually began in Keserwan district – at the level of Nahr el-Kalb – up to Barbara.

By May, however, the LF had taken over the entire coastline from Jounieh to Beirut from Aoun’s troops, completely cutting off naval supply routes. In addition, Geagea placed Hayek in an LF barrack in Jounieh as a symbol of his willingness to integrate with the government, defying Aoun’s refusal of any Hrawi-LF alliance. These developments, combined with the Syrian army’s support, dramatically shifted the odds in favour of the Taif agreement and its government.

== Support and recognition ==
Although the canton was not recognized internationally as a sovereign state nor an administrative region, the region still garnered foreign support from namely the United States and Israel.

== Economy ==
Considered by many analysts as the best organized of all militia "fiefs" in the whole of Lebanon, it was administrated by a network of Phalangist-controlled business corporations headed by "Chef" Boutros Khawand, which included the GAMMA Group brain-trust, the DELTA computer company, and the SONAPORT holding. The latter run since 1975 the legal commercial ports of Jounieh and Beirut, including the infamous clandestine "Dock Five" (French: Cinquième basin), near the Karantina KRF's HQ, from which the Phalange extracted additional revenues by levying taxes and by conducting arms-dealing operations.

Wilton Wynn, a TIME correspondent, visited the Christian canton in 1976, the same year as its foundation. He reported that compared to the villages outside of the canton, in Maronite towns and villages no garbage littered the streets, gas was one-fifth the price charged in West Beirut and the price of bread was controlled to levels comparable to pre-war pricing.

== Pierre Gemayel International Airport ==
The Canton was also served by a clandestine-built airstrip, the Pierre Gemayel International Airport, opened in 1976 at Hamat, north of Batroun, and had its own radio station, The Voice of Lebanon (Arabic: Iza'at Sawt Loubnan) or La Voix du Liban (VDL) in French, set up in that same year. However, the airport was never used for civilian purposes. Although its heavily damaged runway has been patched, the airfield is currently used only by the Lebanese Air Force with Puma helicopters and Super Tucano light attack aircraft. The airfield is currently also used by the Special Forces school.

== Military ==
The region was defended by the Lebanese Front army brigades of 12,000 men, which was well-equipped by the United States, along with 5,000 militiamen under Samir Geagea and 1,000 belonging to Kataeb Regulatory Forces, supported by Israel. The brigades also included members of the Tigers Militia and the Guardians of the Cedars.

The militiamen were situated in a mountainous region which gave them an upper-hand against Syrian expansion westward of the country.

== In popular culture ==
A play titled "Min Kfarshima lal Madfoun" tells the story of a Maronite woman's journey from Kfarchima to Madfoun, starting from Tabaris in Achrafieh, through the Nahr El Kalb tunnel, then Jounieh and finally to Jbeil.

== See also ==
- West Beirut
- Kataeb Regulatory Forces
- Lebanese Armed Forces
- Lebanese Civil War
- Lebanese Front
- Lebanese Forces (militia)
- Internal Security Forces
- Zgharta Liberation Army
