= Cairo Agreement (1969) =

1969 agreement between Palestine and Lebanon

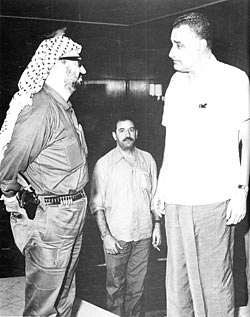
Yasser Arafat and Gamal Abdel Nasser discuss Black September civil war situation at emergency Arab League summit

The Cairo Agreement, or Cairo Accord, was an agreement reached on 2 November 1969 during talks between Yasser Arafat and the Lebanese army commander, General Emile Bustani. Egyptian President Gamal Abdel Nasser helped to broker the deal.

== Terms ==
Although the text of the agreement was never published, an unofficial version appeared in the Lebanese daily newspaper An-Nahar on 20 April 1970. According to the agreement, the presence and activities of Palestinian guerrillas in southeastern Lebanon would be tolerated and regulated by the Lebanese authorities.

Under the agreement, 16 UNRWA camps in Lebanon, home to 300,000 Palestinian refugees, were removed from the jurisdiction of the Lebanese Army's Deuxième Bureau and placed under the authority of the Palestinian Armed Struggle Command, a body under the PLO. Although the camps remained under Lebanese sovereignty, this meant that after 1969, they became a key popular base for the guerrilla movement.

The agreement also established the right of Palestinians in Lebanon to engage in armed struggle. The Palestinians were granted legal control over the refugee camps in Lebanon and the right to launch attacks against Israel from southern Lebanon. While this was essentially just a formalization of the existing situation, it granted the Palestinian guerrilla presence in the South uncontested authority and freedom. This combination, bolstered by the moral justification of revolution, weaponry, and machismo, fostered an attitude among the militants that led them to barely acknowledge the existence of the humble peasant-villagers working the land in what was now the guerrillas' battleground. The guerrillas quickly established control over the border area.

The Palestine Liberation Organization later effectively established a state within a state in Lebanon.

== Lebanese Civil War ==
Palestinian involvement increased in Lebanon in the early 1970s, especially after Black September in Jordan. Eventually, the Lebanese Army became incapable of limiting the areas of PLO activity. In April 1975, the Lebanese Civil War broke out in Lebanon between the PLO and the Christians. Several months later the leftist Lebanese National Movement entered the conflict on the side of the PLO.

After the alliance's military successes the right-wing Maronite president, Suleiman Frangieh, called upon Syria to intervene. The PLO then retreated to the south but continued guerrilla operations across the Lebanon-Israel border, which resulted in an Israeli invasion in March 1978.

Escalations in the conflict led ultimately to the Israeli invasion and occupation of Lebanon in the 1982 Lebanon War, resulting in expulsion of the PLO from South Lebanon.

== Annulment ==
In June 1987, Lebanese President Amine Gemayel signed a law to annul the Cairo Agreement with the PLO. The law was first drafted by Parliament Speaker Hussein el-Husseini and approved by the Lebanese Parliament on 21 May 1987, and signed by Prime Minister Salim El Hoss.

== See also ==
- Taif Agreement
