= Antoun Saad =

Lebanese military and intelligence official

Antoun Saad أنطون سعد
- Born: 1910; Toula el-Jebbi, Qada'a, Zgharta, Lebanon
- Died: 26 June 1977 (aged 66–67)
- Allegiance: Lebanon
- Branch: Lebanese Armed Forces
- Service years: 1930–1971
- Rank: Commander
- Conflicts: Battle of al-Malikiyah

Antoun Saad (Arabic: أنطون سعد, 1910 - 26 June 1977) was a Lebanese military and intelligence official, known for his tenure as head of the Second Bureau from 1958 to 1971 which coincided with a period of change and unrest in Lebanon. He was influential in shaping the policy direction and operations of the Lebanese intelligence services, following a doctrine of "absolute security".

He developed a close professional relationship with Fouad Chehab, which significantly shaped his career. Despite his success, the legacy of his methods remained controversial, with some linking it to increased tensions that contributed to Lebanon’s Civil War.

== Military career ==
Saad was active in various military sectors during his service. He joined the Lebanese Army in 1930. He served as commander of the second Sniper Regiment (successor to the Levantine Regiment) from 1948 to 1950.

== Personal life ==
He was married to Barsita Mikhael Saad (born 1926). Together they had six children: Bassam, retired Brigadier General; Hanna, a Business Engineer; Samir, who died at a young age due to malpractice; Elias, a Civil Engineer, Noha; an Endocrinologist; Rita, who died in her early twenties after losing a battle with brain cancer; and Fouad, an Industrial Engineer.

== Retirement ==
Antoun Saad left the Second Bureau when President Chehab's term of office ended and was appointed commander of the Mount Lebanon Military Region on August 27, 1964, retiring July 1, 1971. He carried many secrets into retirement, and when the Civil War broke out and his asthma worsened, he burned all classified documents. He died on 26 June 1977 at the age of 67.

== See also ==
- Second Bureau (Lebanon)
- Fouad Chehab
- Camille Chamoun
- Lebanon’s Civil War
- 1961 Lebanese coup attempt
- 1958 Lebanon crisis

== Bibliography ==
- ناصيف, نقولا (2006). حاكم في الظل. Lebanon. p. 701.
- ناصيف, نقولا (2011). جمهورية فؤاد شهاب. Lebanon. p. 610.
