= Saadi Al Munla =

Lebanese politician (1890–1975)

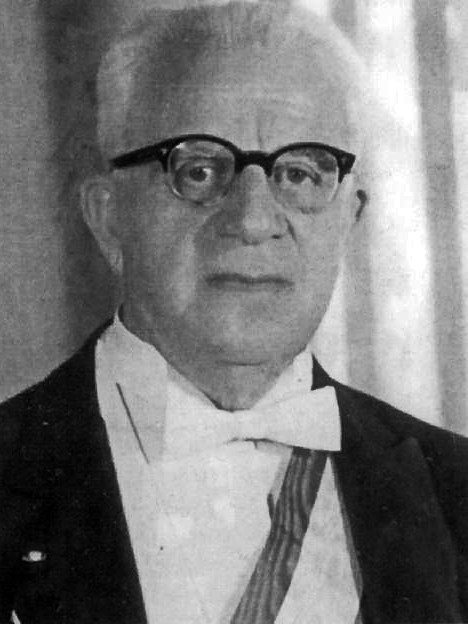
- Munla in 1946

Prime Minister of Lebanon
- In office 22 May 1946 – 14 December 1946
- President: Bishara Al Khouri
- Preceded by: Sami Al Solh
- Succeeded by: Riad Al Solh

Minister of Economy
- In office 22 May 1946 – 14 December 1946
- President: Bishara Al Khouri

Personal details
- Born: 4 November 1890 Tripoli, Ottoman Empire
- Died: 12 December 1975 (aged 85)

Saadi Al Munla (Arabic: سعدي المنلا; 4 November 1890 – 12 December 1975) was a Lebanese politician and one of the former Lebanese prime ministers. He also served as minister of economy.

== Early life and education ==
Munla was a member of a Sunni family based in Tripoli. He was born there on 4 November 1890. He received a law degree.

== Career and activities ==
Munla was a lawyer by profession. He was a protégé of Rashid Karami and a member of the Independence Party headed by Abdul Hamid Karami. He then became a member of the Lebanese parliament. In 1945 he was appointed minister to the cabinet led by Prime Minister Sami Solh. Munla and two other cabinet members who were also the member of the Independence Party, Ahmed Asad and Jamil Talhouk, resigned from office in May 1946. Munla was appointed prime minister on 22 May 1946 under President Bishara Khoury replacing Sami Solh in the post. Munla was in the office until 14 December 1946, and Riad Solh succeeded him as prime minister. During his premiership Munla also assumed the position of economy minister. He died in December 1975.

Political offices
Preceded by Sami Solh	Prime Minister of Lebanon; 1946	Succeeded by Riad Solh
