= Abdallah El-Yafi =

Lebanese politician (1901–1986)

- عبد الله اليافي
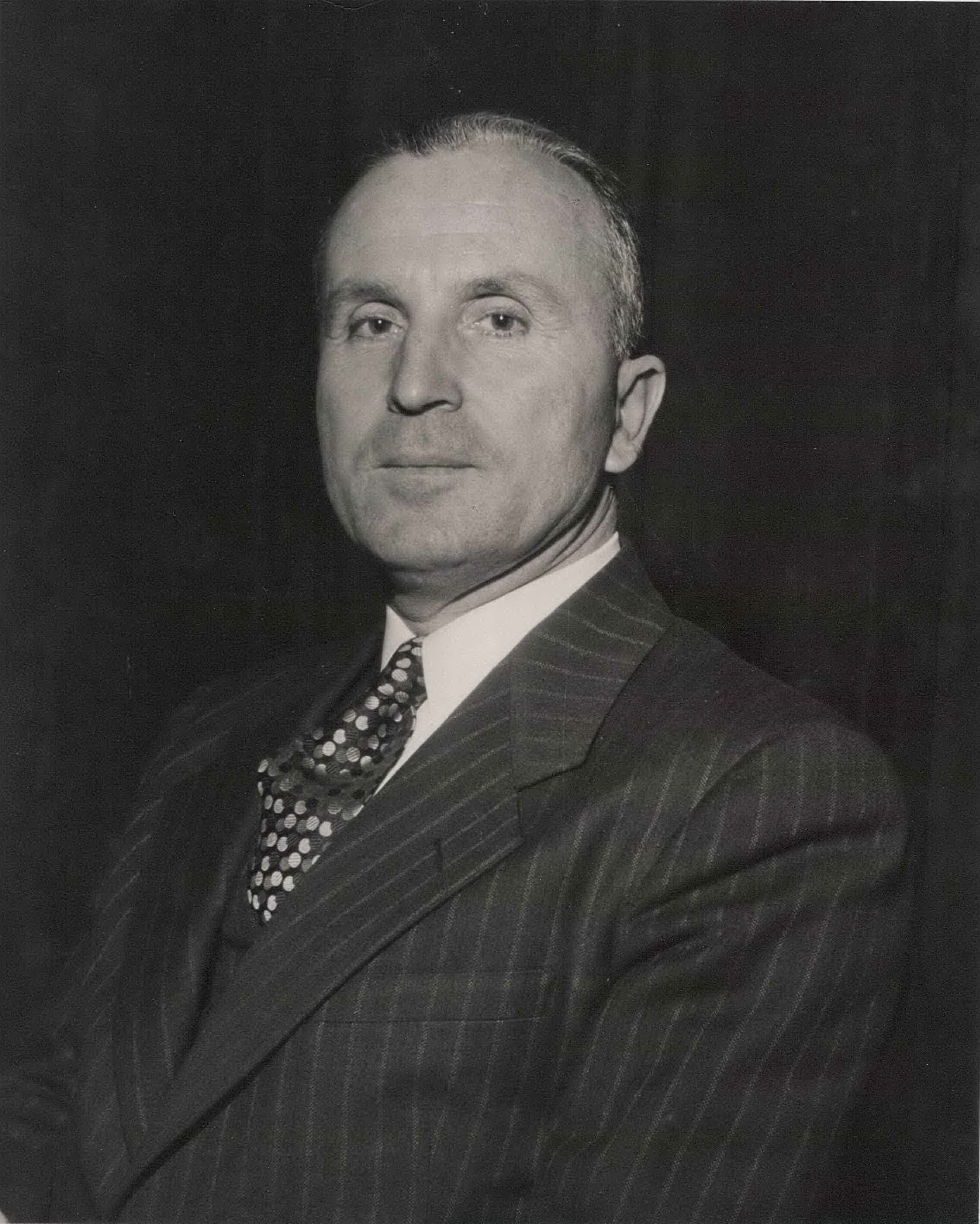

6th Prime Minister of Lebanon
- In office 24 October 1938 – 21 September 1939
- President: Émile Eddé
- Preceded by: Khaled Chehab
- Succeeded by: Abdullah Beyhum
- In office 7 April 1951 – 11 February 1952
- President: Bechara El Khoury
- Preceded by: Hussein Al Oweini
- Succeeded by: Sami Solh
- In office 24 September 1952 – 30 September 1952
- President: Camille Chamoun
- Preceded by: Saeb Salam
- Succeeded by: Khaled Chehab
- In office 16 August 1953 – 16 September 1954
- President: Camille Chamoun
- Preceded by: Saeb Salam
- Succeeded by: Sami Solh
- In office 20 March 1956 – 16 November 1958
- President: Camille Chamoun
- Preceded by: Rachid Karami
- Succeeded by: Sami Solh
- In office 9 April 1966 – 2 December 1966
- President: Charles Helou
- Preceded by: Rachid Karami
- Succeeded by: Rachid Karami
- In office 8 February 1968 – 15 January 1969
- President: Charles Helou
- Preceded by: Rachid Karami
- Succeeded by: Rachid Karami

Personal details
- Born: 7 September 1901 Beirut, Ottoman Lebanon
- Died: 4 November 1986 (aged 85) Beirut, Lebanon
- Party: Independent
- Spouse: Hind El-Azm
- Occupation: Lawyer
- Religion: Sunni Islam

Abdallah El-Yafi (Arabic: عبد الله اليافي, also transliterated as Abdallah Yafi, Abdallah Bey Aref el-Yafi and other variants; 7 September 1901 – 4 November 1986) was the prime minister of Lebanon serving twelve times between 1938 and 1969.

El-Yafi is considered to be one of the most popular politicians in Lebanese 20th century history. His ethical behavior in public service is cited as an example in the official civic education high-school textbooks as well as in the graduation of law students.

El-Yafi was considered one of the principle instigators of the collapse of Intra Bank in the 1960s. He was refused a personal loan by founder Yousef Beidas and the decision not to intervene was to have drastically averse collateral impact on Lebanon's other banks, as local depositors withdrew their money to open up accounts in US banks. In addition, El-Yafi was forced to resign.

He was at the forefront of the struggle to give women the right to vote, which was achieved during the prime ministry of Khaled Chehab in 1952.

== Early life and education ==
Abdallah El-Yafi was born in Beirut, Ottoman Lebanon on 7 September 1901 into a Sunni Muslim family to parents Aref El-Yafi and Jamila Ostwani.

Raised with two brothers, he first attended Sheikh Abbas School, a Muslim elementary school, then "Pères Jésuites" (Jesuit Fathers), a Roman Catholic school, and went on to earn his French Baccalaureate Degree. He pursued his advanced studies in law at the "Pères Jésuites" and earned a Juris Doctor.

In 1923, Abdallah El-Yafi enrolled in a PhD program at La Sorbonne University in Paris, France from which he graduated in 1926.

El-Yafi's political involvement lasted throughout his school years. He was President of the Arab Students Association, (French: Président de l'Association des étudiants Arabes) and was militating in France against the French Mandate which was then in place in Lebanon. He was known for organizing political demonstrations and giving fiery speeches, which once led to his arrest by the French Authorities only to be released a couple of days later.

Abdallah El-Yafi is the first Arab to receive a PhD from the Sorbonne University, where he wrote his thesis about women's rights in Islam. The thesis subject was "The Legal Status of Women in the Law of Islam" (French: La Condition Privée de la Femme dans le Droit de l'Islam). Drawing from Quranic decrees and Islamic principles, he made a case about how women are supposed to be allotted more rights in society.

Abdallah El-Yafi was known to be a man of strong and correct principles, who believed that the empowerment of women was crucial for building a stronger society, equality providing a steadier base. These thoughts, when expressed in the 1920s, had quite an 'avant-garde' ring to conservative Muslim ears: they were not always welcome with wide open arms or minds. Later on in his political life, Abdallah El-Yafi's political opponents brandished his thesis as a weapon of defamation to tarnish his reputation. According to them, he was not a "righteous Muslim" but a French minion who had given in to the French authorities—the colonial mandate authority in Lebanon at the time—in blaspheming the Islamic religion in reward of a "Doctorat d’État". These were aimed at ruining the honest image that he so carefully cultivated throughout his life.

== Personal life ==
On 1 August 1937, in Damascus, Abdallah El-Yafi married Hind El-Azm, a Damascene from one of the most prominent political families in Syria. Her uncle was Prime Minister of Syria Jamil Mardam Bey. They have five children.

== Political career ==
In 1933, for the first time, Abdallah El-Yafi ran for parliamentary elections in Beirut. He waded through the process because a good friend of his, Khayreddin al-Ahdab, was aiming for the same position. As the tension rose, Abdallah El-Yafi decided to step down famously stating "I will not sacrifice my friend for a parliamentary position".

Abdallah El-Yafi eventually went on to become Prime Minister of Lebanon twelve times. He was appointed prime minister in the government of every Lebanese president with the exception of Fouad Chehab because Abdallah El-Yafi was opposed to the idea of appointing a military general to the post of president.

In 1947, Abdallah El-Yafi was appointed, alongside future president of the Republic Camille Chamoun, to the Lebanese delegation to the UN that voted against the division of Palestine.

In the aftermath of the Suez Crisis, Yafi pressured President Chamoun to officially sever ties with France and Grand Britain in alignment with Egyptian president Gamal Abdel Nasser's demands. He resigned along with oil minister Saeb Salam on 16 November 1958 in protest against Chamoun's refusal to do so. Later during the 1958 Lebanon Crisis, Yafi joined ranks with Saeb Salam, Kamal Jumblatt, and Rashid Karami in support of Arab nationalist rebels fighting to dissolve Lebanon into Gamal Abdel Nasser's United Arab Republic.

He was appointed again as prime minister by Charles Helou in 1966, but was forced to resign once again in the wake of the Intra Bank scandal.

The last term he served as prime minister was in 1969. In 1974, President of Lebanon Suleiman Frangieh asked Abdallah El-Yafi to be the prime minister, he refused.

El-Yafi was the Minister of Finance four times: in 1954, 1966, 1968 and from 1968 to 1969. He was Defense Minister 1953-1954 and in 1968.

=== Women's suffrage in Lebanon ===
The struggle to achieve equal rights for women was one of Abdallah El-Yafi's principal political goals. In fact, Abdallah El-Yafi was the main politician who lobbied for women's suffrage in Lebanon. Despite a growing voice of dissent among his political adversaries, El-Yafi was able to extend the ballot to women during one of his terms. In 1952, the cabinet of Abdallah El-Yafi voted for a new policy that allowed voting rights to women with an elementary education and a minimum voting age of 21.

The law came in effect for the 1953 8th Parliamentary elections and is still in effect today.

=== Integrity ===
In the civic education classes in Lebanese schools, students are taught a lesson on honesty and honor through the story of Abdallah El-Yafi whose integrity was constantly cited as an example for all young people in Lebanon:

Abdallah El-Yafi was a young lawyer in October 1938, when then Lebanese President Emile Edde asked him to form a new government. During his tenure, he closed his law cabinet because he wanted to separate public services from private services. But after just 8 months in office, he decided to resign over a governmental policy dispute.

In the morning following his resignation, he woke up much earlier than usual and sat on the balcony meditating. His wife tried to console him for losing his premiership position. He famously replied: "I’m not worried about the premiership, but I’m worried about how to announce to you that I will have to cancel our telephone subscription for lack of money in my possession given the fact that my law firm has been closed for eight months and I am without clients." He is famous for having once said to a man who asked him to join a prolific business project "I would never even dare give the chance to the smallest villager in the most remote town to even think that I made a benefit of one penny".

Another story relates how a relative of his wife wanted Abdallah El-Yafi to grant him a license to build a tunnel in Dahr al-Baydar, an area in Mount Lebanon promising him a worthy profit. Abdallah El-Yafi told his wife "You either throw him out of my house now, or I will throw him down the stairs myself".

=== Death ===
Abdallah El-Yafi was diagnosed with Alzheimer's disease at an old age. He died in Beirut, in his home, on 4 November 1986.

Political offices
Preceded by Khaled Chehab	Prime Minister of Lebanon; 1938-1939	Succeeded by Abdallah Beyhum
Preceded by Hussein Al Oweini	Prime Minister of Lebanon; 1951-1952	Succeeded by Sami Solh
Preceded by Saeb Salam	Prime Minister of Lebanon; 1952	Succeeded by Khaled Chehab
Preceded by Saeb Salam	Prime Minister of Lebanon; 1953-1954	Succeeded by Khaled Chehab
Preceded by Rachid Karami	Prime Minister of Lebanon; 1956	Succeeded by Sami Solh
Preceded by Rachid Karami	Prime Minister of Lebanon; 1966	Succeeded by Rachid Karami
Preceded by Rachid Karami	Prime Minister of Lebanon; 1968-1969	Succeeded by Rachid Karami
