= Jihad Azour =

Lebanese economist and politician

- جهاد أزعور
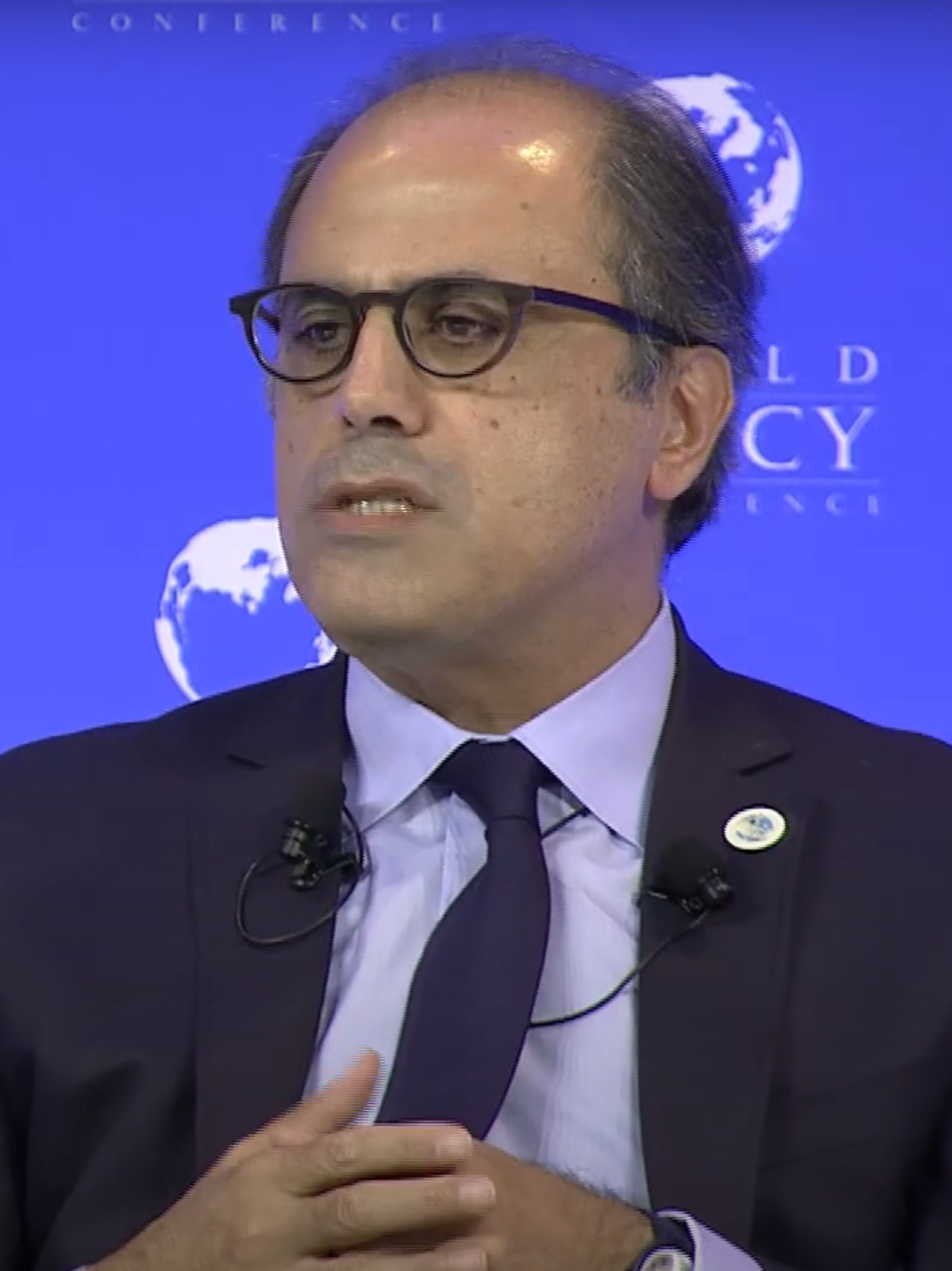
- Jihad Azour in 2017

Minister of Finance
- In office 19 July 2005 – 11 July 2008
- Prime Minister: Fouad Saniora
- Preceded by: Damianos Kattar
- Succeeded by: Mohamad Chatah

Personal details
- Born: 4 May 1966 (age 60) Byblos, Lebanon
- Spouse: Rola Rizk Azour
- Children: Jad Azour, Karim Azour
- Education: Institut d'Etudes Politiques de Paris Paris Dauphine University

Jihad Azour (Arabic: جهاد أزعور; born 4 May 1966) is a Lebanese economist and politician who served as Lebanon's minister of finance under Fouad Saniora's government from 2005 to 2008. He was a candidate for the 2022–2025 Lebanese presidential election. Jihad Azour is a Chevalier dans l’Ordre National de la Légion d'honneur. Azour is an academic writer, speaker and teacher.

== Education ==
Azour obtained his PhD with high honors in international finance from the Institut d'Etudes Politiques de Paris in France in 1996. While completing his PhD, he served as a postdoctoral fellow at Harvard University's Department of Economics researching the integration of emerging economies in the global economy. Azour also holds a post-graduate degree in international economics and finance (with honors), as well as a Master's degree in applied economics from the Paris Dauphine University. His masters thesis was awarded the best student research in 1987 by INSEE (the French National Institute for Statistics and Economic Studies).

== Career ==
In the private sector, he has held executive positions in private companies such as Inventis Corp, a Beirut business consultancy firm which he founded in 2011; Booz & Company (now Strategy&) the strategy consulting business unit of PricewaterhouseCoopers (PwC); and AM&F Consulting where he was a managing partner from 1996 - 1998. Azour has been a member of the board of directors of Compagnie Maritime d'Affrètement Compagnie Générale Maritime (CMA/CGM); Carnegie Middle East Advisory Council; Lebanese American University; and Iktissad Wal Aamal Group. Azour was a consultant to McKinsey and Company (1989–1993),Compagnie de Saint-Gobain. In 2014, Azour became a member of the investment committee of the Berytech VC Fund, a Beirut based venture capital fund.

He has been associated with initiatives including Mobile Innovation Hub (chairman); MiHub, a joint program with the World Bank Group to promote startups and technology sector in Lebanon; and BADER (the Young Lebanese Entrepreneurs Program). and the Youth Economic Forum. In 2003, Azour joined La Fassad, the Lebanese chapter of Transparency International, a non-profit, non-governmental anti-corruption organisation. He is also the founding member of the Lebanon chapter of the Young Arab Leaders.

In 2005, Azour was advisor to the International Monetary Fund's department of fiscal affairs on reforming Qatar's tax structure.

Azour's career at the Lebanon Ministry of Finance, began as a project director on a 1999 United Nations Development Programme (UNDP) Project. Between 2000 and 2004, he was senior advisor to the Minister of Finance with Georges Corm and then Fouad Siniora. It was during this time that the Value Added Tax was introduced.

Azour taught courses at the American University of Beirut including "Macroeconomic management in Lebanon" (2004), and on "Modern Commercial Banks' Management" (1998–2000). In 2012, Azour became a member of the board of international advisors of the university. In 2014, he became chairman of board.

=== Minister of Finance (2005–2008) ===
As Minister of Finance, Azour oversaw administrative and fiscal management reform including development of a function-based structure, containing government debt, streamlining trade and customs procedures through dialogue with private sector entities, modernizing cadastral operations, improving donor coordination by convening quarterly meetings, building capacity and human resources and upgrading and automating IT infrastructure.

This work was presented at the International Conference for Support to Lebanon-Paris III. This resulted in pledges of assistance of US$7.6 billion from the international community.

During Azour's term, for the first time, the fiscal accounts of the Lebanese government for the period 1993 - 2006 were audited and published. Azour also oversaw the publication of pertinent reports including a quarterly report on the status of the pledges made at the Paris III conference, on the use of funds, and on the progress made to the economic and social reform program.

Azour managed a liability and external borrowing program through international capital markets. He led an effort to modernize Lebanese capital markets through the listing more than 12 Eurobonds issued by the Lebanese Republic on the Beirut Stock Exchange.

In 2007, the Ministry of Finance was awarded a United Nations Public Service award in the category "Improving the Delivery of Services" for improvement in taxation systems and the introduction of Value-added tax (VAT).

=== International Monetary Fund ===
From 2006 to 2008, Azour chaired the G8-MENA Ministerial Group which regroups ministers of finance and central bank governors of the G8 and MENA countries. In 2009, Azour became a member of the International Monetary Fund (IMF)'s Middle East Advisory Group (MEAG). In 2012, he was appointed to a World Bank independent panel of experts.

In 2016, IMF Managing Director, Christine Lagarde, appointed Azour the IMF Director of the Middle East and Central Asia department; he assumed the position on 1 March 2017.

Azour is the Director of the Middle East and Central Asia Department at the International Monetary Fund where he oversees the Fund’s work in the Middle East, North Africa, Central Asia and Caucasus.

=== 2023 Presidential candidacy ===
In the wake of the 2020 Beirut explosion, Lebanon president, Michel Aoun left office prior to his term finishing in October 2022. Eleven electoral sessions of the members of parliament failed to provide a successor. The speaker of parliament, Nabih Berri did not call a twelfth session without clear indication of success. In late May 2023, the Maronite Patriarch Bechara Boutros al-Rahi, the Christian-based political party, the Lebanese Forces, the Kataeb, the Free Patriotic Movement (FPM) and the PSP endorsed Azour. Azour temporarily suspended his duties at the IMF to focus on his candidacy for the Lebanese presidency. The twelfth session to elect a president was held on 14 June 2023. Azour received 60 votes, not reaching the two-thirds majority required for election to the presidency.

== Publications ==
Azour's publications include:

§ In French:

- "Délits d'Initiés en Europe", Le Monde Editions (1994), in collaboration with Mss C. Ducouloux-Favard (Lawyer, Professor in University of Paris IX-Dauphine), Book on insider trading in Europe.
- "Déontologie et Droit des Activités Financières", Le Monde Editions (1994), in collaboration with Ms A. Pezard (Judge, Advisor of the Director of Treasury), Book on ethics and regulations in finance.
- "Rapport sur l'Argent dans le Monde- 1995 and 1996", editor and contributor, REF Editions.

§ In English:

- "Fighting Money Laundering", Booklet for the Lebanese Banking Association (June 1997).
- "Fiduciary Operations: Legal, Economic, Financial, Regulatory, and Tax aspects", Book co-author, Banque du Liban (1999).
- "Linking Economic Growth and Social Development in Lebanon", Report co-author, UNDP (2000).
- Numerous articles and research papers on financial issues in different publications including: Revue Banque, Revue d'Economie Financière, Le Monde, Marchés et techniques financières, Emerging Lebanon – Oxford Business Group, the Daily Star, Le Commerce du Levant, An-Nahar.

== Personal life ==
Azour is a member of the Eastern Catholic Maronite church. He is married to Rola Rizk. They have two sons, Jad and Karim Azour. Azour is the nephew of the late minister and member of parliament, Jean Obeid.
