= 1961 Lebanese coup attempt =

1961 coup d'état attempt in Lebanon

Date	December 31, 1961
Location	Lebanon
Result	Lebanese Government victory; Coup attempt fails

Belligerents
Lebanese Government; Lebanese Armed Forces	SSNP-L

Commanders and leaders
Fouad Chehab; Antoine Saad	Chawki Khairallah; Fouad Awad; Abdullah Saadeh

Units involved
Lebanese Armed Forces; (Lebanon) Second Bureau	200 civilian supporters; Multiple SSNP operatives; Lebanese Armed Forces defectors loyal to the SSNP

The 1961 Lebanese coup d'état attempt was a suppressed coup attempt in Lebanon by the Syrian Social Nationalist Party (SSNP-L) on New Year's Eve. On the last day of 1961, two SSNP-L members, company commanders in the Lebanese army, led an unsuccessful attempted lightning coup against President Fouad Chehab, supported by some 200 civilian SSNP members. In the scholarly literature, the coup has been explained as stemming from the party's ideological preference for violence ("bullets over ballots"), its frustration at exclusion from the Lebanese state, and both political and military criticism of the rule of Fouad Chehab.

This resulted in a renewed proscription and the imprisonment of many of its leaders. Most of the party's known activists remained in prison or exile until a general amnesty in 1969. In 1969, the party re-aligned towards Arab nationalism.

== Operation ==
=== Planning ===
The entire coup was predicated on a poorly coordinated plan with conflicting orders. Because many officers would be off duty or on holiday leave on New Year's Eve, it was chosen as the optimal date of choice to execute.

The plan involved seizing control of the Ministry of National Defense and detaining Fouad Chehab. Armed civilian squads composed of SSNP-L comrades scattered out across Beirut to link up with military rebel units which included the support of around 200 civilian SSNP members. The attempt was headed by Chawki Khairallah, Fouad Awad and Abdullah Saadeh, father of current politician Salim Saadeh.

== Aftermath ==
Advisors of Chehab who allegedly witnessed armed SSNP-L partisans gathering around the central areas of Beirut rushed to the presidential palace to inform Chehab of the insurrection. This resulted in a renewed proscription and the imprisonment and/or execution of many SSNP-L leaders. Most of the party's known activists remained in prison or exile until a general amnesty in 1969. In 1969, the party re-aligned towards Arab nationalism.

The Medal of 31 December 1961 was awarded to all members of the Lebanese Armed Forces who participated in the suppression of the SSNP-L coup attempt.
