= Lebanese Military Museum =

Military museum in Yarze, Lebanon

- Lebanese Military Museum
- Established: 1974
- Location: Yarze, Baabda District
- Coordinates: 33.833333°N 35.533333°E
- Type: Military Museum
- Website: http://www.lebarmy.gov.lb

The Lebanese Military Museum (Arabic: المتحف العسكري Al Mathaf al-askari) is part of the Lebanese Armed Forces and dedicated for the preservation of old Lebanese military antiques. The museum is currently located at the Ministry of National Defense, in Yarze.

== History ==
The idea of establishing a military museum dedicated to the Lebanese Army emerged during the post-independence period, after the Lebanese authorities had supported the Lebanese military units, who were formerly enlisted in the French Army. Following the evacuation of foreign troops stationed in Lebanon (August 1, 1945), the Army Command ordered, in 1974, the establishment of a committee responsible for documenting the history of the Lebanese army and the preservation of its heritage.

Since 1948, the Army Command began the collection and storage of old equipment, weapons and military uniforms. A year later, contacts between the Army Command and the directorate of antiques (of the Ministry of Education) enabled the Army Command forward the idea of establishing a military museum, with a view of assembling the military history in its possession. The proposal won approval and support of the Director of antiques, Emir Maurice Chehab. Thus, contacts were established between the parties concerned, namely the directorate of the antiques at the Ministry of Interior and the municipality of Beirut through the Ministry of Education to assign an area of 2600 m^{2} south of the current museum in the eastern part of Beirut racetrack. The new building, which was to be attached to the National Museum, was called "The Museum of the Middle Ages and the Army" and exhibited medieval and contemporary objects.

Contacts continued in the 1950s and early 1960s, until the Council of Ministers approved the construction of the museum, and entrusted the implementation of construction projects, in agreement with the Ministry of National Defense and the Ministry of Education. As a result of numerous studies, construction began in the summer of 1968 and the structure was built with funds allocated to the museum (£L1,000,000). The work was interrupted a year later due to necessary appropriations for the Department of National Defense. In the 1970s, the site became under the stewardship of the Directorate General of the ruins.

In 1977, the building was leased to the Lebanese University, by a decision from the council of ministers, to become the seat of the rector and the university administration (until 1998). In that year, a new building was built near the Ministry of National Defense in Yarzeh, however, the limited size of the building did not permit the storage of all the old equipment, military uniforms and others. Some of the content remained stored at the Museum of Fayadieh military school, and the rest in the fortress of Rashaya in the region of West Beqaa, while being connected to the main military museum in the Ministry of National Defense. Finally, the military museum was annexed to the directorate of orientation and regarded as one of its departments.

== Stored material ==
The old weapons constitute a major element in the museum, with swords and axes hanging on the walls. In addition the place includes old pistols, photos and paintings, with some dating back to the Ottoman rule. The copy of the original bronze icon "Qana, the celebration of martyrdom", designed by the artist Michel Sakr who later enrolled in the LAF. The icon was depicted shortly after the Israeli bombing of Qana, commemorating the martyrs who were killed during the April War of 1996. It was inaugurated in Byblos, then transferred to the Parliament where it was fixed and given "the shield of Qana".

In addition, the museum preserve a historic petition, carved on wood and signed by 41 Lebanese officers following the proposal of Captain Jamil Lahoud, declaring the sole service under the Lebanese national flag. This petition was made after the division of the French army in 1941, and the participation of units of the Free French Forces under the command of General Charles de Gaulle in war against Germany and Italy. This has let, in the summer of 1941, the joint forces of the Free French and British forces to attack the Vichy French troops positioned in Syria and Lebanon, through Palestine. French forces stationed in Syria have resisted against the invasion of the allies, with the participation of Lebanese and Syrian forces that were subject to this command at the time. This arrangement has prompted the Lebanese opposition of officers, heads of Lebanese gunmen, who considered that Lebanon should not interfere in disputes between the parties, and that the soldiers should defend their borders against any enemy.

Other texts, in the museum, include among them the text on the Battle of Malkieh when Lebanese, Syrian and Iraqi, with Yugoslav volunteers drove Israeli forces from the town of Malkieh on May 16, 1948. Similarly, the museum includes gifts, shields, certificates of appreciation offered to the Lebanese army, and other.

== Location ==
Located near the main entrance of the Ministry of National Defense in Yarze, the museum is marked by a landmark, a tower of beige concrete and weaponry. Designed and gifted to Lebanon in 1995 by an artist called Arman, on the accompanying plaque, the imposing monument, with over a score of tank barrels protruding from its side, is entitled Hope for Peace. Just opposite stands the statue of the immortal, which was inaugurated on 22 November 1996, in memory of the LAF martyrs, and a plaque positioned on the museum's forecourt with the inscription "The Military Museum-Yarze" (prepared on 9 October 1998, under the patronage of General Émile Lahoud, the former commander of the army). The oval building includes 2 rooms with several levels and a lower lounge.

== See also ==
- Ministry of National Defense
- List of museums in Lebanon
