= List of awards and nominations received by Fairuz =

List of awards and recognitions awarded to the Lebanese singer Fairuz.

== 1957 ==
- Cavalier Order Medal of Honour, awarded by Lebanese President Camille Chamoun.

== 1962 ==
- Order of Merit, awarded by Lebanese President Fouad Chehab.

== 1963 ==
- Medal of Honour, awarded by King Hussein of Jordan.
- Order of Cedars, awarded by Lebanese President Fouad Chehab;

== 1967 ==
- Order of Merit First Class, awarded by Syrian President Nureddin al-Atassi.

== 1968 ==
- Key to the Holy City, awarded by Jerusalem Cultural Committee.

== 1969 ==
- Memorial Lebanese Stamp, issued by the Lebanese Government.

== 1970 ==
- Legion of Honour, awarded by Lebanese President Suleiman Frangieh.

== 1975 ==
- Gold Medal of Honour, awarded by King Hussein of Jordan.

== 1988 ==
- Commandeur des Arts et des Lettres, awarded by French President François Mitterrand

== 1997 ==
- Highest Artistic Distinction, awarded by Tunisian President Zine El Abidine Ben Ali
- Jerusalem Award, awarded by the Jerusalem Culture and Arts Committee.

== 1998 ==
- Chevalier de la Légion d'honneur, awarded by French President Jacques Chirac
- Highest Distinction, awarded by King Hussein of Jordan

== 2005 ==
- Honorary Doctorate from the American University of Beirut
