= Yarze =

Yarze يرزة
- Town
- Location within Lebanon
- Coordinates: 33°50′30″N 35°32′22″E
- Country: Lebanon
- Governorate: Mount Lebanon Governorate
- District: Baabda District
- Highest elevation: 400 m (1,300 ft)
- Lowest elevation: 300 m (980 ft)
- Time zone: UTC+2 (EET)
  - Summer (DST): UTC+3 (EEST)
- Dialing code: +961

Yarze (Arabic: يرزة) is a town in Baabda District southeast of Beirut in Lebanon.

The headquarters of the Lebanese Ministry of Defense is located in Yarze. This facility includes the Lebanese Military Museum.

In October 1990, following General Michel Aoun’s defeat in his ill-fated War of Liberation (1989–1990), the Syrian army took over the Ministry of Defence building in Yarze and removed all the Deuxiceme Bureau (Military Intelligence) files.

The city also has the famous Hope for Peace Monument designed and gifted to Lebanon in 1995 by Arman which was specially commissioned by the Lebanese government to commemorate 50 years of their military's service.
