= Mohamad Chatah =

Lebanese economist and diplomat

Mohammad Chatah
- محمد شطح
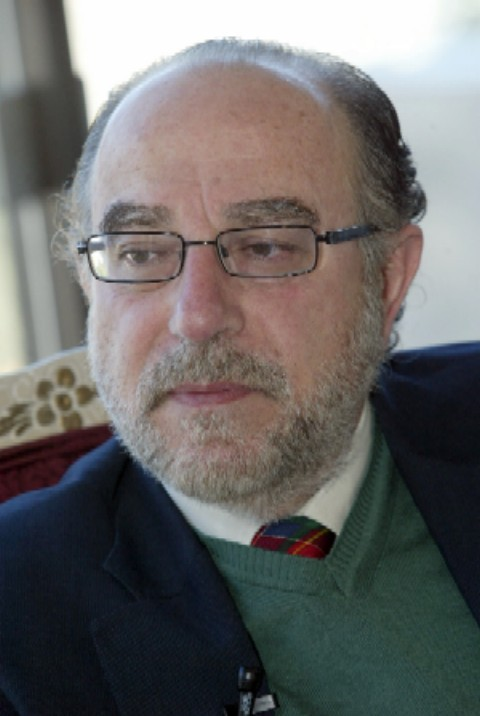

Minister of Finance
- In office 11 July 2008 – 9 November 2009
- Prime Minister: Fouad Siniora
- Preceded by: Jihad Azour
- Succeeded by: Raya Haffar al-Hassan

Personal details
- Born: Mohammad Bahaa Chatah; 7 March 1951 Tripoli, Lebanon
- Died: 27 December 2013 (aged 62) Beirut
- Cause of death: Assassination
- Party: Future Movement
- Children: Ronnie Chatah; Omar Chatah
- Education: American University in Beirut; University of Texas
- Website: Chatah blog

Mohammad Chatah (Arabic: محمد شطح; 7 March 1951 – 27 December 2013) was a Lebanese economist and diplomat.

== Biography ==
Chatah was born in Tripoli, Lebanon. He studied economics at the American University in Beirut and earned a doctorate at the University of Texas in the United States. Then he taught economics at his alma mater, University of Texas.

In 1983 he secured a position with the International Monetary Fund as the deputy to the Executive Director, Dr. Mohamed Finaish. He served as Ambassador to the U.S. from 1997 to 2000. He returned to the IMF in 2001 and stayed until June 2005. Chatah's resignation from the IMF in 2005 coincided with the assassination of former Prime Minister Rafiq Hariri on 14 February 2005; he returned to Lebanon as a senior adviser to the newly elected Prime Minister Fouad Siniora in August 2005 and served in the post until July 2008. During the July 2006 war, Chatah appeared on numerous Western news outlets as a public spokesman for the Lebanese government. When asked about the government's role in disarming local armed groups, Chatah said "we are doing it [through] dialogue and persuasion, and trying to reach a point where the state is the sole holder of weapons and the one with the only authority throughout our territory." He also served as vice-governor of the Central Bank of Lebanon.

Chatah was named the Minister of Finance of the 70th Lebanese government in July 2008 and held the position to November 2009. He served as foreign policy adviser to Prime Minister Saad Hariri from November 2009 to January 2011. He was affiliated with the Hariri Future Movement, a Sunni political group, although he officially remained an independent figure in national politics.

== Assassination and reactions ==
At approximately 9:40am on 27 December 2013, a car bomb struck Chatah's convoy in the Central District of Beirut, Lebanon. The bombing killed a total of eight people, among them Chatah, and injured seventy others. The bomb "was estimated to weigh more than 50 kilograms and was placed inside a stolen Honda car." The attack has been described as a political assassination of Chatah. Later this bombing along with other political assassinations were linked to Unit 121, executing Hezbollah's policy.

The US President Barack Obama and the Secretary of State John Kerry condemned the assassination of Chatah and described it as a terrorist attack on 27 December.

== Publications ==
- Offshore gas belongs to the Lebanese, so let them see the money (Archived version)
- Mohamad Chatah's Blog

== See also ==
- List of assassinated Lebanese politicians
