= Hope for Peace Monument =

Monument in Yarze, Lebanon

Coordinates: 33°50′23″N 35°33′28″E

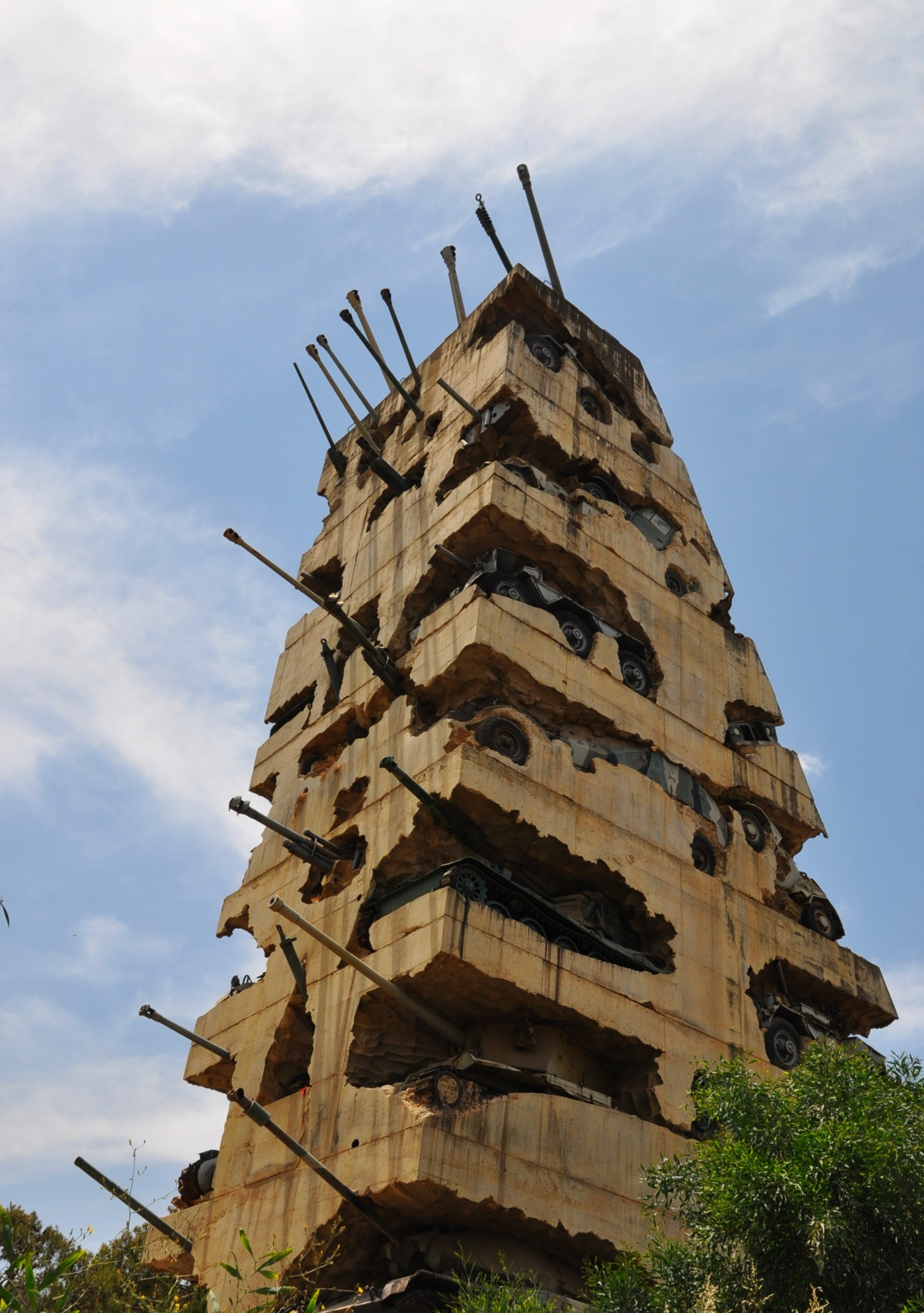

The Hope for Peace (Espoir de Paix) Monument is a monument in Yarze, Lebanon, made to celebrate the end of the Lebanese Civil War in 1990. It was designed by the French-born American artist Armand Fernandez. It is located near the Ministry of National Defence. It was built in 1995. It is the official monument to commemorate the end of the civil war in Lebanon.

The monument is unusual in that it contains 78 military vehicles, from a range of eras and nations. The monument resembles a bombed-out building, with the vehicles positioned in it. The guns of the tanks and military vehicles stick out of it, mostly pointing in one direction.

== Construction ==
The various tanks and military vehicles were donated for the project by the Lebanese government. In the building of the monument, the former military hardware were welded to a large metal frame-structure. Large sandbags and concrete were combined together and then poured into the tall frame to create the overall appearance of the monument. It is constructed from 5,000 tons of concrete and stands 30 metres high.

The tall memorial's range of decommissioned military vehicles comprises armoured personnel carriers (APCs), tanks, gun-trucks and self-propelled gun (SPG) vehicles, including Charioteer tank destroyers, Sherman Firefly, M-50 and M-51 Super Sherman, T-55 and M47 Patton tanks, as well as Saladin armoured cars, a BTR-152 wheeled APC, a Panhard armoured car, an AMX-13 tank and a Ferret armoured car.
