= Hussein Al Oweini =

Lebanese politician and businessman (1900–1971)

Hussein al-Oweini
- حسين العويني
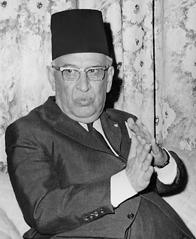

Prime Minister of Lebanon
- In office 20 February 1964 – 25 July 1965
- President: Fouad Chehab; Charles Helou
- Preceded by: Rashid Karami
- Succeeded by: Rashid Karami

Interim Prime Minister of Lebanon
- In office 14 February 1951 – 7 April 1951
- President: Bechara El Khoury
- Preceded by: Riad Al Solh
- Succeeded by: Abdullah Arif Yafi

Personal details
- Born: 24 December 1900 Beirut, Ottoman Empire
- Died: 11 January 1971 (aged 70) Beirut, Lebanon
- Spouse: Chafica Jaroudi

Hussein Al Oweini (Arabic: حسين العويني; 24 December 1900 – 11 January 1971) was a Lebanese businessman and politician who served as Prime Minister of Lebanon twice. He also held other cabinet positions.

== Early life ==
Oweini was born in 1900. He hailed from a Sunni family based in Beirut.

== Career ==
Oweini worked in Saudi Arabia as a business agent for the House of Saud from 1923 to 1947. He founded a company, Ne'ma Te'ma, in Riyadh. He had also business investments in Beirut and was one of the shareholders of Air Liban through the Busson Group. The other members of the Busson Group included Antoine Sahnawi, Michel Khattar, and Georges Karam. Oweini was also one of the owners of a local insurance company which was the representative of the French insurance company Union Nationale.

Oweini was the minister of finance from July 1948 to June 1951. He was first appointed interim prime minister on 14 February 1951 under President Bechara El Khoury succeeding Riad Al Solh in the post. Oweini was in office until 7 April 1951 and succeeded by Abdullah Yafi. In 1951 Oweini cofounded BLOM Bank in Lebanon.

On 27 September 1957, Oweini and two other former prime ministers, Saeb Salam and Abdallah El-Yafi, were arrested on charges of planning an armed coup and riots during the elections held in May. Oweini's second term as prime minister was from 20 February 1964 to 25 July 1965 under President Charles Helou. Both his predecessor and successor was Rashid Karami as prime minister. Oweini was the leader of the National Front. He also served as the minister of foreign affairs and emigrants for three separate terms, from 1958 to 1960, in 1965, and 1968 to 1969. During his third term as foreign minister, Oweini also acted as minister of national defense.

== Personal life and death ==
Oweini was married to Chafica Jaroudi. One of Oweini's daughters is Nada Oweini who is one of the shareholders of the BLOM Bank and the wife of Saudi-Lebanese businessman Ghassan Chaker.

Hussein Al Oweini died on 11 January 1971, aged 70. After his death, the Hussein Al Oweini Award was initiated in his honor.

Political offices
Preceded by Riad Solh	Prime Minister of Lebanon; 1951	Succeeded by Abdallah El Yafi
Preceded by Rashid Karami	Prime Minister of Lebanon; 1964–1965	Succeeded by Rashid Karami
