= Sami Solh =

Lebanese Sunni Muslim politician (1887–1968)

- سامي الصلح
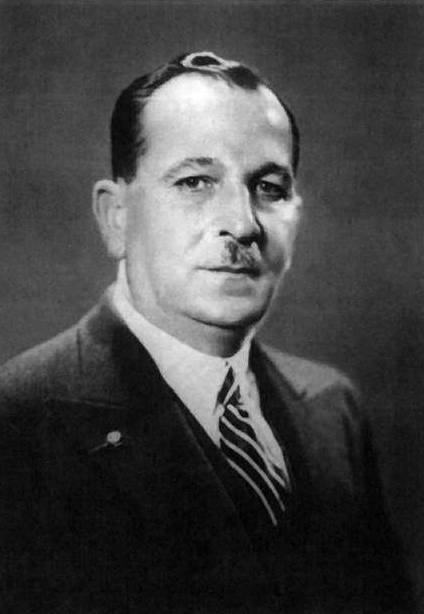

3rd Prime Minister of Lebanon
- In office 23 August 1945 – 22 May 1946
- President: Bishara Al Khouri
- Preceded by: Abdul Hamid Karami
- Succeeded by: Saadi Al Munla
- In office 11 February 1952 – 9 September 1952
- President: Bishara Al Khouri
- Preceded by: Abdallah El-Yafi
- Succeeded by: Nazem Akkari
- In office 16 September 1954 – 19 September 1955
- President: Camille Chamoun
- Preceded by: Abdallah El-Yafi
- Succeeded by: Rashid Karami
- In office 18 November 1956 – 20 September 1958
- President: Camille Chamoun
- Preceded by: Abdallah El-Yafi
- Succeeded by: Khalil al-Hibri

Minister of Defense
- In office 1 March 1957 – 18 August 1957
- Preceded by: Fouad Chehab
- Succeeded by: Majid Arslan
- In office 22 May 1958 – 24 September 1958
- Preceded by: Rashid Baydoun
- Succeeded by: Rashid Karami

Personal details
- Born: 7 May 1887 Ottoman Empire
- Died: 7 November 1968 (aged 81) Beirut, Lebanon
- Party: Constitutional Bloc (1934–1958); National Liberal Party (1958–1968)
- Spouse: Balqıs Rida Solh
- Religion: Sunni Islam

Sami (El) Solh (Arabic: سامي الصلح; 1887–1968) was a Lebanese Sunni Muslim politician. He was a relative of former Lebanese prime ministers Riad Solh, Takieddine Solh and Rachid Solh. He served as Prime Minister of Lebanon five times (1942–43, 1945–46, 1952, 1954–55, and 1956–58).

== Biography ==
Solh was born into a Sunni family in 1887. He grew up in Turkey, Greece, and Lebanon.

Solh survived many assassination attempts, two of which occurred on 20 April and 29 July 1958 while he was serving as the prime minister. He also held the portfolio of defense minister in 1957 and 1958.

Solh married Balqis Rida Solh, who was the sister of the Prime Minister Riad Solh. He spoke French, Arabic, Greek and Turkish.

== Honours ==
One of the most prominent avenues in Beirut, next to the Ministry of Justice, is named Boulevard Sami El Solh. In 2018, a Lebanese stamp was created dedicated to the prime minister.

- Knight Grand Cross of the Imperial Order of the Yoke and Arrows of Francoist Spain (1 April 1952)

Political offices
Preceded by Abdul Hamid Karami	Prime Minister of Lebanon; 1945–1946	Succeeded by Saadi Al Munla
Preceded by Abdallah El-Yafi	Prime Minister of Lebanon; 1952	Succeeded by Nazem Akkari
Preceded by Abdallah El-Yafi	Prime Minister of Lebanon; 1954–1955	Succeeded by Rashid Karami
Preceded by Abdallah El-Yafi	Prime Minister of Lebanon; 1956–1958	Succeeded by Khalil al-Hibri
