= Khalil al-Hibri =

Lebanese politician and businessman

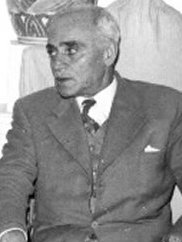
Khalil al-Hibri

Khalil al-Hibri (Arabic: خليل الهبري) was a Lebanese politician and businessman.

== Biography ==
Al-Hibri served in parliament in 1957 and as Minister of Public Works in the government of Sami el-Solh during the presidency of Camille Chamoun. In 1952, he joined the board of Beirut's Water Company in the Municipality of Beirut, and later became the chairman of the board until 1972. He was instrumental in the development and modernization of Beirut's water facilities. Hibri is best known for agreeing to head a transitional government during the Lebanon Crisis of 1958. He was followed by Rashid Karami who headed a government of national reconciliation.

== See also ==
- List of prime ministers of Lebanon

Preceded by Sami el-Solh	Prime Minister of Lebanon; 1958	Succeeded by Rashid Karami
