= 1958 Lebanon crisis =

Lebanese political crisis

- Part of the Cold War & Arab Cold War
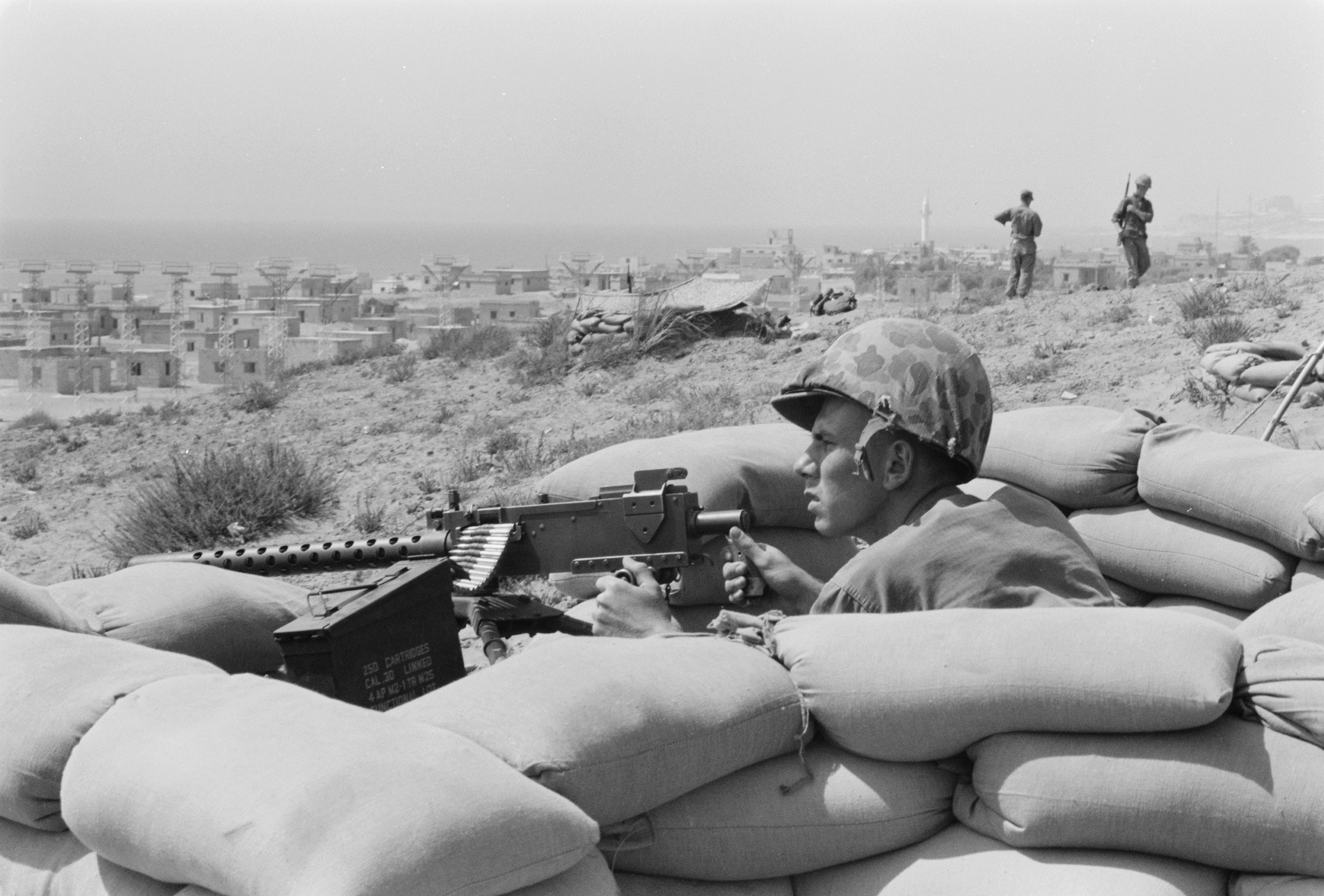
- American Marine in a foxhole outside Beirut
Date	10 May – 25 October 1958 (5 months, 2 weeks and 1 day)
Location	Lebanon (Mainly in Beirut)
Result	Inconclusive: Reconciliation government formed

Belligerents
Lebanese Government; Lebanese Army; United States (from 15 July); Pro-Government Factions: Kataeb Party; SSNP-L; ARF	Anti-Government Factions: Najjadeh Party; PSP; LCP; Al-Mourabitoun; Supported by: United Arab Republic

Commanders and leaders
Camille Chamoun; Naim Moghabghab; Sami Solh; Gen. Fouad Chehab; (United States) Dwight Eisenhower; Pierre Gemayel; Chawki Khairallah; Movses Kaloustian	Rashid Karami; Saeb Salam; Adnan Al-Hakim; Kamal Jumblatt; Farajallah Helou; Ibrahim Kulaylat

The 1958 Lebanon crisis was a political crisis in Lebanon caused by political and religious tensions in the country that included an American military intervention, which lasted for around three months until President Camille Chamoun, who had requested the assistance, completed his term as president of Lebanon. American and Lebanese government forces occupied the Port of Beirut and Beirut International Airport. With the crisis over, the United States withdrew.

== Background ==
=== Arab Cold War ===
After the end of World War II in 1945, the United States and Soviet Union were the two major world powers. Two years later, the Truman Doctrine was issued, aimed at containing the spread of communism and the Soviet Union. The Cold War is generally considered to have begun around this time. As the world divided into the Eastern (communist) and Western (capitalist) Blocs, a struggle for ideological geopolitical supremacy between the US and USSR emerged. One of the ways it manifested was through proxy wars in various global regions. One of those regions was the Middle East, where the Arab Cold War took place. After the Suez Crisis in 1956, there was an increase in Arab hostility to the West as well as increased Soviet influence in Egypt and Syria. The crisis also encouraged pan-Arabism and increased the popularity and influence of Gamal Abdel Nasser, President of Egypt. The United States feared that the region was susceptible to the spread of communism.

The Eisenhower Doctrine was announced by President of the United States Dwight D. Eisenhower in January 1957. It pledged American economic and military aid to prevent communism from spreading in the Middle East. The United States Congress passed the doctrine on 7 March and it was signed into law on 9 March. James P. Richards began to tour the Middle East and the Joint Chiefs of Staff and United States European Command began to make plans for intervention in the region. Their plan centered around the United States Sixth Fleet, stationed in the Mediterranean Sea, the Middle East Force and several Air Force units. 11,000 soldiers were made ready for combat in the region. While the doctrine was never formally invoked, the US supported Hussein of Jordan in 1957 against an alleged coup attempt and moved to prevent communism from spreading in Syria.

=== Situation in Lebanon ===
The partition of the Ottoman Empire divided present-day Lebanon under the Mandate for Syria and the Lebanon in 1923. Lebanon completely became an independent nation on 22 November 1943 when the French Mandate formally ended. Around the time of independence, the National Pact was agreed upon, stating that, among other things, Lebanon was to be a completely independent sovereign state. "The Christians were to forego seeking foreign [...] protection or attempting to bring Lebanon under foreign control or influence. In return, the Muslims were to forego making any attempt to bring Lebanon into any political union with Syria, or into the formation of any Arab Union". The Pact marked a compromise between several religious sects living in the country—namely Maronite Christians, Sunni Muslims, Shia Muslims, Greek Orthodox Christians, Greek Catholic Christians and Druzes.

Camille Chamoun was elected as the second President of Lebanon in the presidential elections in 1952, replacing Bechara El Khoury in the post. Described as "quite openly anti-Communist", the United States viewed Chamoun as "definitely our friend." In 1956, Prime Minister Abdallah El-Yafi and Minister of State Saeb Salam resigned in protest due to Chamoun's refusal to condemn the British-French invasion of Egypt during the Suez Crisis. This caused Muslim opposition groups to form the National Union Front in 1957. The United States agreed to provide military assistance to the Lebanese government from 6 June 1957.

In 1957, shortly after the announcement of the Eisenhower Doctrine—which Chamoun's regime had been the only Arab government to openly endorse "without reservation"—the United States became concerned that parliamentary elections set for June would result in the election of a parliament that was hostile to the US. Many Muslims in the nation supported Nasser and the United Arab Republic (UAR). Kamal Jumblatt and Rashid Karami, Druze and Sunni leaders, respectively, condemned Chamoun's support for the doctrine as violating the National Pact. US attempts to influence the election included approving the sending of $12.7 million in military or financial aid and sending operatives from the Central Intelligence Agency (including David Atlee Phillips, Miles Copeland Jr. and Wilbur Eveland) to the region, who provided "campaign contributions" towards pro-West politicians. In late May 1957 pro-Chamoun troops killed seven and wounded seventy-three protesters in Beirut. In the following month, opposition leaders argued that Chamoun "had bought so many votes and gerrymandered so many districts that the balloting would be meaningless." The election was an American success, as fifty-three out of sixty-six parliamentarians supported Chamoun. The US continued to provide aid to Chamoun, fearing Soviet and UAR influence in the region. Chamoun's opponents maintained that the election was invalid and needed to be re-held.

On 8 May 1958, a Lebanese journalist, Nasib Al Matni, was assassinated in his office in Beirut. He was a pro-Nasserist and anti-Chamoun Maronite. Following this incident intensive protests occurred in Beirut and Tripoli.

In 1958, Camille Chamoun was in the sixth and final year of his term as President of Lebanon.

=== Heightened tensions ===
On 1 February 1958, Syria and Egypt united, forming the UAR. The United States feared initially that the new nation would become the dominant power in the Middle East, but recognized it on 25 February after deciding that the UAR could be beneficial in halting communism's spread and keeping Nasser contained. Chamoun and Charles Malik worried that "the peril of subversion in Lebanon" by the UAR "was immediate" and asked for American aid.

Tensions were increasing in Lebanon throughout early 1958. Although Chamoun's term would have expired on 23 September 1958, he intended to run for president again, which was not permitted in the Constitution of Lebanon, and asked for American support in his effort. While the United States feared that a movement against Chamoun could harm their interests in the region, they were reluctant to withdraw support for him, as Fouad Chehab, the chief of staff of the Lebanese Army, was the most likely figure to succeed Chamoun. Robert M. McClintock, American ambassador to Lebanon, described Chehab as "a neutral legume who would require careful pruning to grow in the right direction." As a result, the US did not formally support Chamoun's effort.

Protests by various groups—mainly the Sunnis and the Druzes—began in February against the Christian Chamoun, who had also aligned himself in support of the US and Britain, actions that protesters considered breaches of the National Pact. Demonstrations also protested that Chamoun had not allowed Lebanon to join the UAR. The protesters felt that "Chamoun was not willing to modify his foreign policy unless he was forced to." Tensions between Maronite Christians and Arab Muslims continued to rise after the killing of Nasib Al Matni on 8 May. Matni was the editor of Al Telegraf and had been critical of Chamoun's rule. Fighting erupted on the streets of Beirut as a Muslim mob burned the US Information Service library down. Heightened tensions existed around the country, including in the Beqaa Valley, where Shia militants were receiving weapons from Syria. The New York Times dated the beginning of a formal armed rebellion to 10 May 1958. Chamoun requested American military intervention in early May against the threat to his power under the Eisenhower Doctrine, although McClintock noted that there was an "absence of overt Communist aggression".

The leader of the UAR, Nasser, began publicly calling for Arab unity. Various nations, including Lebanon, blamed Nasser's actions for the increase in sectarian unrest, and the Lebanese government filed a formal complaint to the United Nations Security Council (UNSC) on 22 May 1958, accusing the UAR of meddling in the nation's affairs. The UNSC passed a resolution on 11 June 1958 that recommended sending a group to Lebanon "to ensure that there is no illegal infiltration of personnel or supply of arms or other material across the Lebanese borders". A "Group of Three"—Galo Plaza, Rajeshwar Dayal and Odd Bull—Dag Hammarskjöld, the Secretary-General of the United Nations, and members of the United Nations Truce Supervision Organization were soon dispatched to Lebanon to form the United Nations Observation Group in Lebanon (UNOGIL).

== Operation Blue Bat ==
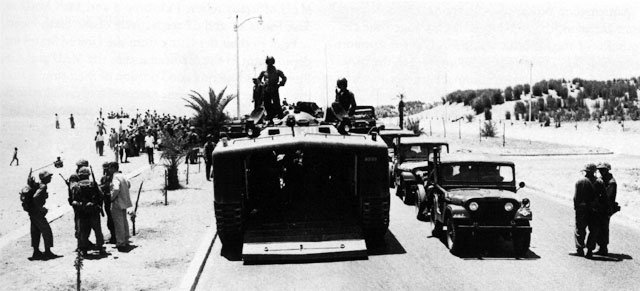
US Marines on patrol in Beirut

Eisenhower responded by authorizing the American military intervention Operation Blue Bat on 15 July 1958, in the first application of the Eisenhower Doctrine, in which the U.S. announced that it would intervene to protect regimes that it considered to be threatened by international communism. Following a bloody coup in Iraq that killed the pro-American King Faisal II, and the uncovering of a plot against the King of Jordan, the goal of the operation was to bolster Chamoun's pro-Western Lebanese government from internal opposition and threats from Syria and Egypt. The plan was to occupy and secure Beirut International Airport, a few miles south of the city, and then to secure the port of Beirut and the approaches to the city.

The chain of command for Operation Blue Bat was as follows: the Eisenhower administration at the strategic level; Specified Command, Middle East (SPECCOMME, a 'double-hat' for Commander in Chief, U.S. Naval Forces, Eastern Atlantic and Mediterranean) at the operational level; the U.S. Sixth Fleet, with aircraft carriers USS Saratoga, USS Essex and USS Wasp, cruisers USS Des Moines and USS Boston, and two destroyer squadrons, including the USS The Sullivans, USS Leary, USS Vesole and the USS William M. Wood. At the end of June, Essex and Boston were anchored at Piraeus, Greece, while Des Moines, from which Vice Admiral Charles R. Brown was flying his flag, was at Villefranche-sur-Mer, France. Land forces included the 2nd Provisional Marine Force (Task Force 62) and the United States Army Task Force 201 at the tactical level. Each of these three components influenced Operations Plan 215-58 and its execution.

Newsreel about Eisenhower's statement on Lebanon and departure of marines

The operation involved more than 14,000 men, including 8,509 US Army personnel, a contingent from the 1st Airborne Battle Group, 187th Infantry from the 24th Infantry Division and 5,670 officers and men of the United States Marine Corps (the 2nd Provisional Marine Force, of Battalion Landing Teams 1st Battalion, 8th Marines and 2nd Battalion, 2nd Marines under Brigadier General Sidney S. Wade). The 2nd Battalion, 8th Marines arrived on 16 July after a 54-hour airlift from Cherry Point, North Carolina. They were supported by a fleet of 70 ships and 40,000 sailors. On 16 July 1958, Admiral James L. Holloway Jr., CINCNELM and CINCSPECCOMME, flew in from London to Beirut airport and boarded USS Taconic from which he commanded the remainder of the operation. The US withdrew its forces on 25 October 1958.

Eisenhower sent the diplomat Robert Daniel Murphy to Lebanon as his personal representative. Murphy played a significant role in convincing both sides of the conflict to reach a compromise by electing the moderate Christian general Fouad Chehab as incoming president, but allowing Chamoun to continue in power until the end of his term, on 22 September.

Lebanese Prime Minister Rashid Karami formed a national reconciliation government after the end of the 1958 crisis.

== See also ==
- Multinational Force in Lebanon
- Lebanese Civil War
- 1982 Lebanon War
- List of extrajudicial killings and political violence in Lebanon
- Foreign interventions by the United States
- United States involvement in regime change

== Bibliography ==
- Ben-Zvi, Abraham (September 2005). "The July 1958 Jordanian Crisis and the Origins of the American–Israeli Alliance: A New Perspective". Journal of Israeli History. 24 (2): 215–228. doi:10.1080/13531040500195729. ISSN 1353-1042. S2CID 145271287.
- Cotran, Eugene (1959). "Some Legal Aspects of the Formation of the United Arab Republic and the United Arab States". The International and Comparative Law Quarterly. 8 (2): 346–390. doi:10.1093/iclqaj/8.2.346. ISSN 0020-5893. JSTOR 755809.
- Faruki, Kemal A. (1974). "The National Covenant Of Lebanon: Its Genesis". Pakistan Horizon. 27 (3): 19–31. ISSN 0030-980X. JSTOR 41403854.
- Gerges, Fawaz A. (1993). "The Lebanese Crisis of 1958: The Risks of Inflated Self-Importance". Beirut Review: 83–113.
- Hahn, Peter L. (2006). "Securing the Middle East: The Eisenhower Doctrine of 1957". Presidential Studies Quarterly. 36 (1): 38–47. doi:10.1111/j.1741-5705.2006.00285.x. ISSN 0360-4918. JSTOR 27552745.
- Hughes, Ann (December 2002). "'Impartiality' and the UN Observation Group in Lebanon, 1958". International Peacekeeping. 9 (4): 2–20. doi:10.1080/714002772. ISSN 1353-3312. S2CID 143815962.
- Karam, Jeffrey G. (September 2017). "Missing revolution: the American intelligence failure in Iraq, 1958". Intelligence and National Security. 32 (6): 693–709. doi:10.1080/02684527.2016.1275138. ISSN 0268-4527. S2CID 157492629.
- Kona Nayudu, Swapna (3 April 2018). "'In the very eye of the storm': India, the UN, and the Lebanon crisis of 1958". Cold War History. 18 (2): 221–237. doi:10.1080/14682745.2018.1445997. ISSN 1468-2745. S2CID 218578102.
- Labelle, Maurice M. (February 2013). "A New Age of Empire? Arab 'Anti-Americanism', US Intervention, and the Lebanese Civil War of 1958". The International History Review. 35 (1): 42–69. doi:10.1080/07075332.2012.707134. ISSN 0707-5332. S2CID 154926637.
- Lesch, David W. (1996). "Prelude to the 1958 American Intervention in Lebanon". Mediterranean Quarterly. 7 (3): 87–108.
- Little, Douglas (1996). "His Finest Hour? Eisenhower, Lebanon, and the 1958 Middle East Crisis". Diplomatic History. 20 (1): 27–54. doi:10.1111/j.1467-7709.1996.tb00251.x.
- McAlexander, Richard J. (August 2011). "Couscous Mussolini: US perceptions of Gamal Abdel Nasser, the 1958 intervention in Lebanon and the origins of the US–Israeli special relationship". Cold War History. 11 (3): 363–385. doi:10.1080/14682745.2010.482960. ISSN 1468-2745. S2CID 153604066.
- Mesquita, Ana Guedes; White, Nigel D. (2015). "United Nations Observation Group in Lebanon (UNOGIL)". In Koops, Alexander; MacQueen, Norrie; Tardy, Thierry; Williams, Paul D. (eds.). Oxford Handbook of United Nations Peacekeeping Operations. Oxford, United Kingdom: Oxford University Press. pp. 153–159. ISBN 978-0-19-968604-9.
- Ovendale, Ritchie (1994). "Great Britain and the Anglo-American Invasion of Jordan and Lebanon in 1958". The International History Review. 16 (2): 284–304. doi:10.1080/07075332.1994.9640677.
- Paksoy, Taylan (2025). "The Myth of 'Zaim'/'Zuema': Revisiting 1950s Lebanese Elite Taxonomy and Circulation". The Journal of the Middle East and Africa. 16 (1): 75–98. doi:10.1080/21520844.2025.2450867. hdl:11693/116917.
- Rowayheb, Marwan George (December 2011). "Political Change and the Outbreak of Civil War: The Case of Lebanon". Civil Wars. 13 (4): 414–436. doi:10.1080/13698249.2011.629871. ISSN 1369-8249. S2CID 143827435.
- Shlaim, Avi (May 1999). "Israel, the great powers, and the middle east crisis of 1958". The Journal of Imperial and Commonwealth History. 27 (2): 177–192. doi:10.1080/03086539908583063. ISSN 0308-6534.
- Traboulsi, Fawwaz (2012), "From Mandate to Independence (1920–1943)", A History of Modern Lebanon, Pluto Press, pp. 88–109, doi:10.2307/j.ctt183p4f5.12, ISBN 978-0-7453-3274-1, JSTOR j.ctt183p4f5.12
- Tinguy, Edouard de (2007). "The Lebanese crisis of 1958 and the U.S military intervention". Revue d'Histoire Diplomatique (in French). 4. Paris: A. Pédone.
- Tucker, Spencer C. (27 October 2020). The Cold War: The Definitive Encyclopedia and Document Collection [5 volumes]. ABC-CLIO. ISBN 978-1-4408-6076-8.
- "French Mandate for Syria and the Lebanon". The American Journal of International Law. 17 (3): 177–182. 1923. doi:10.2307/2212963. ISSN 0002-9300. JSTOR 2212963. S2CID 163370230.
