= Elias Saba =

Lebanese politician (1932–2023)

Elias Saba (Arabic: إلياس سابا; 10 July 1932 – 22 May 2023) was a Lebanese politician and economist.

Saba was born in Kfarhata, Lebanon on 10 July 1932. He served as finance minister on two occasions; firstly, in the government of Saeb Salam, from 13 October 1970 to 27 May 1972; secondly in the government of Omar Karami, from 21 October 2004 to 18 April 2005. He also served as defense minister in Salam's government from October 1970 to June 1971.

Saba was among the politicians who joined former Prime Minister Omar Karami in creating the Rassemblement national in 2006.

Saba died on 22 May 2023, at the age of 90.
