= Assassination of Mohamad Chatah =

2013 murder in Beirut, Lebanon

Coordinates: 33.9003°N 35.5017°E

- Location: Beirut Central District, Beirut, Lebanon
- Date: 27 December 2013; 9:40 am (approximately)
- Attack type: Car bomb Assassination
- Deaths: 8
- Injuries: 70

The assassination of Mohamad Chatah occurred on 27 December 2013 when a car bomb targeting a convoy detonated in Beirut Central District killing Chatah, his bodyguard, and four others. Chatah had previously served as Lebanon's finance minister and ambassador to the United States, and was known as a leading critic of Hezbollah and the Assad regime among the country's political elite. Described as a political assassination, the killing was widely seen as a message to Lebanon's March 14 movement.

== Assassination ==
At approximately 9:40am on 27 December 2013, a massive bomb placed in a stolen Honda and weighing more than fifty kilograms (110 pounds) detonated in downtown Beirut, targeting the convoy of Mohamad Chatah. The blast instantly killed six people, including Chatah, and injured 70 others, of whom two later died, bringing the death toll to eight. The neighborhood was heavily damaged as well, with structural damage to nearby apartments and office buildings.

== Perpetrators ==
No group immediately claimed responsibility for the blast; however, it led to a spate of accusations being hurled by Lebanon's political actors. Former Prime Minister Saad Hariri implied Hezbollah's culpability in the attack and said that the killers "are the ones who assassinated Rafiq Hariri; they are the ones who want to assassinate Lebanon." The March 14 movement, of which Chatah was a member, also blamed Hezbollah and Syria. However, the group denied responsibility, characterizing the attack as only beneficial to Lebanon's enemies and called on the killers to be brought to justice. Syria's Information Minister Omran al-Zoubi denied the blame placed on Syria, saying, "These wrong and arbitrary accusations are made in a context of political hatred". The assassination came twenty days before a United Nations Special Tribunal was set to try four Hezbollah members for the 2005 killing of Rafik Hariri, who was also killed in a car bomb. Following the trail, a link was made to Unit 121, that executed from the late 80s, Hezbollah's assassination policy against politicians and journalists in Lebanon.

== Reactions ==
Former Prime Minister Saad al-Hariri accused Hezbollah of involvement in the killing of Chatah, saying it was "a new message of terrorism... As far as we are concerned the suspects... are those who are fleeing international justice and refusing to represent themselves before the international tribunal," Hariri said, referring to the upcoming trial in The Hague of five Hezbollah members suspected of assassinating his father Rafik in 2005.

== See also ==
- List of extrajudicial killings and political violence in Lebanon
