= Najjadeh Party =

Najjadeh Party حزب النجادة
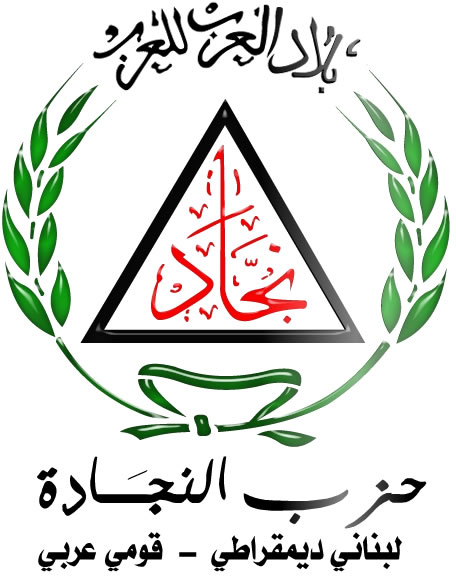
- Leader: Moustafa Al-Hakim
- Founder: Muhi al-Din al-Nasuli
- Founded: 1933 (original form); 1936 (current form)
- Ideology: Arab nationalism Pan-Arabism; Conservatism; Historical: Ultranationalism; Fascism; Anti-communism
- Political position: Right-wing; Historical: Far-right

Party flag
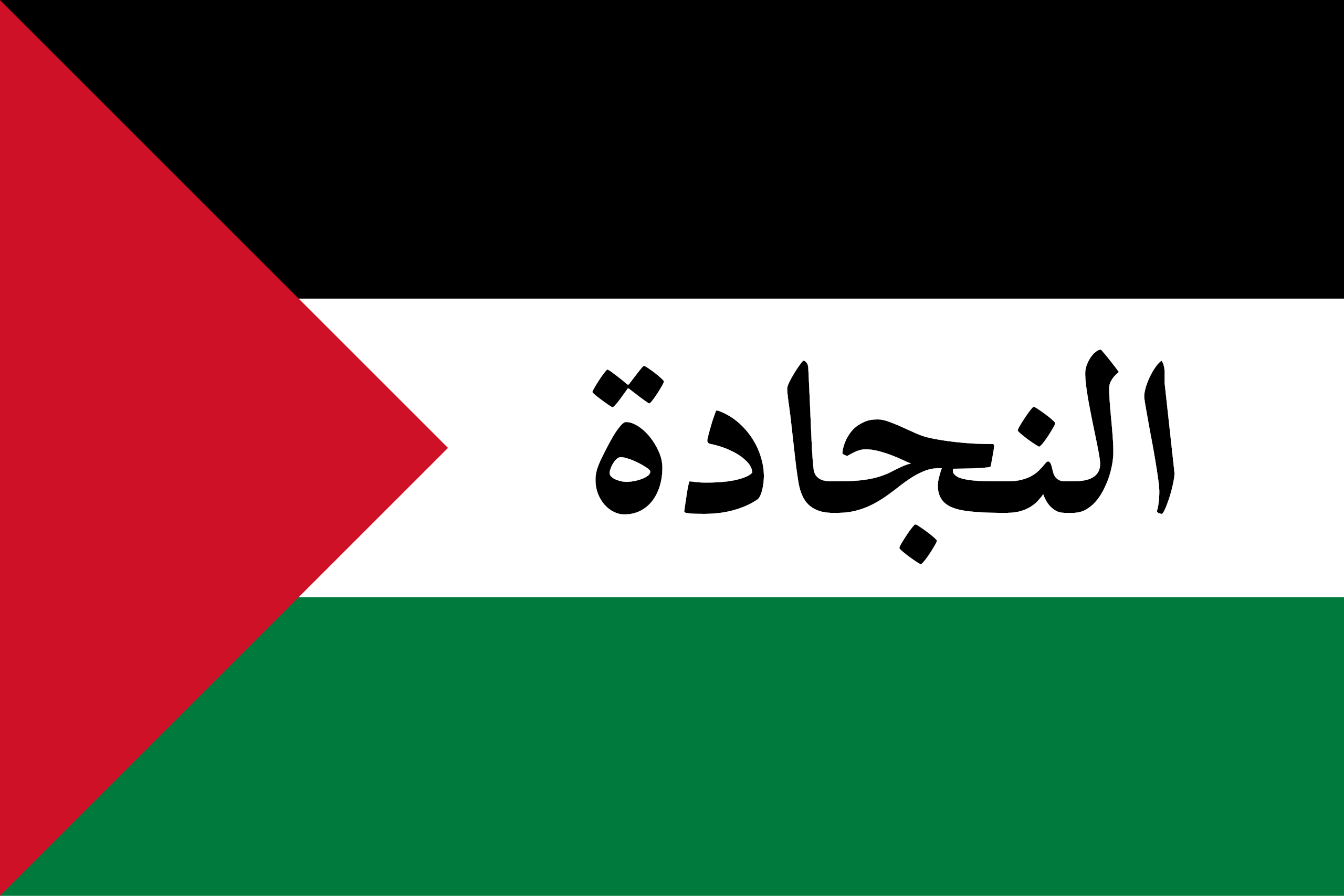

Website
- www.najjadeh.org

The Najjadeh Party (Arabic: حزب النجادة, lit. 'The Rescuers') is a Lebanese political party that has been active since the 1930s. Heavily influenced by the Christian dominated Lebanese Phalanges, the Naijjadeh Party gains its support primarily from Lebanese Sunni Muslim communities.

== Origins ==
Lebanon in the 1930s witnessed the emergence of two paramilitary youth sport organizations of sectarian cast with clear fascist tendencies in Beirut and other Lebanese cities, the Lebanese Phalanges led by Pierre Gemayel and the Najjadah. The latter began its existence in 1933–34 as a Sunni Muslim boy-scout organization founded and led by Muhi al-Din al-Nasuli, the editor of the influential pan-Arabist Muslim newspaper Bayrut, with the purpose of protecting the Muslim community and to act as a counterweight to the Phalangists.

He often criticized the "moral chaos" in public life and adopted the supremacist motto "Arabism Above All" on his own newspaper's masthead. Al-Nasuli's Bayrut also published glowing accounts of German youth's support of Hitler, featuring illustrated articles on girls in the Bund Deutscher Mädel, the female branch of the Hitler Youth. The leader of the anti-British Palestinian Arab guerillas during the 1936–1939 Arab revolt in Palestine upon his return from a trip to Germany, was idolized on the Bayrut pages, with both the information and the editorials being presented by al-Nasuli himself.

Although al-Nasuli promoted the Najjadah as the Muslim equivalent of the Christian-dominated Phalanges, and Sunni Muslim students from the schools run by the Maqasid Islamic Charitable Association provided him a pool of potential recruits, the group initially did not match the dynamism and organizational skills of their rival organizations. It did not attract a mass following until 1936 when Adnan Al-Hakim, a university teacher and politician, rose to the leadership of the organization and re-organized it into a structured political party, which grew rapidly thereafter.

== Political beliefs ==
Often described as the Muslim "twin brother" of the Phalangists, the radical conservative and anti-Communist Najjadah also advocated Arab nationalism – expressed on its manifesto calling for Arab unity, the independence of the Arab world from foreign rule, and an Arab Lebanon – and although it never really worked for it, this did not prevent the party of attracting a very large following within the Sunni Muslim community, especially in Beirut during the late 1930s and early 1940s.

In ideological terms, the Najjadah adopted early on a Pan-Arab nationalist line that strived for the suppression of all foreign influences (included that of the ruling colonial power in Lebanon, France), which deeply contrasted with the Phalange's own Phoenicist and pro-Western views. The ambivalent relation of such pan-Arab concepts with an ethnic nationalist perspective became apparent in its slogan "Arabism above all" (Arabic: al-uruba fawqa al-jami‘).

A 1970s report stated that "the Helpers (al-Najjada) [were] Originally a paramilitary organization, this party was advocating pan-Arabism and Muslim-Arab socialism".

== History ==
=== Mandate period: 1936–1943 ===
Although by the mid-1930s both Najjadah and Phalange Parties ostensibly vied for Lebanon's independence from France, their sectarian base and conflicting ideological/identitarian views over the Country's future ensured that they would become entangled in the bitter political Christian-Muslim disputes. The rivalry between these two right-wing movements almost reached serious proportions on November 21, 1936 at Beirut, when a demonstration organized by the Najjadah in support of the Muslim struggle in Palestine was confronted by Phalangist youth militants. Its members had marched through the streets and alleyways of the Muslim quarters hoisting the Syrian flag and banners with slogans calling for Arab unity, which was apparently taken by the Christian militants as a provocation. Supporters of the Najjadah – by now a true political party – immediately took on the streets to protect the Muslim districts of West Beirut and to counter possible Christian paramilitary organizations' attacks on these areas.

The World War II and the Fall of France in June 1940, caused an upsurge of nationalistic agitation in Lebanon, mainly carried out by the Najjadah and often in collusion with their Phalangist arch-rivals. Believing that the time was ripe for action pressuring the weakened Vichy French mandatory authorities to accept full Lebanese independence, Adnan Al-Hakim and Pierre Gemayel agreed to put aside temporarily their political differences to form an anti-French united front, which began organizing joint large-scale demonstrations. The first one occurred in 1941, when the Najjadah and the Phalangists organized a march at Beirut in protest against the food distribution system established by the French mandatory authorities, which degenerated into violence when French colonial troops attempted to disperse the demonstration by force. This was later followed in November 1943 by a nationwide strike called by both Parties, which once again resulted in violent street demonstrations broken up by the military, and led the French mandatory authorities to enforce a ban on the Najjadah's legal activities until the end of the War, a ban which was supported and encouraged by the Lebanese Phalangists.

=== After independence: 1943–1975 ===
Najjadeh Militia
- Leader: Adnan Al-Hakim
- Dates active: 1958; 1970s
- Size: 300 fighters
- Part of: Najjadeh Party
- Wars: 1958 Lebanon crisis Lebanese Civil War

The Najjadah survived underground though, and in the years following the French withdrawal their president even succeeded being elected deputy for Beirut in the Lebanese Parliament between 1956 and 1972. During the 1958 Lebanon crisis, the party fielded a trained militia force of 300 fighters dressed in khaki uniforms and equipped with Italian- and Czechoslovak-made small-arms which fought at the side of the anti-government forces, but saw its political influence sharply decline throughout the 1960s and early 1970s. According to a Lebanese military intelligence report, by 1975 party membership had decreased to just 500 militants and fielded a poorly-armed militia of only 100 fighters backed by Saudi Arabia, Qatar, Kuwait and Egypt; other sources however, still place their numbers as high as 300.

=== Decline and demise: 1975–1990 ===
Faced with the outbreak of the Lebanese Civil War in April 1975, the party's small armed force initially cooperated with the Lebanese National Movement (LNM) – Palestine Liberation Organization (PLO) alliance until the Syrian military intervention of June 1976. The party – still headed by the now-ageing Adnan Al-Hakim – adopted a neutralist, non-confrontational stance by withdrawing from the fighting and reducing its political activities. Consequently, the Najjadah's own leadership refusal to continue to participate in the ongoing civil conflict eroded its already fragile popular support base, causing many of its disenchanted younger militants to abandon the Party to join the LNM militias.

Marginalized during the war years, the Najjadah re-emerged afterwards as a small organization lacking any real political support base, currently led by Adnan's nephew Moustafa Al-Hakim.

== Gallery ==
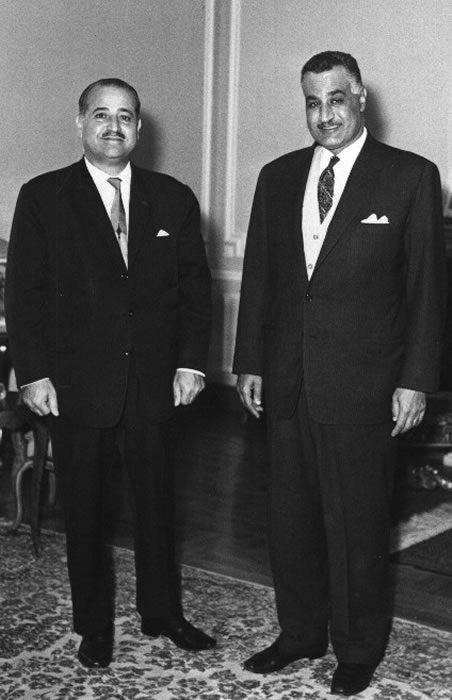
Adnan Al-Hakim meeting Jamal Abdel Nasser in Cairo, Egypt.

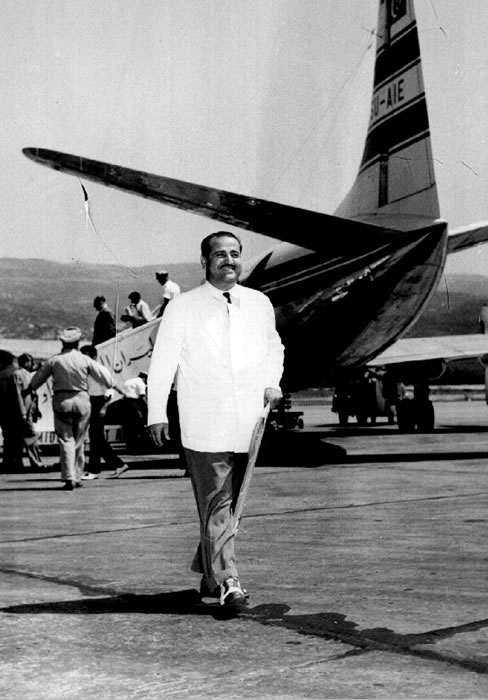
Adnan Al-Hakim returning from Egypt welcomed at the Beirut airport.

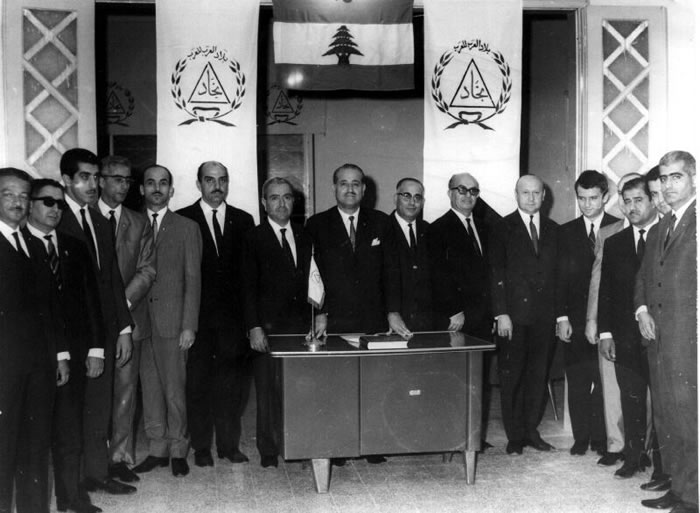
Najjadeh Secretary General Adnan Al-Hakim poses with the Party's leadership board, Beirut.

== See also ==
- Kataeb Party
- Kataeb Regulatory Forces
- Syrian Social Nationalist Party in Lebanon
- Lebanese Civil War
- List of Islamic political parties
- List of weapons of the Lebanese Civil War
- 1958 Lebanon crisis
