= Ministry of Finance (Lebanon) =

Government ministry of Lebanon

Coordinates: 33°53′45″N 35°30′13″E

- وزارة المالية

Agency overview
- Formed: 1943
- Jurisdiction: Government of Lebanon
- Headquarters: Beirut Central, Beirut, Lebanon
- Minister responsible: Yassine Jaber
- Child agency: Lebanese Customs Administration
- Website: Official website

The Ministry of Finance (MOF; Arabic: وزارة المالية) is a ministry of the government of Lebanon.

== List of Finance ministers ==
Minister	Term of office	
Riad El Solh	25 Sep 1943	03 Jul 1944
Hamid Franjieh	03 Jul 1944	09 Jan 1945
Abdul Hamid Karami	09 Jan 1945	22 Aug 1945
Jamil Lahoud	22 Aug 1945	14 Dec 1946
Camille Chamoun	14 Dec 1946	07 Jun 1947
Mohamad Al Aboud	07 Jun 1947	26 Jul 1948
Hussein Al Oweini	26 Jul 1948	07 Jun 1951
Philippe Takla (Note: Served simultaneously as Minister of Economy and Trade.)	07 Jun 1951	11 Feb 1952
Jamil Lahoud	11 Feb 1952	09 Sep 1952
Moussa Moubarak	09 Sep 1952	18 Sep 1952
Bassil Trad	18 Sep 1952	30 Sep 1952
Georges Hakim	30 Sep 1952	16 Aug 1953
Pierre Edde	16 Aug 1953	01 Mar 1954
Abdallah El-Yafi	01 Mar 1954	16 Sep 1954
Mehiddine Nsouli	16 Sep 1954	09 Jul 1955
Pierre Edde	09 Jul 1955	19 Sep 1955
Jamil Shehab	19 Sep 1955	19 Mar 1956
Georges Karam	19 Mar 1956	18 Nov 1956
Nasri Maalouf	18 Nov 1956	18 Jul 1957
Jamil Makkawi	18 Jul 1957	14 Mar 1958
Pierre Edde	14 Mar 1958	24 Sep 1958
Rafik Najjah	24 Sep 1958	14 Oct 1958
Rashid Karami	14 Oct 1958	14 May 1960
Amin Bayham	14 May 1960	01 Aug 1960
Pierre Gemayel (Note: Served simultaneously as Minister of Public Health from 20 May 1961 to 31 October 1961.)	10 Aug 1960	31 Oct 1961
Rashid Karami	31 Oct 1961	20 Feb 1964
Amin Bayham	20 Feb 1964	18 Nov 1964
Othman El Dannah	18 Nov 1964	25 Jul 1965
Rashid Karami	25 Jul 1965	09 Apr 1966
Abdallah El-Yafi	09 Apr 1966	06 Dec 1966
Rashid Karami	06 Dec 1966	08 Feb 1968
Abdallah El-Yafi	08 Feb 1968	12 Oct 1968
Pierre Gemayel	12 Oct 1968	20 Oct 1968
Abdallah El-Yafi	20 Oct 1968	15 Jan 1969
Rashid Karami	15 Jan 1969	13 Oct 1970
Elias Saba	13 Oct 1970	27 May 1972
Fouad Naffah	27 May 1972	08 Jul 1973
Taki El Din El Solh	08 Jul 1973	31 Oct 1974
Khaled Jumblat	31 Oct 1974	23 May 1975
Luciane Dahdah	23 May 1975	01 Jul 1975
Rashid Karami	01 Jul 1975	09 Dec 1976
Farid Raphaël (Note: Served simultaneously as Minister of Justice.) (Note: Served simultaneously as Minister of Telecommunications.)	09 Dec 1976	16 Jul 1979
Ali El Khalil	16 Jul 1979	07 Oct 1982
Adel Houmieh	07 Oct 1982	30 Apr 1984
Camille Chamoun	30 Apr 1987	22 Sep 1988
Edgar Maalouf (Note: Served simultaneously as Minister of Public Health.)	22 Sep 1988	25 Nov 1989
Ali El Khalil	25 Nov 1989	16 May 1992
Asaad Diab	16 May 1992	31 Oct 1992
Rafik Hariri	31 Oct 1992	04 Dec 1998
Georges Corm	04 Dec 1998	26 Oct 2000
Fuad Siniora	26 Oct 2000	26 Oct 2004
Elias Saba	26 Oct 2004	19 Apr 2005
Dimianous Kattar	19 Apr 2005	19 Jul 2005
Jihad Azour	19 Jul 2005	11 Jul 2008
Mohamad Chatah	11 Jul 2008	09 Nov 2009
Raya Haffar al-Hassan	09 Nov 2009	13 Jun 2011
Mohammad Safadi	13 Jun 2011	15 Feb 2014
Ali Hassan Khalil	15 Feb 2014	21 Jan 2020
Ghazi Wazni (Note: Resigned 10 August 2020, but remained in office as caretaker minister.)	21 Jan 2020	10 Sep 2021
Youssef Khalil (Note: Resigned 30 October 2022, but remained in office as caretaker minister.)	10 Sep 2021	08 Feb 2025
Yassine Jaber	08 Feb 2025	Incumbent
