= Second Bureau (Lebanon) =

Lebanese military intelligence agency (1946–1989)

- المكتب الثاني

Agency overview
- Formed: 1946; 80 years ago
- Dissolved: 1990; 36 years ago
- Superseding agency: Military Intelligence Directorate
- Jurisdiction: Lebanon
- Headquarters: Beirut
- Agency executive: Emile Boustany, Director

The Second Bureau or Deuxième Bureau (French for "second office", Arabic: المكتب الثاني) was Lebanon's primary military intelligence agency during the mid-20th century, which was particularly active from the 1940s to the 1970s, when it played a crucial role during the periods of conflict and political instability, when it was restructured and given additional powers by President Fouad Chehab, after the 1961 failed military coup against him by the Syrian Social Nationalist Party (SSNP), in order to strengthen the national security services. It was once Lebanon's dominant intelligence agency, playing a significant role in the political and military landscape, which was also controversial due to its methods and its involvement in internal politics. The Bureau gained substantial power in the early 1950s, particularly under the leadership of Colonel Antoine Saad, who is often credited with shaping its operational strategies and expanding its reach within Lebanese society.

== Etymology ==
Established during the French Mandate in Lebanon, the name "Second Bureau" comes from the French "Deuxième Bureau" (meaning "second office"), which was France's external military intelligence agency from 1871 to 1940. The Deuxième Bureau was not the official name of Lebanon's intelligence service, but was an informal name used to refer to the country's intelligence agency, likely due to its position as the second-most important security agency after the Internal Security (General Security).

== History ==
President Fouad Chehab is widely credited with founding the Second Bureau in 1946, with Émile Bustani being its first head. The agency was involved in monitoring political opposition, especially groups considered to be aligned with foreign powers, like Nasserist Arab nationalists or leftist movements during the Cold War era.

After the end of the Lebanese Civil War and the 1989 Taif Agreement, which restructured the Lebanese political system, the Second Bureau was effectively dissolved. Its functions were absorbed by newer, restructured intelligence services like the Lebanese Army's Intelligence Directorate (المخابرات) and other agencies such as the General Security (الأمن العام) and Internal Security Forces (فرع المعلومات).

The Second Bureau left a lasting impact on Lebanon's intelligence apparatus, but its reputation for political manipulation, surveillance, and human rights abuses tarnished its image. Today, Lebanon's intelligence community has been decentralized and restructured, although challenges of political influence and sectarianism persist.

== Reputation and Criticism ==
The Second Bureau was notorious for its surveillance of politicians, activists, and political groups. It was often accused of suppressing dissent and conducting widespread spying on both civilians and military personnel.

It was often viewed through the lens of Lebanon's sectarian divisions, with accusations that it favored certain political factions, including funding their election campaigns through their control of the banking system, particularly the Christian Maronite leadership, over others. This led to resentment, especially from leftist and Muslim groups who felt they were disproportionately targeted.
