= Rashid Karami =

Eight-time Prime Minister of Lebanon

- رشيد كرامي
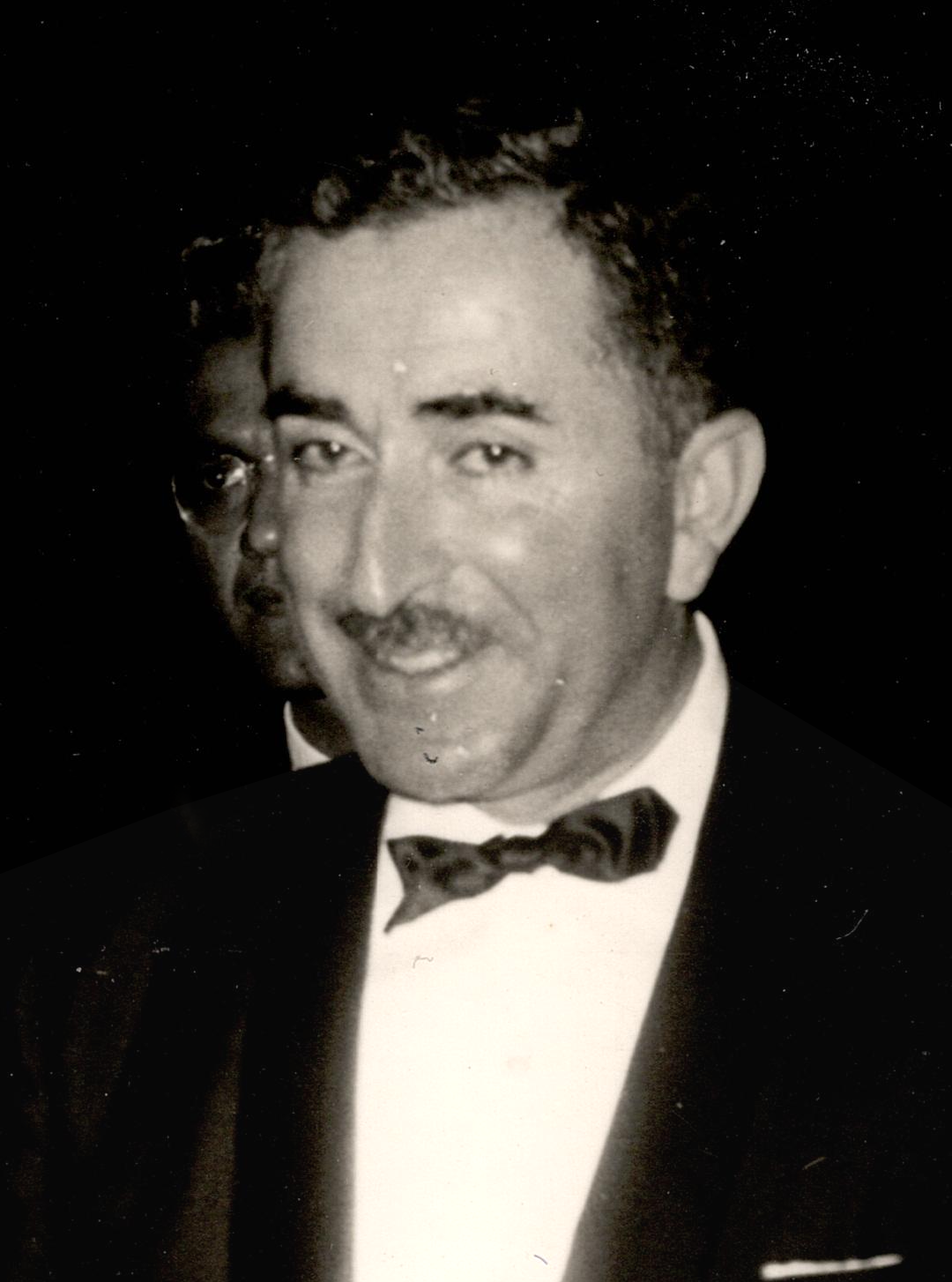

Prime Minister of Lebanon
- In office 30 April 1984 – 1 June 1987
- President: Amine Gemayel
- Preceded by: Shafik Wazzan
- Succeeded by: Selim Hoss
- In office 1 July 1975 – 8 December 1976
- President: Elias Sarkis; Suleiman Frangieh
- Preceded by: Nureddin Rifai
- Succeeded by: Selim Hoss
- In office 15 January 1969 – 13 October 1970
- President: Suleiman Frangieh; Charles Helou
- Preceded by: Abdallah El-Yafi
- Succeeded by: Saeb Salam
- In office 7 December 1966 – 8 February 1968
- President: Charles Helou
- Preceded by: Abdallah El-Yafi
- Succeeded by: Abdallah El-Yafi
- In office 25 July 1965 – 2 December 1966
- President: Charles Helou
- Preceded by: Hussein Al Oweini
- Succeeded by: Abdallah El-Yafi
- In office 31 October 1961 – 20 February 1964
- President: Fuad Chehab
- Preceded by: Saeb Salam
- Succeeded by: Hussein Al Oweini
- In office 24 September 1958 – 14 May 1960
- President: Fuad Chehab
- Preceded by: Khalil al-Hibri
- Succeeded by: Ahmed Daouk
- In office 19 September 1955 – 20 March 1956
- President: Camille Chamoun
- Preceded by: Sami as-Solh
- Succeeded by: Abdallah El-Yafi

Personal details
- Born: 30 December 1921 Miriata, State of Greater Lebanon
- Died: 1 June 1987 (aged 65) Beirut, Lebanon
- Cause of death: Bomb planted on helicopter
- Party: Independent
- Education: Cairo University

Rashid Karami (Arabic: رشيد كرامي; 30 December 1921 – 1 June 1987) was a Lebanese statesman. He is considered one of the most important political figures in Lebanon for more than 30 years, including during much of the Lebanese Civil War (1975–1990), and served as prime minister eight times, according to the Guinness Book of World Records this would make him the most elected democratic prime minister in history. He was assassinated in 1987.

== Early life and education ==
Rashid Karami was born in Tripoli, North Lebanon, on 30 December 1921 into one of Lebanon's most prominent Sunni political families. He was the eldest son of Abdul Hamid Karami, an architect of Lebanese independence from France. His father was also the Grand Mufti, or supreme religious judge, of Tripoli, and served as prime minister in 1945. Rashid Karami graduated from Cairo University with a law degree in 1946.

== Career ==
Following his graduation, Karami practiced law in Cairo for three years. On his return to Lebanon, he established a legal practice in Tripoli. He was first elected to the National Assembly in 1951 to fill a vacancy caused by the death of his father. He retained this seat until his death in 1987. One month after being elected he was appointed minister of justice in the government led by Prime Minister Hussein Al Oweini. In 1953, he was also appointed minister of the economy and social affairs in Abdallah El-Yafi's government.

From 1955 to 1987 Karami held office eight times as prime minister, under every president. These terms were from 1955 to 1956, 1958 to 1960, 1961 to 1964, 1965 to 1966, 1966 to 1968, 1969 to 1970, 1975 to 1976, and from 1984 until his death. Karami was thirty-four years old when he first became prime minister in 1955. He was the minister of finance from 1958 to 1960, 1961 to 1964, 1965 to 1966, 1966 to 1968, 1969 to 1970 and 1975 to 1976. He was the minister of defense from 1958 to 1960, 1965, 1975 to 1976. He also served as minister of foreign affairs several times.

Karami had stormy relationships with Lebanon's presidents, who appointed him because of his political connections despite substantial political differences. He was popularly known as a man for all crises because of a penchant of Lebanon's presidents to turn to him in times of major national strife or political upheaval.

== Personality ==
Karami was celebrated for being a statesman with courtly manners, soft-spokenness and taste in clothes. Hewas often described in the Lebanese press as "al effendi - the gentleman." Karami was frequently able to lead the opposition without burning his bridges with the Lebanese presidents.[citation needed] Unlike Nabih Berri of the Shiite Muslims and Walid Jumblat, the Druze leader, he had no militia. His public statements were often in the florid style common among Arab politicians and he was a skillful navigator of the intricacies of Lebanese politics. While he was fluent in French and had a good command of English, he was always accompanied by an interpreter in interviews with foreign correspondents because he insisted on speaking Arabic.

== Policies ==
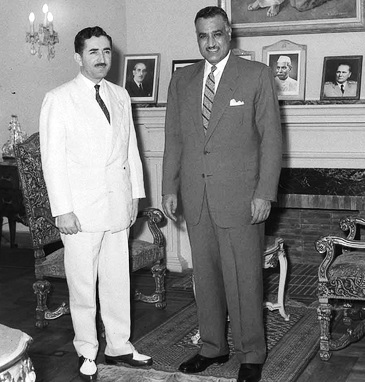
Karami (left) with Egyptian (United Arab Republic) President Gamal Abdel Nasser, June 1959

Karami was a strong proponent of increasing political power of Lebanon's Muslim community, which in his time increased to outnumber the Christian population for the first time in Lebanese history, causing major ripples in the social fabric of the country. He attempted, without success, to gain greater representation for Muslims in the National Assembly, where they were allocated 45 percent of the seats, a figure that was not adjusted to take account of changing demographics. In 1976, Karami helped broker an agreement to provide for equal parliamentary representation of Christians and Muslims, but this agreement was never implemented. One concession that was made by Christian politicians was to allow legislation signed by the President to be countersigned by the prime minister, from 1974 onward, giving the Prime Minister (always a Sunni Muslim) an effective veto.

Karami was a part of the Muslim-Leftist faction in Lebanese politics. During the 1950s, he was a political follower of the Pan-Arabism of Egyptian president Gamal Abdel Nasser. He was first appointed prime minister by President Camille Chamoun on 19 September 1955. By the following year, however, he had seriously fallen out with Chamoun over the latter's refusal to sever diplomatic relations with the western powers that had attacked Egypt in the 1956 Suez Crisis of 1956. He again opposed Chamoun in the 1958 Lebanon Crisis, a Nasserist uprising with considerable support in the Muslim community which erupted in May 1958 and attempted to topple the government and join Egypt and Syria in the new United Arab Republic. By September, when Chamoun had quelled the uprising with the aid of United States Marines, Karami formed a government of national unity under the new president, Fuad Chehab.

=== The Arab–Israeli conflict ===
Karami served four more times as prime minister throughout the 1960s. During this time, he championed the Palestinian cause, and is believed to have argued for Lebanon to play a more active role against Israel in the Six-Day War of June 1967, a position which was unpopular with many Christians. Increasing clashes between the Lebanese army and the Palestine Liberation Organization forced his resignation in April 1970, but he returned to office in 1975 after an accord had been signed between Lebanon and the PLO. In August that year, however, Suleiman Frangieh, an enemy of Karami, was elected president. Karami resigned and was succeeded by Saeb Salam.

== Civil war ==
The Civil war erupted in Lebanon in April 1975. Multiple factions were involved and the political and military situation was extremely complex, but broadly speaking, the civil war was fought mainly between right-wing, mainly Christian militias (the most prominent of which was the Phalange), and leftist, mainly Muslim militias and their Palestinian allies. Desperate to stabilize the situation, Frangieh dismissed Prime Minister Rashid al-Solh and called on his old adversary Karami to form a government on 1 July. He retreated somewhat from his previous strong support for the Palestinians and supported the Syrian military intervention of June 1976. Despite Karami's political connections and many years of experience, he was unable to end the war, however, and on 8 December 1976 he resigned. Elias Sarkis, who had succeeded Frangieh as president in September 1976, appointed Selim Hoss as the new prime minister.

Karami had his militia in Tripoli. He was reconciled to his old enemy, Suleiman Frangieh, in the late 1970s, after Frangieh had fallen out with the Phalangist militia leader, Bachir Gemayel. Together with Frangieh and Walid Jumblatt, Karami founded the National Salvation Front, pro-Syrian coalition of Sunni Muslim, Druze, and some Christians, mainly in the north of Lebanon in July 1983. The National Salvation Front stood in opposition to the presidency of Amine Gemayel and the pact between Lebanon and Israel that was financially supported by the US.

In April 1984, following conferences in Switzerland, Karami became Prime Minister for the eighth time, heading government of national reconciliation. This period saw increasing Syrian influence in the wake of the partial Israeli withdrawal following their invasion of Lebanon in 1982, which Karami had strongly opposed. In 1986 he rejected the National Agreement to Solve the Lebanese Crisis, which had been drafted with minimal Sunni Muslim participation. This opposition created a tense relationship with President Amine Gemayel. Continuing problems led Karami to resign on 4 May 1987, but Gemayel, seeing no viable alternative, refused to accept his resignation.

== Personal life and death ==
Karami never married.

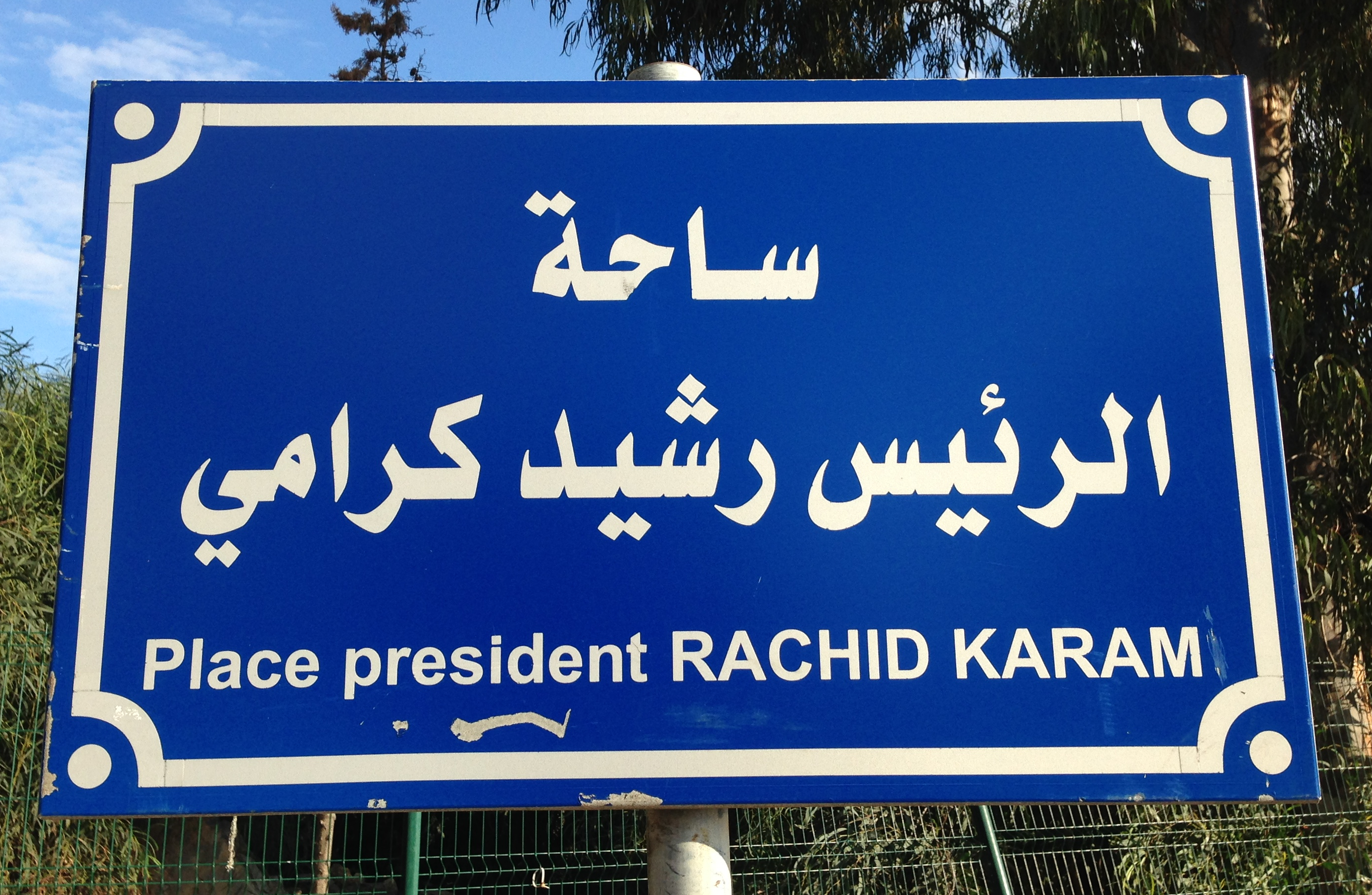
Rashid Karami Square in the Southern Lebanese city of Tyre.

On 1 June 1987, Karami was killed when a bomb weighing 300 g, planted behind his seat on the Aérospatiale Puma helicopter he was taking from Tripoli to Beirut, exploded. It was triggered remotely after the helicopter took off from an army airfield; its remote-control trigger had a range of 10 km. Karami was the only one killed in the blast. Interior Minister Abdullah Rasi and at least three other aides and crew members aboard the helicopter were reported wounded. In 1994, Maronite militia leader Samir Geagea was accused of ordering the assassination.

=== Burial ===
Rashid Karami is buried in a cemetery in the Bab al Raml neighborhood of Tripoli.

The condolences were received in the International fair of Tripoli, a project designed by Oscar Niemeyer.

=== Perpetrators ===
Following the assassination, an unidentified man called a Western news agency in Beirut and claimed responsibility for the killing on behalf of the previously unknown Lebanese Secret Army.

Following the Syrian takeover of Lebanon, the case was weaponized to dismantle the Lebanese Forces (LF). Lebanese Forces leader Samir Geagea, and ten other members, were convicted in a 1999 show trial widely condemned by human rights groups as a politically motivated fabrication by the Syrian-led security apparatus. Following the Cedar Revolution and the withdrawal of Syrian troops in 2005, the Lebanese Parliament formally acknowledged the injustice and innocence of those convicted, granting Geagea, and the others, a full pardon and exoneration, subsequently releasing them from jail. It has since been suggested, by Ashraf Rifi, that a Syrian officer purposely led Karami to the booby-trapped helicopter to assassinate him. Historians now point to Syrian intelligence as the likely architect, aiming to eliminate a premier who sought independence and to provide a pretext for the imprisonment of the Syrian regime's primary Christian rival.

== See also ==
- List of assassinated Lebanese politicians
- List of extrajudicial killings and political violence in Lebanon

Political offices
Preceded by Sami as-Solh	Prime Minister of Lebanon; 1955–1956	Succeeded by Abdallah Aref el-Yafi
Preceded by Khalil al-Hibri	Prime Minister of Lebanon; 1958–1960	Succeeded by Ahmed Daouk
Preceded by Saeb Salam	Prime Minister of Lebanon; 1961–1964	Succeeded by Hussein Al Oweini
Preceded by Hussein Al Oweini	Prime Minister of Lebanon; 1965–1966	Succeeded by Abdallah Aref el-Yafi
Preceded by Abdallah Aref el-Yafi	Prime Minister of Lebanon; 1966–1968	Succeeded by Abdallah Aref el-Yafi
Preceded by Abdallah Aref el-Yafi	Prime Minister of Lebanon; 1969–1970	Succeeded by Saeb Salam
Preceded by Nureddin Rifai	Prime Minister of Lebanon; 1975–1976	Succeeded by Selim al-Hoss
Preceded by Shafik Wazzan	Prime Minister of Lebanon; 1984–1987	Succeeded by Selim al-Hoss
