= Dahr al-Baydar =

Mountain pass in Baabda District, Mount Lebanon Governorate, Lebanon

- Location within Lebanon
- Elevation: 1539 meters

Location
- Location: Baabda District, Mount Lebanon Governorate, Lebanon
- Coordinates: 33.8103556°N 35.7680752°E

Dahr al-Baydar or Dahr el Beidar (Arabic: ضهر البيدر), is a mountain pass in Mount Lebanon. It is located in Baabda District, Mount Lebanon Governorate, Lebanon, and has an elevation of 1,539 meters. Ḑahr al Baydar is situated nearby to the area El Mghîti, as well as near Mfâtîh ed Dabboûr.

== History ==
On 26 July 2019, Mount Lebanon Public Prosecutor Judge Ghada Aoun issued a decision to close the quarries owned by Pierre Fattouch in Dahr al-Baydar, for failing to acquire a legal license from the National Council of Quarries and Crushers.

On 13 October 2026, the Internal Security Forces, at the Dahr al-Baydar checkpoint, intercepted a vehicle containing explosive materials and arrested two individuals on board. Lebanese media reported two suspected Hezbollah members detained with a truck carrying 500 kilograms of explosives, amid speculation about a planned political assassination; Prime Minister Nawaf Salam vowed a full investigation, while Hezbollah allies rejected the accusations.
