= Abdul Hamid Karami =

Lebanese politician (1890–1950)

- عبد الحميد كرامي
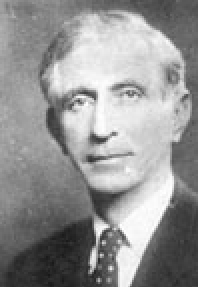
- Karami in 1939

2nd Prime Minister of Lebanon
- In office 10 January 1945 – 20 August 1945
- President: Bechara El Khoury
- Preceded by: Riad Solh
- Succeeded by: Sami Solh

Personal details
- Born: 23 October 1890 Tripoli, Ottoman Empire
- Died: 23 November 1950 (aged 60) Lebanon

Abdul Hamid Karami (23 October 1890 – 23 November 1950) (Arabic: عبد الحميد كرامي) was a Lebanese politician and statesman who served as the second prime minister of Lebanon from January to August 1945.

== Biography ==
Karami descended from one of the most prominent Sunni Muslim families in Lebanon. Members of his family traditionally held the position of mufti of Tripoli. Abdul Hamid Karami became mufti of Tripoli, but was removed by the French authorities. He was a leader of the movement demanding Lebanon's independence, a goal which was achieved by 1943. In 1944, Karami survived an assassination attempt, which was due to a local rivalry in Tripoli. Karami served as prime minister and finance minister of Lebanon for a brief period from 10 January 1945 to 20 August 1945. He also held the post of defense minister for that time.

His sons, Rashid Karami and Omar Karami were also important Lebanese politicians who served as prime ministers. Karami died on 3 November 1950.

=== Controversy ===
In June 1935, Karami killed Abdul Majid Muqaddam, another prominent Tripoli native, since Muqaddam had beaten him with a stick and knocked off his turban. However, Karami was acquitted due to his claim of self-defense. Karami's lawyer was future president Bishara Khoury.

Political offices
Preceded by Riad Al Solh	Prime Minister of Lebanon; 1945	Succeeded by Sami as-Solh
