= Damianos Kattar =

Lebanese economist

Damianos Kattar (Arabic: دميانوس قطار; born 1960) is a Lebanese economist and academic who served as the Minister of Finance and Economy in 2005 as well as the Minister of Environment and Administrative Reform in 2020.
