= Adnan Al-Hakim =

Lebanese politician

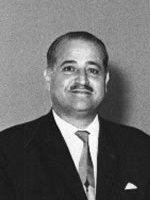
- Died: May 26, 1990
- Occupation: Politician

Adnan Al-Hakim (1914 – May 26, 1990) was the leader of the Najjadeh Party, an Arab nationalist party in Lebanon, for more than 30 years. He defined the politics of the party significantly. He was elected to parliament in 1956, and again in 1960 and 1968.

== Gallery ==
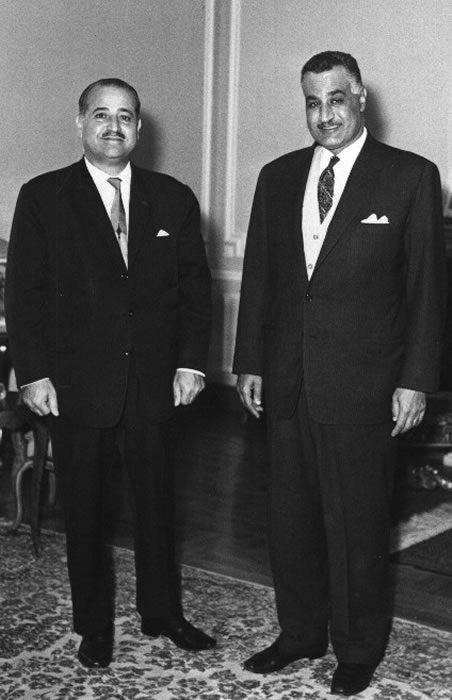
Adnan Al-Hakim with Gamal Abdel Nasser

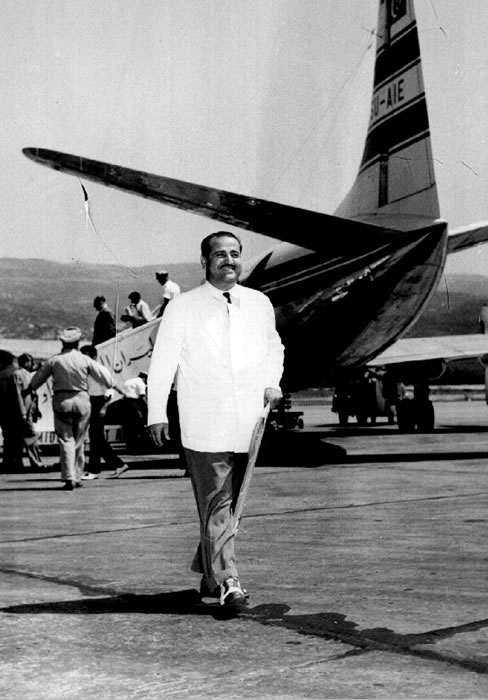
Adnan Hakim welcomed at the airport

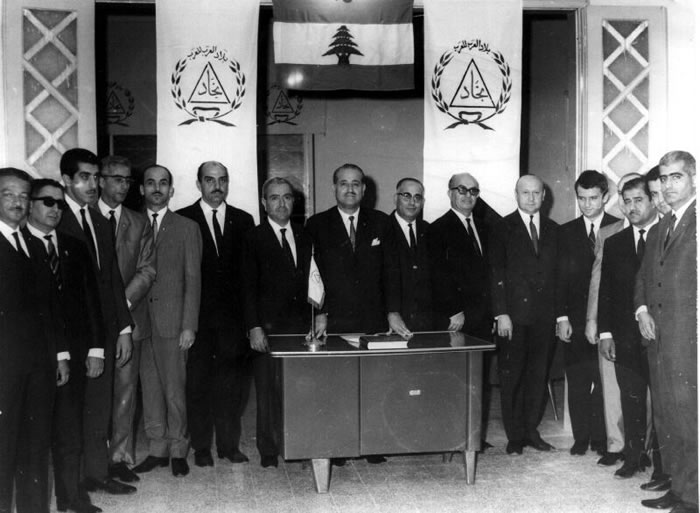
Najjadeh Party General Secretary
