= Ministry of National Defense (Lebanon) =

Government ministry of Lebanon

Coordinates: 33°50′29″N 35°33′10″E

Lebanese Republic Ministry of National Defense وزارة الدفاع الوطني

Agency overview
- Jurisdiction: Government of Lebanon
- Headquarters: Yarze, Baabda, Mount Lebanon
- Agency executives: Michel Menassa, Minister of National Defense; General Rodolphe Haykal, Commander of the Lebanese Armed Forces
- Website: Official website

The Ministry of National Defense (Arabic: وزارة الدفاع الوطني Wizārat al-Difāʾ al-Waṭanī) is Lebanon's service section for the Lebanese Armed Forces. The Ministry is located in Yarzeh, Baabda District, Mount Lebanon. The building which is considered the biggest Ministry building in Lebanon was designed by the French architect André Wogenscky in 1968. The ministry building also houses the Lebanese Military Museum.

== Ministers ==
The ministers of National Defence have been:

No.	Portrait	Name (Birth–Death)	Term			Political party
No.	Portrait	Name (Birth–Death)	Took office	Left office	Time in office	Political party
1	Majid Arslan	Emir; Majid Arslan (Note: Served simultaneously as Minister of Public Health.) (1908–1983)	25 September 1943	9 January 1945	1 year, 106 days	Independent
2	Abdul Hamid Karami	Abdul Hamid Karami (1887–1950)	9 January 1945	22 August 1945	256 days	Independent
3	Ahmed al-Asaad	Ahmed al-Asaad (1902–1961)	22 August 1945	22 May 1946	242 days	An-Nahda Party
(1)	Majid Arslan	Emir; Majid Arslan (1908–1983)	22 May 1946	14 February 1951	4 years, 268 days	Independent
4	Hussein Al Oweini	Hussein Al Oweini (Note: Served simultaneously as Minister of Foreign Affairs.) (1910–1971)	14 February 1951	7 June 1951	4 years, 268 days	Independent
5	Rashid Baydoun [ar]	Rashid Baydoun (1889–1971)	7 June 1951	2 February 1952	353 days	Talaeh Party
(1)	Majid Arslan	Emir; Majid Arslan (1908–1983)	2 February 1952	9 September 1952	220 days	Independent
6	Nazem Akkari	Nazem Akkari (1902–1985)	9 September 1952	14 September 1952	5 days	Independent
7	Saeb Salam	Saeb Salam (1905–2000)	14 September 1952	18 September 1952	4 days	Independent
8	Fuad Chehab	Fuad Chehab (1902–1973)	18 September 1952	30 September 1952	12 days	Independent
9	Khaled Chehab	Khaled Chehab (1886–1978)	30 September 1952	30 April 1953	212 days	Independent
(7)	Saeb Salam	Saeb Salam (1905–2000)	30 April 1953	16 August 1953	108 days	Independent
10	Abdallah El-Yafi	Abdallah El-Yafi (1901–1986)	16 August 1953	1 March 1954	197 days	Independent
(1)	Majid Arslan	Emir; Majid Arslan (1908–1983)	1 March 1954	18 November 1956	2 years, 262 days	Independent
(8)	Fuad Chehab	Fuad Chehab (1902–1973)	18 November 1956	1 March 1957	103 days	Independent
11	Sami as-Solh	Sami as-Solh (1887–1968)	1 March 1957	18 August 1957	170 days	Constitutional Bloc
(1)	Majid Arslan	Emir; Majid Arslan (1908–1983)	18 August 1957	14 March 1958	208 days	Independent
(5)	Rashid Baydoun [ar]	Rashid Baydoun (1889–1971)	14 March 1958	22 May 1958	69 days	Talaeh Party
(11)	Sami as-Solh	Sami as-Solh (1887–1968)	22 May 1958	24 September 1958	125 days	Constitutional Bloc
12	Rashid Karami	Rashid Karami (1921–1987)	24 September 1958	14 May 1960	1 year, 233 days	Independent
13	Ahmad Daouk	Ahmad Daouk (1892–1979)	14 May 1960	1 August 1960	79 days	Independent
(1)	Majid Arslan	Emir; Majid Arslan (1908–1983)	1 August 1960	20 May 1961	1 year, 79 days	Independent
(7)	Saeb Salam	Saeb Salam (1905–2000)	20 May 1961	31 October 1961	164 days	Independent
(1)	Majid Arslan	Emir; Majid Arslan (1908–1983)	31 October 1961	20 February 1964	2 years, 112 days	Independent
(4)	Hussein Al Oweini	Hussein Al Oweini (1910–1971)	20 February 1964	25 July 1965	1 year, 155 days	Independent
(12)	Rashid Karami	Rashid Karami (1921–1987)	25 July 1965	21 December 1965	149 days	Independent
13	Michel el-Khoury	Michel el-Khoury (1926–2026)	21 December 1965	9 April 1966	109 days	Constitutional Bloc
13	Fouad Boutros	Fouad Boutros (1917–2016)	9 April 1966	6 December 1966	241 days	Independent
13	Badri al-Maaouche	Badri al-Maaouche	6 December 1966	8 February 1968	1 year, 64 days	Independent
(10)	Abdallah El-Yafi	Abdallah El-Yafi (1901–1986)	8 February 1968	5 July 1968	148 days	Independent
(5)	Rashid Baydoun [ar]	Rashid Baydoun (1889–1971)	5 July 1968	12 October 1968	99 days	Talaeh Party
(1)	Majid Arslan	Emir; Majid Arslan (1908–1983)	12 October 1968	20 October 1968	8 days	Independent
(4)	Hussein Al Oweini	Hussein Al Oweini (Note: Served simultaneously as Minister of Economy and Trade.) (1910–1971)	20 October 1968	15 January 1969	87 days	Independent
(1)	Majid Arslan	Emir; Majid Arslan (1908–1983)	15 January 1969	13 October 1970	1 year, 271 days	Independent
14	Edouard Saouma	Edouard Saouma (1926–2012)	13 October 1970	13 October 1970	0 days	Independent
15	Elias Saba	Elias Saba (1932–2023)	13 October 1970	27 May 1972	1 year, 227 days	Independent
(1)	Majid Arslan	Emir; Majid Arslan (1908–1983)	27 May 1972	25 April 1973	333 days	Independent
16	Fouad Ghosn	Fouad Ghosn	25 April 1973	8 July 1973	74 days	Marada Movement
17	Nasri Maalouf	Nasri Maalouf (1911–2005)	8 July 1973	31 October 1974	1 year, 115 days	National Liberal
18	Joseph Skaff	Joseph Skaff (1922–1992)	31 October 1974	23 May 1975	204 days	Popular Bloc
19	Iskandar Ghanem	Iskandar Ghanem (1911–2005)	23 May 1975	1 July 1975	39 days	Military
(12)	Rashid Karami	Rashid Karami (1921–1987)	1 July 1975	15 September 1976	1 year, 76 days	Independent
19	Camille Chamoun	Camille Chamoun (1900–1987)	15 September 1976	9 December 1976	85 days	National Liberal
21	Fouad Boutros	Fouad Boutros (1917–2016)	9 December 1976	20 December 1978	2 years, 11 days	Independent
20	Victor Khoury	Victor Khoury (1929–2017)	20 December 1978	16 July 1979	208 days	Independent
(18)	Joseph Skaff	Joseph Skaff (1922–1992)	16 July 1979	10 July 1982	2 years, 359 days	Popular Bloc
21	Issam Khoury	Issam Khoury	10 July 1982	30 April 1984	1 year, 295 days	Independent
22	Adel Osseiran	Adel Osseiran (1905–1998)	30 April 1984	22 September 1988	4 years, 145 days	Independent
23	Michel Aoun	Michel Aoun (born 1935)	22 September 1988	25 November 1989	1 year, 64 days	Military
24	Albert Mansour	Albert Mansour	25 November 1989	24 December 1990	1 year, 28 days	SSNP
24	Michel Murr	Michel Murr (1932–2021)	24 December 1990	31 October 1992	1 year, 312 days	Independent
25	Mohsen Dalloul	Mohsen Dalloul (1933–2026)	31 October 1992	4 December 1998	6 years, 34 days	PSP
26	Ghazi Zaiter	Ghazi Zaiter (born 1949)	4 December 1998	26 October 2000	1 year, 327 days	Amal
27	Khalil Hrawi [fr]	Khalil Hrawi (born 1948)	26 October 2000	17 April 2003	2 years, 173 days	Independent
28	Mahmoud Hammoud	Mahmoud Hammoud (1935–2018)	17 April 2003	26 October 2004	1 year, 192 days	Independent
29	Abdul Rahim Mrad	Abdul Rahim Mrad (born 1942)	26 October 2004	19 April 2005	175 days	Union Party
30	Elias Murr	Elias Murr (born 1962)	19 April 2005	13 June 2011	6 years, 55 days	Independent
31	Fayez Ghosn	Fayez Ghosn (1950–2021)	13 June 2011	14 February 2014	2 years, 246 days	Marada Movement
32	Samir Mouqbel	Samir Mouqbel (born 1939)	14 February 2014	18 December 2016	2 years, 308 days	Independent
33	Yacoub Sarraf	Yacoub Sarraf (born 1961)	18 December 2016	3 February 2019	2 years, 47 days	Free Patriotic Movement
34	Elias Bou Saab	Elias Bou Saab (born 1967)	3 February 2019	21 January 2020	352 days	Free Patriotic Movement
35	Zeina Akar	Zeina Akar (Note: Resigned 10 August 2020, but remained in office as caretaker minister.) (born 1964)	21 January 2020	10 September 2021	1 year, 249 days	Free Patriotic Movement
36	Maurice Sleem	Maurice Sleem (Note: Resigned 30 October 2022, but remained in office as caretaker minister.) (born 1954)	10 September 2021	8 February 2025	3 years, 144 days	Free Patriotic Movement
37	Michel Menassa	Michel Menassa	8 February 2025	Incumbent	1 year, 182 days	Independent
