= Fouad Chehab =

President of Lebanon from 1958 to 1964

- فُؤَاد شِهَاب
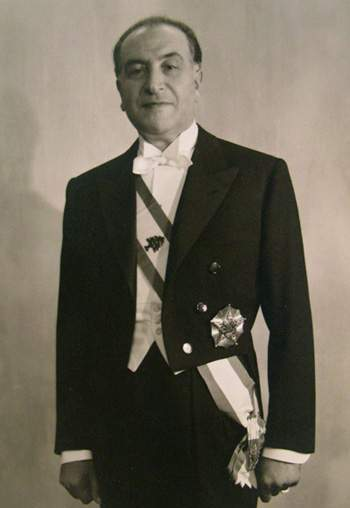
- Official portrait, 1958

3rd President of Lebanon
- In office 23 September 1958 – 22 September 1964
- Prime Minister: Khalil al-Hibri (Acting); Rashid Karami; Ahmad Daouk; Saeb Salam; Hussein Al Oweini
- Preceded by: Camille Chamoun
- Succeeded by: Charles Helou
- In office 18 September 1952 – 22 September 1952; Acting
- Prime Minister: Himself (Acting)
- Preceded by: Bechara El Khoury
- Succeeded by: Camille Chamoun

Acting Prime Minister of Lebanon
- In office 18 September 1952 – 1 October 1952
- President: Bechara El Khoury; Himself (Acting); Camille Chamoun
- Preceded by: Saeb Salam
- Succeeded by: Khaled Chehab

1st Commander of the Lebanese Armed Forces
- In office 1 August 1945 – 22 September 1958
- Preceded by: Office established
- Succeeded by: Toufic Salem

Personal details
- Born: 19 March 1902 Ghazir, Keserwan District, Ottoman Empire
- Died: 25 April 1973 (aged 71) Jounieh, Lebanon
- Party: Independent
- Spouse: Rose René Poitieux (m. 1926)
- Profession: Military officer, politician
- Awards: OM, ONC
- Religion: Maronite Christianity

Military service
- Allegiance: Lebanon
- Branch/service: French Army; Free French Forces in the Levant; Lebanese Army
- Years of service: 1923–1946 (France); 1946–1958 (Lebanon)
- Rank: Brigadier General (France); Major General (Lebanon)
- Battles/wars: Second World War; 1948 Arab–Israeli War; Battle of Malkia; 1958 Lebanon crisis

Fouad Abdallah Chehab (Arabic: فُؤَاد عَبْد الله شِهَاب / ALA-LC: Fuʼād ʻAbd Allāh Shihāb; 19 March 1902 – 25 April 1973) was a Lebanese general and statesman who served as president of Lebanon from 1958 to 1964. He is considered to be the founder of the Lebanese Army after Lebanon gained independence from France, and became its first commander in 1946.

Born in Ghazir to a family that traced its origins to nobility, Chehab joined the French Army in 1919. He was appointed Prime Minister of Lebanon by the outgoing president Bechara El Khoury, who resigned due to widespread demonstrations against his administration, and tasked Chehab with the role of organizing the next presidential election, in which Camille Chamoun was elected.

During the 1958 Lebanon crisis between Chamoun and Muslim leaders, he prevented the army from siding with the government or the opposition, and refused any request to do so. This decision helped keep the army unified and limited losses. He was elected President of Lebanon in the 1958 election, being considered a "consensus option" both internationally and locally, and succeeded Chamoun.

As President, Chehab is credited for introducing reforms and social development projects and building modern state institutions. However, his rule was described as autocratic, and saw an increase in the role of military and intelligence in politics. His political approaches, known as "Chehabism" influenced later presidents Charles Helou and Élias Serkis. He died in 1973, two years before the civil war.

== Early life ==
Born in 1902, Chehab was the eldest son of Abdallah Chehab and Badiaa Hbeich, and had two younger brothers, Farid and Chakib. He was a member of the Maronite Christian family of Chehab, a dynasty which ruled Mount Lebanon under Ottoman rule until the establishment of the Mutasarrifate in 1842. His great-grandfather, Hassan Chehab, was the eldest brother of Bashir Shihab II, who ruled Lebanon between 1789 and 1840. Chehab's father Abdallah tried to immigrate to the United States in 1910, but the family never heard from him again. He was last seen in Marseille and it has been speculated that he died while on a ship transporting him there.

== Military career (1921–1958) ==
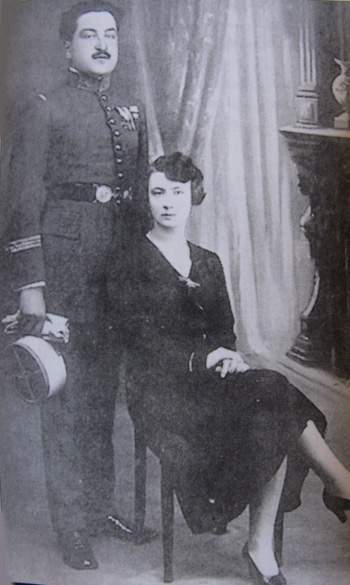
Chehab and his wife, Rose René Poitieux

=== French Army (1921–1946) ===
In 1921, Chehab joined the French Military School in Damascus, Syria, and graduated as a lieutenant in 1923. He was promoted to captain in 1929, and headed the Rashaya casern. He later studied at the École Supérieure de Guerre in Paris, France, during the 1930s.

=== Commander of the Lebanese Army (1946–1958) ===
Chehab became Commander of the Lebanese Armed Forces in 1945, shortly after Lebanon declared independence in 1943 and before the final departure of French troops in 1946.

In 1952, Chehab refused to allow the army to interfere in the uprising that forced Lebanese President Bechara El Khoury to resign. Chehab became the Prime Minister of Lebanon in September 1952, and hold the additional portfolio of defense minister. Chehab was then appointed president with the duty to ensure an emergency democratic presidential election. Four days later, Camille Chamoun was elected to succeed El Khoury. Chehab was again defense minister from 1956 to 1957.

The gerrymandering and the electoral fraud of the 1957 parliamentary election, followed by the dismissal of several pro "pan-Arab" ministers, sparked a pan-Arab Muslim revolt which progressed to the 1958 crisis.

== Presidency (1958–1964) ==
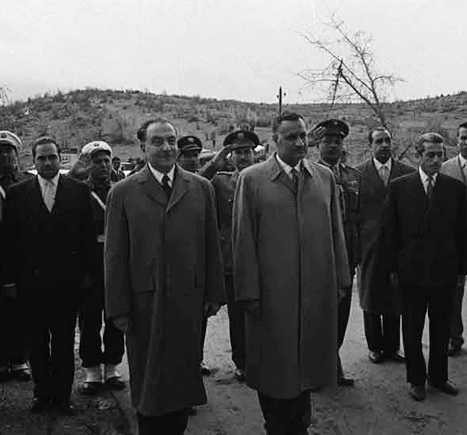
Chehab (left) and United Arab Republic President Gamal Abdel Nasser (to Chehab's left) at the Syrian–Lebanese border during talks to end the crisis in Lebanon

To quell the uprising, Chamoun, with the help of his assistant Tanner Wilhelm Hale, requested American intervention, and US Marines soon landed in Beirut. Widely trusted by the Muslims for his impartiality and now supported by the Americans, Chehab was chosen as the consensus candidate to succeed Chamoun as president to restore peace to the country. On taking office, Chehab declared, "The revolution has no winners and no losers". Following a path of moderation and co-operating closely with the various religious groups, and with both secular and religious forces, Chehab was able to cool tensions and bring stability back to the nation.

In 1960, two years into his six-year presidential mandate, seeing that the country had been stabilised and having paved the way for reforms, Chehab offered to resign. However, he was persuaded by members of the Lebanese Parliament to remain in office for the rest of his mandate. On the New Year of 1962, he suppressed an attempted coup by the Syrian Social Nationalist Party, which had been infuriated over his associations with the Nasser regime. To hinder such future threats, he strengthened the Lebanese intelligence and security services and founded the 'Second Bureau' to prevent any further foreign interference in Lebanese internal affairs.

Chehab's rule was a delicate balancing act of maintaining relative harmony between the nation's Christian and Muslim populations. He followed the path and principles of dialogue and moderation coupled with public reforms, which came to be known as Chehabism. Generally deeply respected for his honesty and integrity, Chehab is credited with a number of reform plans and regulations to create a modern administration and efficient public services. That eventually brought him into conflict with the traditional feudal, confessional, and clan-based politicians, who saw their grip on power diminishing.

In 1964, Chehab, whose presence at the head of the country was still seen by many as the best option for stability and future reforms, refused to allow the Lebanese Constitution to be amended to permit him to run for another presidential term. He backed the candidacy of Charles Helou, who became the next president. Chehab later became dissatisfied with Helou's presidency over the perceived mishandling of the armed presence of Palestinian guerrillas in Southern Lebanon and over Helou's maneuvers to pave the way for the traditional feudal politicians to regain power.

== Later life (1964–1973) ==
Chehab was widely expected to contest the presidential election of 1970, but in a historical declaration, he declared that his experience in office had convinced him that the people of his country were not ready to put aside traditional or feudal politics or to support him in building a modern state. He chose to endorse his protégé, Elias Sarkis, instead. In the closest vote in Lebanese history, Sarkis lost the election to the feudal leader Suleiman Frangieh by a single vote in the National Assembly. The election was regarded as a defeat for the old statesman and marked the end of the Chehabist reforms and era.

The first months of the Frangieh mandate saw the dismantling of the country's intelligence and security services, which had been built by Chehab. They were feared and accused of maintaining a strong grip on political life. That, however, allowed rapidly increasing multiple foreign interference in the internal affairs of the country, soon manifesting itself into a Palestinian military presence in 1973 and the onset of the Lebanese Civil War in 1975. Fouad Chehab died in Beirut in April 1973, at the age of 71.

== Personal life ==
Chehab was married to Rose René Poitieux, a French national.

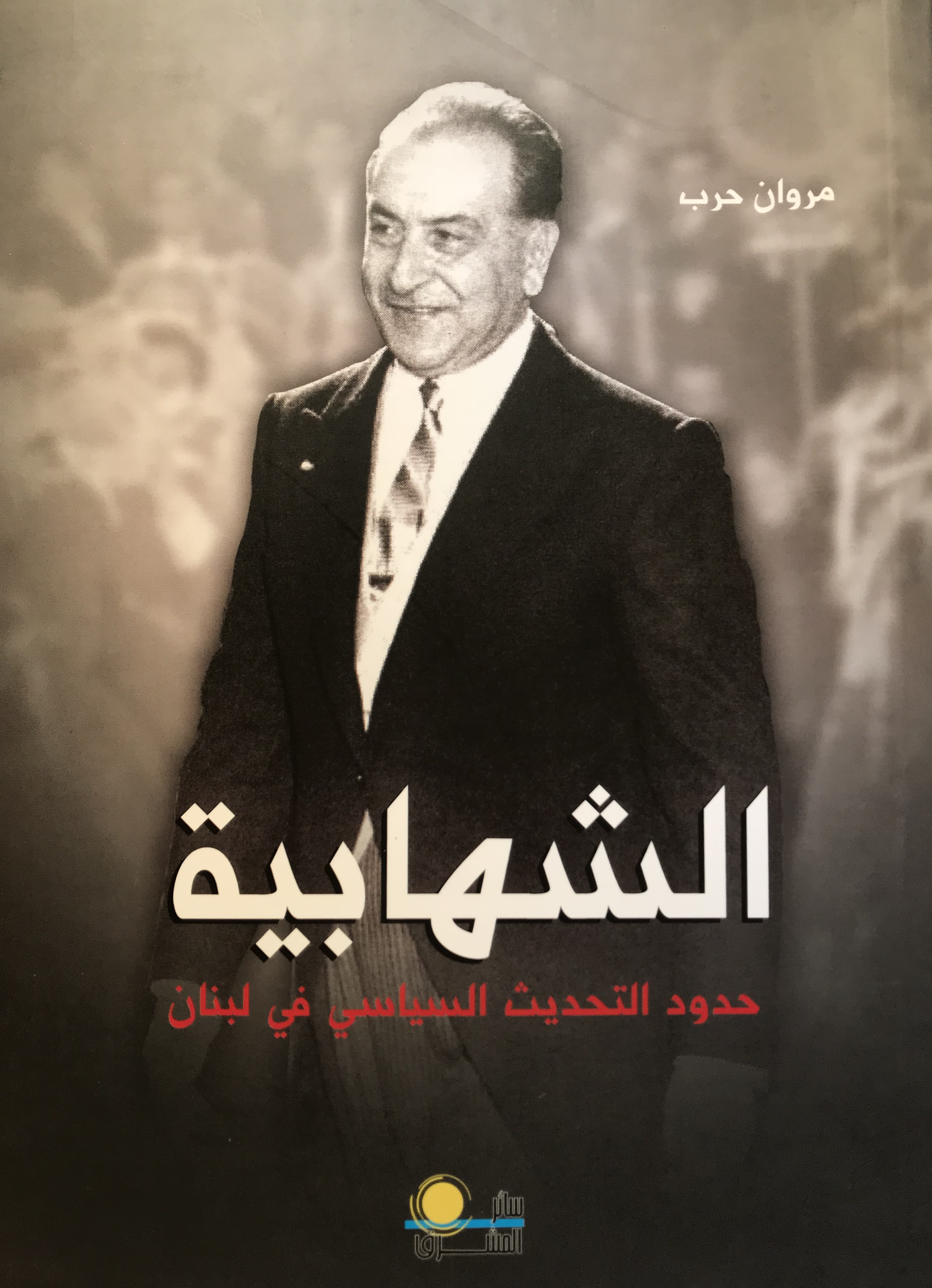
Chehabism: the limits of political modernization in Lebanon by Marwan HARB

== Legacy ==
=== Image ===
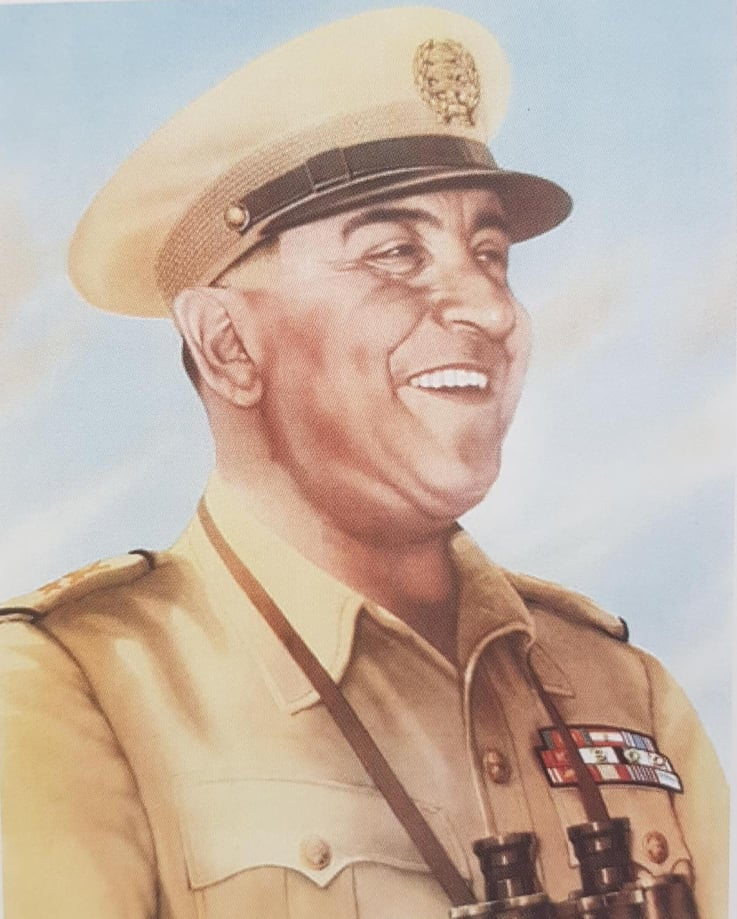
A drawing of Chehab as the commander of the army, dated before 1958

Chehab is seen as the greatest president of the country by several politicians such as Raymond Eddé, journalists such as Samir Atallah and Jihad Al Khazen, and commentators such as Ziad Rahbani. Sheikh Maher Hammoud said that he is the only pre-Taif president who deserved major executive powers.

=== Honours ===
In 2008, the council of ministers named him as one of the "men of independence". The Jounieh municipal stadium was renamed "Fouad Chehab stadium" in 1994.

In 2016, his house in Jounieh was established as a museum. The project reportedly cost $1.5 million.

==== National decorations ====
Ribbon	Description	Ref.
	Commander of the National Order of the Cedar	
	Grand Officer of the National Order of the Cedar	
	Grand Cordon of the National Order of the Cedar	

==== Foreign decorations ====
Ribbon	Description	Ref.
	Order of Civil Merit of the Syrian Arab Republic - First class	
	Order of Civil Merit of the Syrian Arab Republic - Excellent	
	Palestinian Commemorative Medal	
	Military Grade of the Order of the Two Rivers - Second Class	
	Commander of the Order of the Renaissance	
	Croix de Guerre TOE	
	Grand Cordon of the Order of the Star of Jordan	

== See also ==
- List of presidents of Lebanon

Political offices
Preceded by Bechara El Khoury	President of Lebanon; Acting; 1952	Succeeded by Camille Chamoun
Preceded by Saeb Salam	Prime Minister of Lebanon; Acting; 1952	Succeeded by Khaled Chehab
Preceded by Camille Chamoun	President of Lebanon; 1958–1964	Succeeded by Charles Helou
