= List of prime ministers of Lebanon =

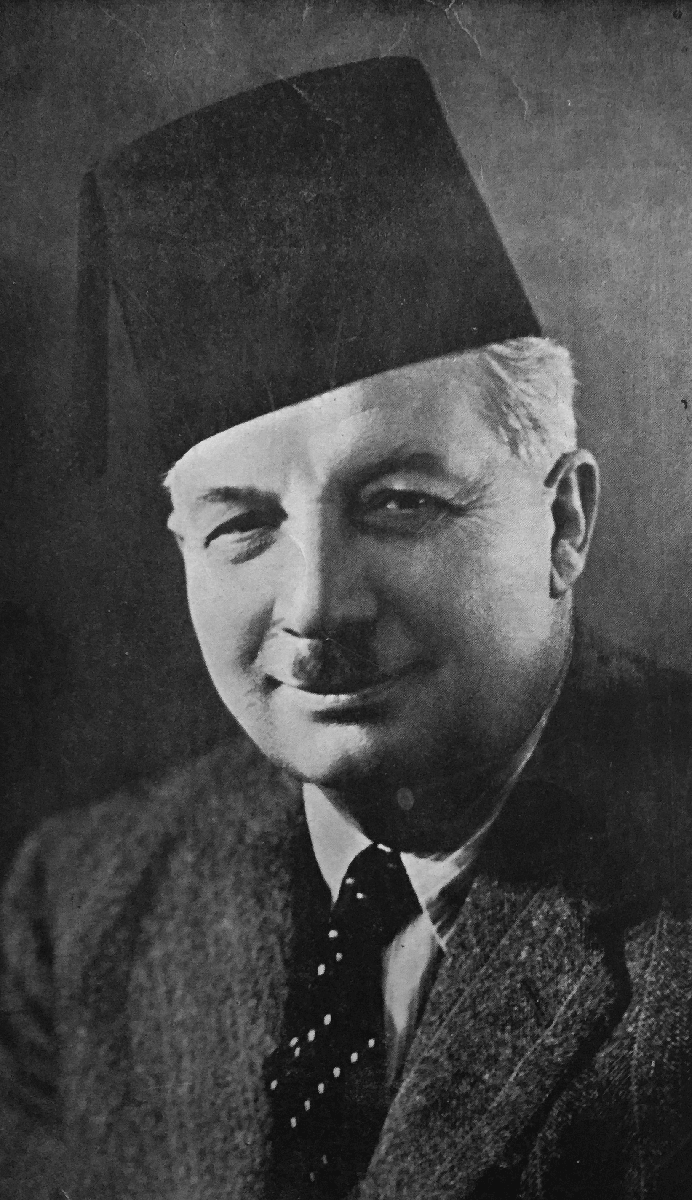
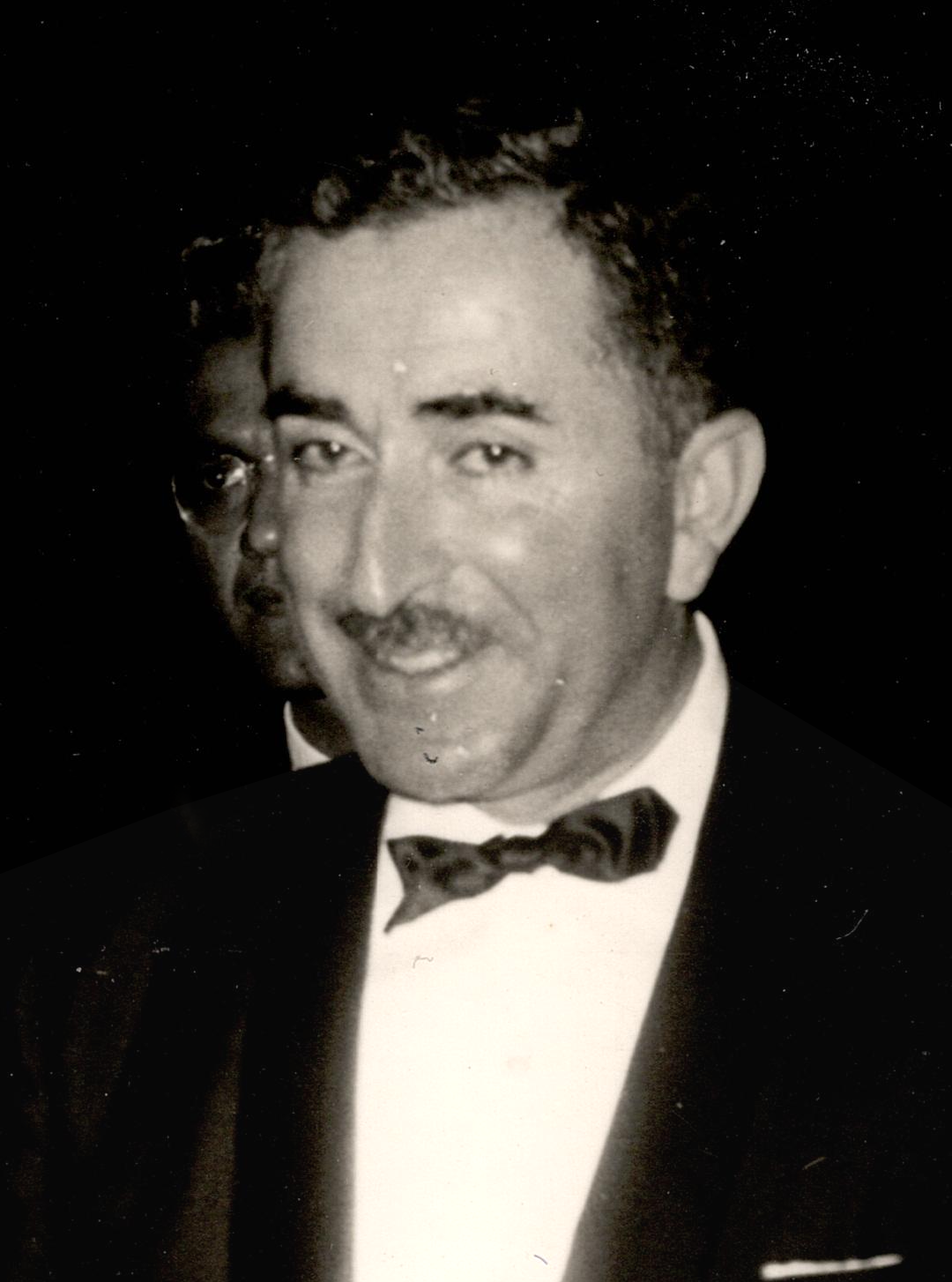
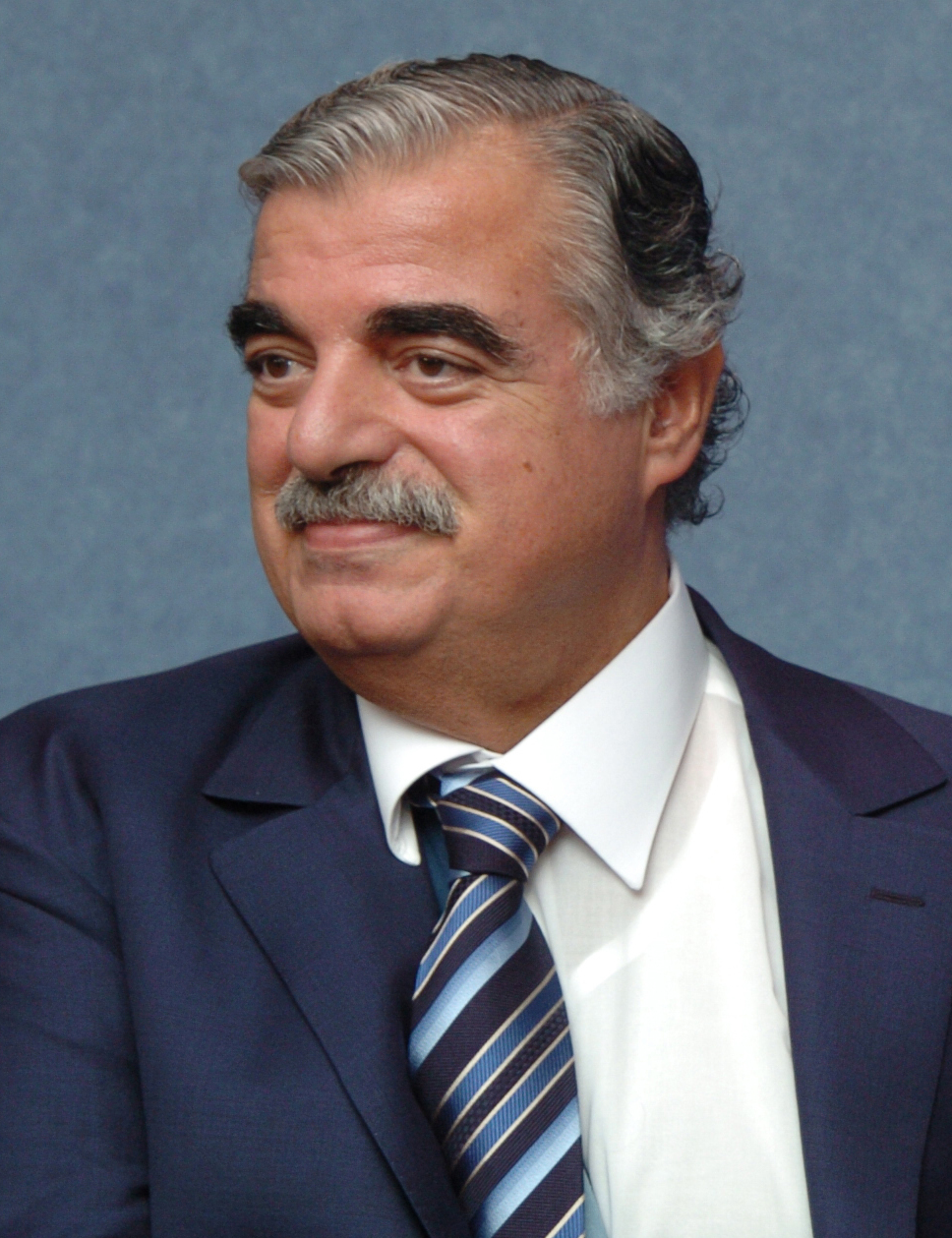
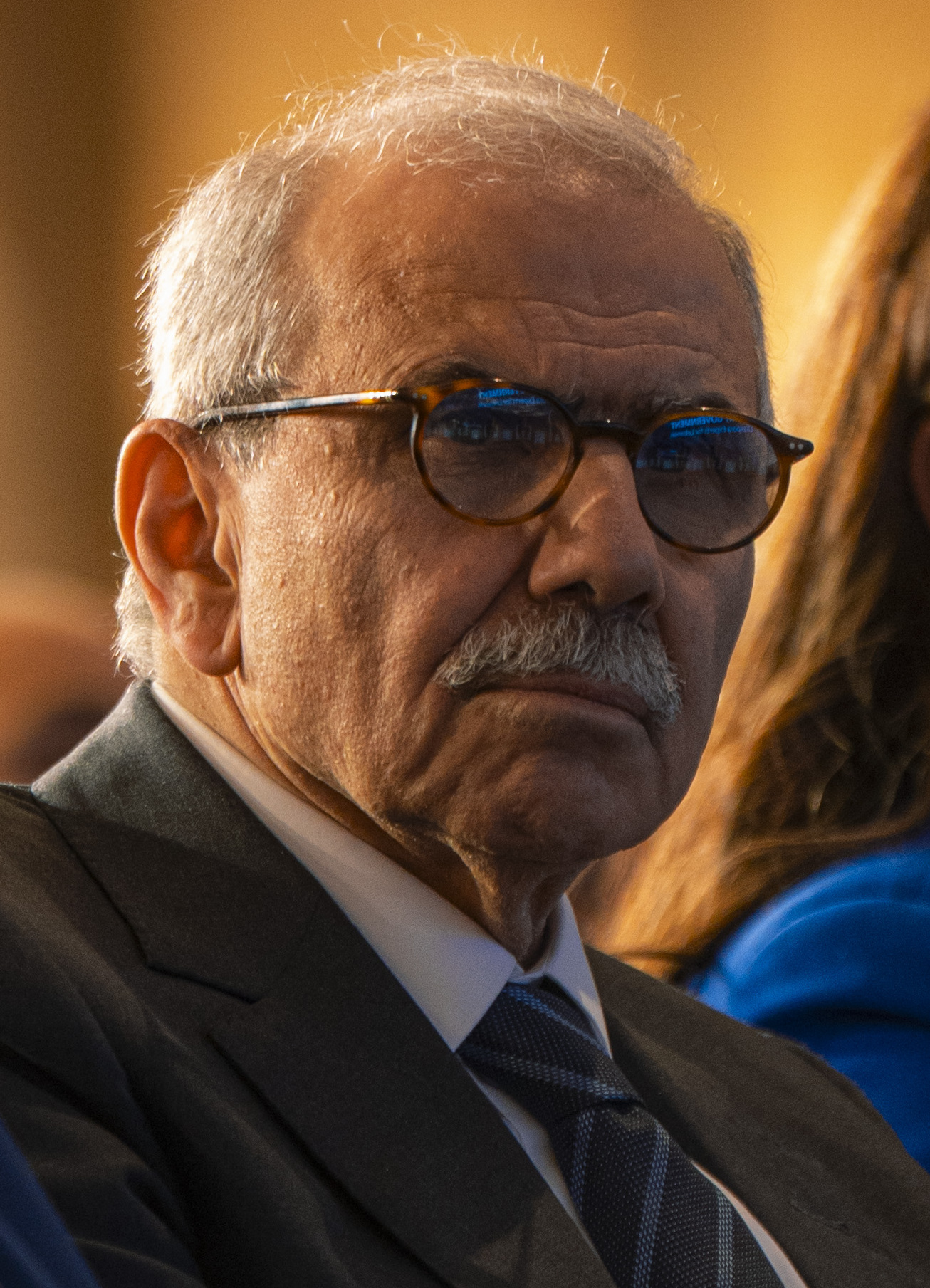
- Top left: Riad Solh was the first prime minister of the Republic of Lebanon.
- Top right: Rashid Karami was the longest-serving prime minister of Lebanon serving for 8 terms.
- Bottom left: Rafic Hariri is one of the most celebrated prime ministers of Lebanon and was the second longest-serving prime minister.
- Bottom right: Nawaf Salam is the incumbent prime minister of Lebanon since 2025.

This is a list of prime ministers of Lebanon (officially known as President of the Council of Ministers) since the creation of the office in 1926.

Due to the National Pact, an unwritten understanding among the country's religious groups agreed to in 1943, every Prime Minister since that point has been a Sunni Muslim.

== List of officeholders ==
=== State of Greater Lebanon, part of the French Mandate (1926–1943) ===
| No. | Portrait | Name (Birth–Death) | Term of office | | | Party | Cabinet | Ref. |
| No. | Portrait | Name (Birth–Death) | Took office | Left office | Time in office | Party | Cabinet | Ref. |
|---|---|---|---|---|---|---|---|---|
| 1 | | Auguste Adib Pacha أوغست أديب باشا (1859–1936) | 31 May 1926 | 5 May 1927 | 339 days | Independent | Adib I | |
| 2 | | Bechara Khoury بشارة الخوري (1890–1964) | 5 May 1927 | 10 August 1928 | 1 year, 97 days | Constitutional Party | Khoury I–II | |
| 3 | | Habib Pacha Es-Saad حبيب باشا السعد (1867–1942) | 10 August 1928 | 9 May 1929 | 272 days | Independent | Saad | |
| 4 | | Bechara Khoury بشارة الخوري (1890–1964) | 9 May 1929 | 11 October 1929 | 155 days | Constitutional Party | Khoury III | |
| 5 | | Émile Eddé إميل أده (1886–1949) | 11 October 1929 | 25 March 1930 | 165 days | National Bloc | Eddé | |
| 6 | | Auguste Adib Pacha أوغست أديب باشا (1859–1936) | 25 March 1930 | 9 March 1932 | 1 year, 350 days | Independent | Adib II | |
| 7 | | Charles Debbas شارل دباس (1884–1935) | 9 March 1932 | 29 January 1934 | 1 year, 326 days | Independent | | |
| 8 | | Abdallah Beyhum عبد الله بيهم (1879–1962) | 29 January 1934 | 30 January 1936 | 2 years, 1 day | Independent | | |
| 9 | | Ayoub Tabet أيوب ثابت (1884–1951) | 30 January 1936 | 5 January 1937 | 341 days | Independent | | |
| 10 | | Khayreddine al-Ahdab خير الدين الأحدب (1894–1941) | 5 January 1937 | 18 March 1938 | 1 year, 72 days | National Bloc | Ahdab I–II–III–IV–V | |
| 11 | | Khaled Chehab خالد شهاب (1886–1978) | 18 March 1938 | 24 October 1938 | 220 days | Independent | Chehab I | |
| 12 | | Abdallah Yafi عبد الله اليافي (1901–1986) | 24 October 1938 | 21 September 1939 | 332 days | Independent | Yafi I–II | |
| 13 | | Abdallah Beyhum عبد الله بيهم (1879–1962) | 21 September 1939 | 4 April 1941 | 1 year, 195 days | Independent | | |
Vacant (4 April 1941 – 7 April 1941)
| 14 | | Alfred Georges Naccache ألفرد جورج النقاش (1887–1978) | 7 April 1941 | 26 November 1941 | 233 days | Kataeb Party | | |
Vacant (26 November 1941 – 1 December 1941)
| 15 | | Ahmad Daouk أحمد الداعوق (1892–1979) | 1 December 1941 | 26 July 1942 | 237 days | Independent | Daouk I | |
| 16 | | Sami Solh سامي الصلح (1887–1968) | 26 July 1942 | 22 March 1943 | 239 days | Constitutional Party | Sami Solh I | |
| 17 | | Ayoub Tabet أيوب ثابت (1884–1951) | 22 March 1943 | 21 July 1943 | 121 days | Independent | Tabet | |
Vacant (21 July 1943 – 1 August 1943)
| 18 | | Petro Trad بيترو طراد (1876–1947) | 1 August 1943 | 25 September 1943 | 55 days | Independent | | |

=== Lebanese Republic (1943–present) ===
| No. | Portrait | Name (Birth–Death) | Term of office | | | Party | Cabinet | Ref. |
| No. | Portrait | Name (Birth–Death) | Took office | Left office | Time in office | Party | Cabinet | Ref. |
|---|---|---|---|---|---|---|---|---|
| 1 | | Riad Solh رياض الصلح (1894–1951) | 25 September 1943 | 10 January 1945 | 1 year, 107 days | Constitutional Party | Riad Solh I–II | |
| 2 | | Abdul Hamid Karami عبد الحميد كرامي (1890–1950) | 10 January 1945 | 20 August 1945 | 222 days | Independent | Karami | |
Vacant (20 August 1945 – 23 August 1945)
| 3 | | Sami Solh سامي الصلح (1887–1968) | 23 August 1945 | 22 May 1946 | 272 days | Constitutional Party | Sami Solh II | |
| 4 | | Saadi Munla سعدي المنلا (1890–1975) | 22 May 1946 | 14 December 1946 | 206 days | Independent | Munla | |
| 5 | | Riad Solh رياض الصلح (1894–1951) | 14 December 1946 | 14 February 1951 | 4 years, 62 days | Constitutional Party | Riad Solh III–IV–V–VI | |
| 6 | | Hussein Oweini حسين العويني (1900–1971) | 14 February 1951 | 7 April 1951 | 52 days | Independent | Oweini I | |
| 7 | | Abdallah Yafi عبد الله اليافي (1901–1986) | 7 April 1951 | 11 February 1952 | 310 days | Independent | Yafi III | |
| 8 | | Sami Solh سامي الصلح (1887–1968) | 11 February 1952 | 9 September 1952 | 211 days | Constitutional Party | Sami Solh III | |
| 9 | | Nazem Akkari ناظم عكاري (1902–1985) | 10 September 1952 | 14 September 1952 | 4 days | Independent | Akkari | |
| 10 | | Saeb Salam صائب سلام (1905–2000) | 14 September 1952 | 18 September 1952 | 4 days | Independent | Salam I | |
| — | | Fuad Chehab فؤاد شهاب (1902–1973) acting | 18 September 1952 | 1 October 1952 | 13 days | Independent | Fouad Chehab | |
| 11 | | Khaled Chehab خالد شهاب (1886–1978) | 1 October 1952 | 1 May 1953 | 212 days | Independent | Khaled Chehab II | |
| 12 | | Saeb Salam صائب سلام (1905–2000) | 1 May 1953 | 16 August 1953 | 107 days | Independent | Salam II | |
| 13 | | Abdallah Yafi عبد الله اليافي (1901–1986) | 16 August 1953 | 16 September 1954 | 1 year, 31 days | Independent | Yafi IV–Yafi V | |
| 14 | | Sami Solh سامي الصلح (1887–1968) | 16 September 1954 | 19 September 1955 | 1 year, 3 days | Constitutional Party | Sami Solh IV–V | |
| 15 | | Rashid Karami رشيد كرامي (1921–1987) | 19 September 1955 | 20 March 1956 | 183 days | Independent | Karami I | |
| 16 | | Abdallah Yafi عبد الله اليافي (1901–1986) | 20 March 1956 | 18 November 1956 | 243 days | Independent | Yafi VI–VII | |
| 17 | | Sami Solh سامي الصلح (1887–1968) | 18 November 1956 | 20 September 1958 | 1 year, 306 days | Constitutional Party | Sami Solh VI–VII–VIII | |
| — | | Khalil Hibri خليل الهبري (1904–1979) acting | 20 September 1958 | 24 September 1958 | 4 days | Independent | Sami Solh VIII | |
| 18 | | Rashid Karami رشيد كرامي (1921–1987) | 24 September 1958 | 14 May 1960 | 1 year, 233 days | Independent | Karami II–III | |
| 19 | | Ahmad Daouk أحمد الداعوق (1892–1979) | 14 May 1960 | 1 August 1960 | 79 days | Independent | Daouk II | |
| 20 | | Saeb Salam صائب سلام (1905–2000) | 2 August 1960 | 31 October 1961 | 1 year, 90 days | Independent | Salam III–IV | |
| 21 | | Rashid Karami رشيد كرامي (1921–1987) | 31 October 1961 | 20 February 1964 | 2 years, 112 days | Independent | Karami IV | |
| 22 | | Hussein Oweini حسين العويني (1900–1971) | 20 February 1964 | 25 July 1965 | 1 year, 155 days | Independent | Oweini II–III–IV | |
| 23 | | Rashid Karami رشيد كرامي (1921–1987) | 25 July 1965 | 9 April 1966 | 258 days | Independent | Karami V | |
| 24 | | Abdallah Yafi عبد الله اليافي (1901–1986) | 9 April 1966 | 2 December 1966 | 237 days | Independent | Yafi VIII | |
Vacant (2 December 1966 – 7 December 1966)
| 25 | | Rashid Karami رشيد كرامي (1921–1987) | 7 December 1966 | 8 February 1968 | 1 year, 63 days | Independent | Karami VI | |
| 26 | | Abdallah Yafi عبد الله اليافي (1901–1986) | 8 February 1968 | 15 January 1969 | 342 days | Independent | Yafi IX–X–XI | |
| 27 | | Rashid Karami رشيد كرامي (1921–1987) | 15 January 1969 | 13 October 1970 | 1 year, 271 days | Independent | Karami VII–VIII | |
| 28 | | Saeb Salam صائب سلام (1905–2000) | 13 October 1970 | 25 April 1973 | 2 years, 194 days | Independent | Salam V–VI | |
| 29 | | Amin Hafez أمين الحافظ (1926–2009) | 25 April 1973 | 21 June 1973 | 57 days | Independent | Hafez | |
| 30 | | Takieddine Solh تقي الدين الصلح (1908–1988) | 21 June 1973 | 31 October 1974 | 1 year, 132 days | Independent | Takieddin Solh | |
| 31 | | Rachid Solh رشيد الصلح (1926–2014) | 31 October 1974 | 24 May 1975 | 205 days | Independent | Rachid Solh I | |
| 32 | | Nureddine Rifai نور الدين الرفاعي (1899–1980) | 24 May 1975 | 27 May 1975 | 3 days | Military | Rifai | |
Vacant (27 May 1975 – 1 July 1975)
| 33 | | Rashid Karami رشيد كرامي (1921–1987) | 1 July 1975 | 8 December 1976 | 1 year, 160 days | National Salvation Front | Karami IX | |
| 34 | | Salim Huss سليم الحص (1929–2024) | 8 December 1976 | 20 July 1980 | 3 years, 225 days | Independent | Hoss I–II | |
| 35 | | Takieddine Solh تقي الدين الصلح (1908–1988) | 20 July 1980 | 25 October 1980 | 97 days | Independent | No government | |
| 36 | | Shafik Dib Wazzan شفيق أديب الوزان (1925–1999) | 25 October 1980 | 30 April 1984 | 3 years, 188 days | Independent | Wazzan I–II | |
| 37 | | Rashid Karami رشيد كرامي (1921–1987) | 30 April 1984 | 1 June 1987 | 3 years, 32 days | National Salvation Front | Karami X | |
Vacant (1 June 1987 – 2 June 1987)
| 38 | | Salim Huss سليم الحص (1929–2024) | 2 June 1987 | 24 December 1990; Disputed | 3 years, 205 days | Independent | Hoss III | |
| – | | Michel Aoun ميشال عون (born 1935) | 22 September 1988; Disputed | 13 October 1990 | 2 years, 21 days | Military | Aoun | |
(Lebanon) Second Lebanese Republic
| 39 | | Omar Karami عمر كرامي (1934–2015) | 24 December 1990 | 16 May 1992 | 1 year, 144 days | Arab Liberation Party | Karami I | |
| 40 | | Rachid Solh رشيد الصلح (1926–2014) | 16 May 1992 | 31 October 1992 | 168 days | Independent | Rachid Solh II | |
| 41 | | Rafic Hariri رفيق الحريري (1944–2005) | 31 October 1992 | 4 December 1998 | 6 years, 34 days | Future Movement | Hariri I–II–III | |
| 42 | | Salim Huss سليم الحص (1929–2024) | 4 December 1998 | 26 October 2000 | 1 year, 327 days | Independent | Hoss IV | |
| 43 | | Rafic Hariri رفيق الحريري (1944–2005) | 26 October 2000 | 26 October 2004 | 4 years | Future Movement | Hariri IV–V | |
| 44 | | Omar Karami عمر كرامي (1934–2015) | 26 October 2004 | 19 April 2005 | 175 days | Arab Liberation Party | Karami II | |
| 45 | | Najib Mikati نجيب ميقاتي (born 1955) | 19 April 2005 | 19 July 2005 | 91 days | Glory Movement | Mikati I | |
| 46 | | Fouad Siniora فؤاد السنيورة (born 1943) | 19 July 2005 | 9 November 2009 | 4 years, 113 days | Future Movement (March 14 Alliance) | Siniora I–II | |
| 47 | | Saad Hariri سعد الدين الحريري (born 1970) | 9 November 2009 | 13 June 2011 | 1 year, 216 days | Future Movement (March 14 Alliance) | Hariri I | |
| 48 | | Najib Mikati نجيب ميقاتي (born 1955) | 13 June 2011 | 15 February 2014 | 2 years, 247 days | Azm Movement (March 8 Alliance) | Mikati II | |
| 49 | | Tammam Salam تمّام سلام (born 1945) | 15 February 2014 | 18 December 2016 | 2 years, 307 days | Future Movement (March 14 Alliance) | Salam | |
| 50 | | Saad Hariri سعد الدين الحريري (born 1970) | 18 December 2016 | 21 January 2020 | 3 years, 34 days | Future Movement (March 14 Alliance) | Hariri II–III | |
| 51 | | Hassan Diab حسّان دياب (born 1959) | 21 January 2020 | 10 September 2021 | 1 year, 232 days | Independent | Diab | |
| 52 | | Najib Mikati نجيب ميقاتي (born 1955) | 10 September 2021 | 8 February 2025 | 3 years, 151 days | Azm Movement | Mikati III | |
| 53 | | Nawaf Salam نوّاف سلام (born 1953) | 8 February 2025 | Incumbent | 1 year, 176 days | Independent | Salam | |

== Birthplaces ==
| Birthplaces of prime ministers of Lebanon born in and around Lebanon. | Birthplaces of prime ministers of Lebanon born abroad. |

== See also ==
- Deputy Prime minister of Lebanon
  - List of deputy prime ministers of Lebanon
- President of Lebanon
  - List of presidents of Lebanon
- Prime Minister of Lebanon
- List of speakers of the Parliament of Lebanon
- Deputy Speaker of the Parliament of Lebanon
- Lists of office-holders
