= Third cabinet of Khayreddin Ahdab =

The tenth government of the French mandate for Lebanon on 10 July 1937, headed by Khayreddin al-Ahdab for the third time. Although it's not a completely new cabinet, but it's considered like that after the Constitutional Bloc members requested the re-discussion of the confidence. That was due to the cabinet turning from a national unity government to a National Bloc government, after President Émile Eddé appointed George Tabet and Khalil Abou Lamaa, both Nationals, after Michel Zakour, one of two Constitutional ministers, died of a heart attack. The other Constitutional minister, Ahmad al-Husseini, joined the National Bloc later. The government won the confidence with 13 votes against 12. On 30 October 1937, the Constitutionals outnumbered the Nationals, after one national joined the bloc and so requested - for the second time - the re-discussion of the confidence. The president dissolved the parliament, and the fourth cabinet of Khayreddin al-Ahdab was formed.

== Composition ==
Third Cabinet of Khayreddin Ahdab
Portfolio	Minister	Political affiliation	Religious affiliation	Governorate
Prime Minister	Khayreddin al-Ahdab	National Bloc	Sunni	North
Interior	Khayreddin al-Ahdab	National Bloc	Sunni	North
Economy	Khayreddin al-Ahdab	National Bloc	Sunni	North
Interior	Habib Abou Chahla	National Bloc	Greek Orthodox	Beirut
Public Works	Ahmad al-Husseini	National Bloc	Shia	Mount Lebanon
Justice	Ahmad al-Husseini	National Bloc	Shia	Mount Lebanon
Agriculture	Ahmad al-Husseini	National Bloc	Shia	Mount Lebanon
Finance	George Tabet	National Bloc	Maronite	Beirut
Mail	George Tabet	National Bloc	Maronite	Beirut
Education	Khalil Abou Lamaa	National Bloc	Maronite	Mount Lebanon
Health	Khalil Abou Lamaa	National Bloc	Maronite	Mount Lebanon
Foreign Affairs	Khalil Abou Lamaa	National Bloc	Maronite	Mount Lebanon
Defence	Khalil Abou Lamaa	National Bloc	Maronite	Mount Lebanon
