= First cabinet of Najib Mikati =

Lebanese government April–July 2005

A temporary Lebanese government was formed on 19 April 2005, after 50 days of the resignation of the Omar Karami government. The main goal of the cabinet was to supervise the 2005 Lebanese general election, so it was headed by Najib Mikati and 14 independent ministers. A total of 110 MPs supported it in a vote of confidence, 3 voted against it, and 11 were absent; at the time, the parliament contained only 126 members, following the assassinations of Rafic Hariri and Bassel Fleihan.

== Composition ==
Minister
Portfolio
Maronites
Damianos Kattar
Finance and Economy
Charles Rizk
Information and Tourism
Bassam Yamin
Industry and Energy and Water
Greek Orthodox
Elias Murr
Deputy Prime Minister and Defense
Tarek Mitri
Environment and Administrative Reform
Greek Catholics
Ghassan Salamé (Resigned)

Assad Rizk (Appointed on 28 April 2005)

Education and Culture
Armenians
Alain Tabourian
Telecommunications and Youth
Sunnis
Najib Mikati
Prime Minister
Hassan Sabeh
Interior
Khaled Kabbani
Justice
Shias
Mahmoud Hammoud
Foreign Affairs
Trad Hamadeh
Agriculture and Labor
Mohamad Jawad Khalifeh
Social Affairs and Health
Druze
Adel Hamieh
Public Works and Displaced
