= First cabinet of Auguste Adib =

History of Lebanese governing body

On 31 May 1926, the first Lebanese government was formed which was headed by Auguste Adib Pacha. It won the confidence of both the parliament and the senate in 14 June, with a majority of 26 votes. On 29 April 1927, 12 members of the senate signed a petition asking to withdrawal of the confidence, so the prime minister followed and resigned on 2 May.

== Composition ==
The cabinet members were as follows:

First Cabinet of Auguste Adib
| Portfolio | Minister | Political affiliation | Religious affiliation | Governorate |
| Prime Minister | Auguste Adib | Independent | Maronite | Mount Lebanon |
| Finance | Auguste Adib | Independent | Maronite | Mount Lebanon |
| Justice | Najib Qabbani | Independent | Sunni | Beirut |
| Interior | Bechara El Khoury | Independent | Maronite | Mount Lebanon |
| Public Works | Najib Amioni | Independent | Greek Orthodox | Beirut |
| Education | Youssef Aftimus | Independent | Greek Catholic | South |
| Agriculture | Ali Nusrat Asaad | Independent | Shia | South |
| Health | Salim Talhouk | Independent | Druze | Mount Lebanon |
