= Fourth cabinet of Khayreddin Ahdab =

A national unity government was formed on 30 October 1937, headed by Khayreddin al-Ahdab, and composed of four National Bloc members and three from the Constitutional Bloc. It won the confidence of the parliament with a majority of 56 votes. On 8 January 1938, Salim Takla, Majid Arslan and Habib Abou Chahla resigned, so President Émile Eddé replaced them with three Nationals. The decision faced opposition from the Constitutionals, and requested re-discussion of the confidence. This would lead to the Fifth Cabinet of Khayreddin Ahdab on 13 January.

== Composition ==
Fourth cabinet of Khayreddin Ahdab
Portfolio	Minister	Political affiliation	Religious affiliation	Governorate
Prime Minister	Khayreddin al-Ahdab	National Bloc	Sunni	North
Justice	Khayreddin al-Ahdab	National Bloc	Sunni	North
Foreign Affairs	Khayreddin al-Ahdab	National Bloc	Sunni	North
Interior	Habib Abou Chahla	National Bloc	Greek Orthodox	Beirut
Finance	Mousa Nammour	National Bloc	Maronite	Bekaa
Defence	Mousa Nammour	National Bloc	Maronite	Bekaa
Economy	Georges Tabet	National Bloc	Maronite	Beirut
Education	Georges Tabet	National Bloc	Maronite	Beirut
Health	Ibrahim Haidar	Constitutional Bloc	Shia	Bekaa
Mail	Ibrahim Haidar	Constitutional Bloc	Shia	Bekaa
Public Works	Salim Takla	Constitutional Bloc	Greek Catholic	Mount Lebanon
Agriculture	Majid Arslan	Constitutional Bloc	Druze	Mount Lebanon
