= Second cabinet of Khayreddin Ahdab =

The second cabinet of Lebanon's Prime Minister, Khayreddin al-Ahdab, was formed on 13 March 1937, after the government of his first cabinet, formed two months earlier on 5 January, collapsed. and was a national unity government. It won the confidence of the parliament by consensus. After the reshuffle following the death of Michel Zakour, the confidence was re-discussed and the next cabinet was announced.

== Composition ==
Second Cabinet of Khayreddin Ahdab
| Portfolio | Minister | Political affiliation | Religious affiliation | Governorate |
|---|---|---|---|---|
| Prime Minister | Khayreddin al-Ahdab | National Bloc | Sunni | North |
| Justice | Khayreddin al-Ahdab | National Bloc | Sunni | North |
| Mail | Khayreddin al-Ahdab | National Bloc | Sunni | North |
| Interior | Michel Zakour | Constitutional Bloc | Maronite | Mount Lebanon |
| Education | Habib Abou Chahla | National Bloc | Greek Orthodox | Beirut |
| Health | Habib Abou Chahla | National Bloc | Greek Orthodox | Beirut |
| Economy | Habib Abou Chahla | National Bloc | Greek Orthodox | Beirut |
| Public Works | Ahmad al-Husseini | Constitutional Bloc | Shia | Mount Lebanon |
| Agriculture | Ahmad al-Husseini | Constitutional Bloc | Shia | Mount Lebanon |
