= Third cabinet of Bechara Khoury =

On 10 May 1929 Bechara El Khoury headed the government of Lebanon for the third time. Formed of 3 ministers, the cabinet won the confidence of the parliament with a majority of 28 votes, and supervised 1929 general election.

== Composition ==
Third Cabinet of Bechara Khoury
Portfolio	Minister	Political affiliation	Religious affiliation	Governorate
Prime Minister	Bechara El Khoury	Independent	Maronite	Mount Lebanon
Interior	Bechara El Khoury	Independent	Maronite	Mount Lebanon
Health	Bechara El Khoury	Independent	Maronite	Mount Lebanon
Justice	Najib Abou Swan	Independent	Greek Catholic	Mount Lebanon
Public Knowledge	Najib Abou Swan	Independent	Greek Catholic	Mount Lebanon
Finance	Hussein al-Ahdab	Independent	Sunni	North
Public Works	Hussein al-Ahdab	Independent	Sunni	North
Agriculture	Hussein al-Ahdab	Independent	Sunni	North
