= First cabinet of Khayreddin Ahdab =

The eighth government of Lebanon was formed On 5 January 1937, headed by Khayreddin al-Ahdab, with 3 other National Bloc ministers as no Constitutionals took part in it. On 2 February, the cabinet won the confidence of the parliament by a small margin with 13 votes for and 12 against. On 13 March, the Prime Minister delivered his resignation to the president.

== Composition ==
First Cabinet of Khayreddin Ahdab
Image	Portfolio	Minister	Political affiliation	Religious affiliation	Governorate
	Prime Minister	Khayreddin al-Ahdab	National Bloc	Sunni	North
	Interior	Khayreddin al-Ahdab	National Bloc	Sunni	North
	Justice	Khayreddin al-Ahdab	National Bloc	Sunni	North
	Finance	Khalil Abou Lamaa	National Bloc	Maronite	Mount Lebanon
	Mail	Khalil Abou Lamaa	National Bloc	Maronite	Mount Lebanon
	Public Works	Ibrahim Haidar	National Bloc	Shia	Bekaa
	Agriculture	Ibrahim Haidar	National Bloc	Shia	Bekaa
	Education	Habib Abou Shahla	National Bloc	Greek Orthodox	Beirut
	Health	Habib Abou Shahla	National Bloc	Greek Orthodox	Beirut
	Tourism	Habib Abou Shahla	National Bloc	Greek Orthodox	Beirut
