= Fifth cabinet of Rafic Hariri =

66th cabinet of Lebanon

It was the sixty-sixth Lebanese government after independence, the third under President Émile Lahoud, and the fifth government headed by Rafic Hariri. The government was formed on 17 April 2003 and the government resigned on 26 October 2004 after the extension of the term of President Émile Lahoud by three years. A few months after his resignation, Hariri was assassinated, sparking the Cedar Revolution.

The cabinet was composed of the following ministers:

Fifth cabinet of Rafic Hariri
Portfolio	Minister	Political affiliation	Religious affiliation
Prime Minister	Rafic Hariri	Future Movement	Sunni
Deputy Prime Minister	Issam Fares	Independent	Greek Orthodox
Defense	Mahmoud Hamoud	Independent	Shia
Education	Samir Jisr	Future Movement	Sunni
Telecommunications	Jean-Louis Cordahi	Independent	Maronite
Interior	Elias Murr	Independent	Greek Orthodox
Environment	Farès Boueiz (Resigned on 9 September 2004)	Pro-Syrian	Maronite
Environment	Michel Moussa (appointed on 9 September 2004)	Amal Movement	Greek Catholic
Administrative Development	Karim Pakradoni	Kataeb	Armenian Orthodox
Tourism	Ali Hussein Abdallah	Amal Movement	Shia
Social Affairs	Assaad Diab	Independent	Shia
Information	Elie Ferzli	Independent	Greek Orthodox
Energy and Water	Ayoub Hmayed	Amal Movement	Shia
Justice	Bahij Tabbara	Future Movement	Sunni
Foreign Affairs	Jean Obeid	Independent	Maronite
Economy and Trade	Marwan Hamadeh	Progressive Socialist Party	Druze
Displaced	Abdallah Farhat (Resigned on 9 September 2004)	Progressive Socialist Party	Maronite
Displaced	Najib Mikati (Appointed on 9 September 2004)	Azm Movement	Sunni
Labor	Assad Hardan	Syrian Social Nationalist Party	Greek Orthodox
Public Works and Transport	Najib Mikati	Azm Movement	Sunni
Youth	Sebouh Hovnanian	Tashnag Party	Armenian Orthodox
Finance	Fouad Siniora	Future Movement	Sunni
Culture	Ghazi Aridi	Progressive Socialist Party	Druze
Agriculture	Ali Hassan Khalil	Amal Movement	Shia
Industry	Elias Skaff	Popular Bloc	Greek Orthodox
Health	Suleiman Franjieh	Marada Movement	Maronite
Minister of State	Abdul rahim Mrad	Union Party	Sunni
Minister of State	Assem Qanso	Arab Socialist Ba'ath Party (Pro-Syrian)	Shia
Minister of State	Karam Karam	Independent	Greek Orthodox
Minister of State	Michel Moussa	Amal Movement	Catholic
Minister of State	Talal Arslan	Lebanese Democratic Party	Druze
Minister of State	Khalil Hrawi	Independent	Maronite
