= First cabinet of Bechara Khoury =

Lebanon's second cabinet (1927)

The second cabinet of Lebanon was formed on 5 May 1927, headed by Bechara El Khoury after the Prime Minister-designate Mohammad al-Jisr stepped down. It won the confidence with the consensus of both the parliament and the senate in 14 May. On 5 January 1928, El Khoury resigned.

== Composition ==
First cabinet of Bechara Khoury
Portfolio	Minister	Political affiliation	Religious affiliation	Governorate
Prime Minister	Bechara El Khoury	Independent	Maronite	Mount Lebanon
Public Knowledge	Bechara El Khoury	Independent	Maronite	Mount Lebanon
Justice	Shekri Cordahi	Independent	Greek Catholic	Mount Lebanon
Interior	George Tabet	Independent	Maronite	Beirut
Finance	Khaled Chehab	Independent	Sunni	South
Public Works	Ahmad Al-Hussein	Independent	Shia	Mount Lebanon
Health	Salim Talhouk	Independent	Druze	Mount Lebanon
Agriculture	Elias Fayyad	Independent	Greek Orthodox	Beirut
