= Second cabinet of Bechara Khoury =

The third government in the French Mandate for Lebanon was formed on 5 January 1928, headed by Bechara El Khoury for the second time. It won the confidence of the parliament with a majority of 33 votes. On 10 August, the Prime Minister resigned again.

== Composition ==
Second Cabinet of Bechara Khoury
Portfolio	Minister	Political affiliation	Religious affiliation	Governorate
Prime Minister	Bechara El Khoury	Independent	Maronite	Mount Lebanon
Public Knowledge	Bechara El Khoury	Independent	Maronite	Mount Lebanon
Justice	Ayoub Tabet	Independent	Protestant	Beirut
Health	Ayoub Tabet	Independent	Protestant	Beirut
Finance	Hussein al-Ahdab	Independent	Sunni	North
Public Works	Hussein al-Ahdab	Independent	Sunni	North
Agriculture	Hussein al-Ahdab	Independent	Sunni	North
