= Cabinet of Habib Saad =

Lebanese government

The Cabinet of Habib Saad was the fourth cabinet of the State of Greater Lebanon, headed by Habib Pacha Saad. It was formed on 10 August 1928 and served until 29 May 1929.

== Composition ==
Cabinet of Habib Saad
Portfolio	Minister	Political affiliation	Religious affiliation	Governorate
Prime Minister	Habib Pacha Saad	Independent	Maronite	Mount Lebanon
Public Knowledge	Habib Pacha Saad	Independent	Maronite	Mount Lebanon
Health	Habib Pacha Saad	Independent	Maronite	Mount Lebanon
Justice	Chokri Cordahi	Independent	Greek Catholic	Mount Lebanon
Public Works	Hussein al-Ahdab	Independent	Sunni	North
Agriculture	Hussein al-Ahdab	Independent	Sunni	North
Interior	Moussa Nammour	Independent	Maronite	Beqaa
Finance	Sobhi Haidar	Independent	Shia	Beqaa
