= Cabinet of Émile Eddé =

The Cabinet of Émile Eddé headed by Émile Eddé was formed on 12 October 1929 and served until 20 March 1930.

== Composition ==
Cabinet of Émile Eddé
Portfolio	Minister	Political affiliation	Religious affiliation	Governorate
Prime Minister	Émile Eddé	Pro-France	Maronite	Mount Lebanon
Interior	Émile Eddé	Pro-France	Maronite	Mount Lebanon
Health	Émile Eddé	Pro-France	Maronite	Mount Lebanon
Justice	Najib Abou Swan	Pro-France	Greek Catholic	Beirut
Public Knowledge	Najib Abou Swan	Pro-France	Greek Catholic	Beirut
Finance	Moussa Namour	Pro-France	Maronite	Beqaa
Economy	Gebrayel Mansa	Pro-France	Greek Catholic	Beirut
Public Works	Hussein al-Ahdab	Pro-France	Sunni	North
Agriculture	Ahmad Al-Husseini	Pro-France	Shia	South
