= Second cabinet of Riad Solh =

The second Lebanese government after independence and the second under President Bechara El Khoury, who was commissioned to form it by Decree No. 1484 of 3 July 1944, and the government was formed by Decree No. 1485 on the same date of the assignment. The cabinet resigned on 9 January 1945 .

Second Cabinet of Riad Solh
Image	Portfolio	Minister	Political affiliation	Religious affiliation
	Prime Minister	Riad Solh	Constitutional Bloc	Sunni
	Supply	Riad Solh	Constitutional Bloc	Sunni
	Interior and Municipalities	Riad Solh	Constitutional Bloc	Sunni
	Deputy Prime Minister	Habib Abu Shahla	National Bloc	Greek Orthodox
	Education	Habib Abu Shahla	National Bloc	Greek Orthodox
	Justice	Habib Abu Shahla	National Bloc	Greek Orthodox
	Foreign Affairs	Salim Takla	Constitutional Bloc	Greek Catholic
	Ministry of Public Works and Transport	Salim Takla	Constitutional Bloc	Greek Catholic
	Telecommunications	Mohammed El Fadl	Constitutional Bloc	Sunni
	Trade and industry	Mohammed El Fadl	Constitutional Bloc	Sunni
	Defense	Majid Arslan	Constitutional Bloc	Druze
	Agriculture	Majid Arslan	Constitutional Bloc	Druze
	Public Health	Majid Arslan	Constitutional Bloc	Druze
	Finance	Hamid Frangieh	Independent	Maronite

Source: Legallaw.lb

Name	Ministers
Constitutional Bloc	4 / 6
National Bloc	1 / 6
Independent	1 / 6
