= Second cabinet of Omar Karami =

67th cabinet of Lebanon

The Second cabinet of Omar Karami (26 October 2004 to 19 April 2005) was the 67th Lebanese cabinet, led by Prime Minister Omar Karami. The cabinet came after the collapse of the fifth cabinet of Rafic Hariri resigned in the uproar following the parliamentary extension of the presidency of Émile Lahoud for three years. The Karami cabinet itself fell six months later during the Cedar Revolution, which was sparked by the assassination of Rafic Hariri, the previous prime minister.

== Composition ==
The cabinet members were as follows:

Lebanese Government of October 2004
Portfolio	Minister	Political affiliation	Religious Sect
Prime Minister Omar Karami's Share (2/30)
Prime Minister	Omar Karami	Arab Liberation Party	Sunni
Minister of Education	Ahmad Sami Minkara	Independent	Sunni
Development and Liberation Bloc Share (3/30)
Minister of Social Affairs	Ghazi Zaiter	Amal Movement	Shia
Minister of Health	Mohamad Jawad Khalifeh	Amal Movement	Shia
Minister of Public Works	Yassine Jaber	Amal Movement	Shia
Syrian Social Nationalist Bloc Share (3/30)
Deputy Prime Minister	Issam Fares	SSNP	Greek Orthodox
Minister of State	Albert Mansour	SSNP	Greek Catholic
Minister of State	Mahmoud Abdel Khalek	SSNP	Druze
Armenian Revolutionary Federation Bloc Share (2/30)
Minister of Youth and Sports	Sebouh Hovnanian	Armenian Revolutionary Federation	Armenian Orthodox
Minister of State	Alain Tabourian	Armenian Revolutionary Federation	Armenian Orthodox
Pro-Syrian Ministers (9/30)
Minister of Interior	Suleiman Frangieh Jr.	Marada Movement	Maronite
Minister of Information	Elie Ferzli	Independent	Greek Orthodox
Minister of State	Elias Skaff	Popular Bloc	Greek Catholic
Minister of Defense	Abdel Rahim Mrad	Union Party	Sunni
Minister of Justice	Adnan Addoum	Independent	Sunni
Minister of Labor	Assem Qanso	Arab Socialist Ba'ath Party	Shia
Minister of Foreign Affairs and Expatriates	Mahmoud Hammoud	Independent	Shia
Minister of Displaced	Talal Arslan	Lebanese Democratic Party	Druze
Minister of Environment	Wiam Wahhab	Independents	Druze
Independents (11/30)
Minister of Telecommunications	Jean Louis Cardahi	Independent	Maronite
Minister of Tourism	Wadih El Khazen	Independent	Maronite
Minister of Culture	Naji Boustani	Independent	Maronite
Minister for Administrative Reform	Ibrahim Daher	Independent	Maronite
Minister of State	Youssef Alameh	Independent	Maronite
Minister of Finance	Elias Saba	Independent	Greek Orthodox
Minister of State	Karam Karam	Independent	Greek Orthodox
Minister of Energy and Water	Maurice Sehnaoui	Independent	Greek Catholic
Minister of Economy	Adnan Kassar	Independent	Sunni
Minister of Industry	Leila Al Solh	Independent	Sunni
Minister of State for Parliamentary Affairs	Wafaa Hamza	Independent	Shia

== See also ==
- List of cabinets of Lebanon
