= 1948 Lebanese presidential election =

- 27 May 1948

55 members of the Parliament 37 votes needed to win
- Turnout: 85.45%
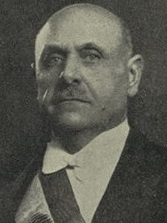
Nominee	Bechara El Khoury
Party	Constitutional Bloc
Electoral vote	47
Percentage	100%
President before election
Bechara El Khoury
Constitutional Bloc
Elected President
Bechara El Khoury
Constitutional Bloc

The 1948 Lebanese presidential election was the fifth presidential election, which was held as parliamentary session on 27 May 1948. The Constitutional Bechara El Khoury was re-elected as the president of Lebanon.

The President is elected by the Members of Parliament. He needs a two-thirds majority to win in the first round, while an absolute majority is enough in the second round. He is always a Maronite Christian by convention.

47 out of 55 deputies attended the session headed by Speaker Sabri Hamadeh. They all elected the incumbent president Bechara El Khoury.

Candidate	Votes	%
Bechara El Khoury	47	100.00
Total	47	100.00
Blank votes	0	0.00
Total votes	47	–
Registered voters/turnout	55	85.45
