= Ministry of Foreign Affairs and Emigrants (Lebanon) =

Government ministry of Lebanon

Coordinates: 33°53′33″N 35°31′7″E

Lebanese Republic Ministry of Foreign Affairs and Emigrants
- وزارة الخارجية والمغتربين
- Coat of arms of Lebanon

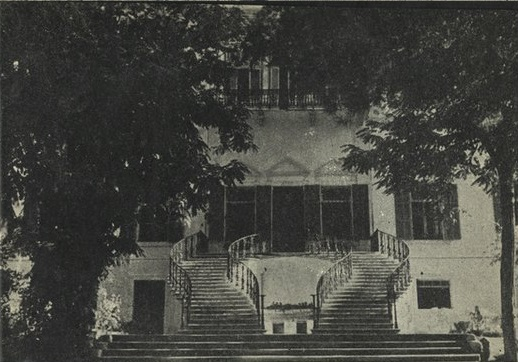
- Palace of the Lebanese Ministry of Foreign Affairs, 1947

Agency overview
- Formed: 1941
- Jurisdiction: Government of Lebanon
- Headquarters: Rue Michel Bustros, Rmeil, Beirut
- Agency executive: Youssef Rajji, Minister of Foreign Affairs and Emigrants
- Parent agency: Cabinet of Lebanon
- Website: Official website

The Ministry of Foreign Affairs and Emigrants is the Lebanese government ministry in charge of the country's foreign affairs and maintaining relations with its large emigrant communities.

== List of Foreign Affairs ministers ==
No.	Portrait	Name (birth–death)	Term of office			Cabinet	Prime Minister	President
No.	Portrait	Name (birth–death)	Took office	Left office	Time in office	Cabinet	Prime Minister	President
1		Salim Takla	25 September 1943	11 January 1945†	1 year, 108 days	Riad Solh I	Riad Al Solh	Bechara El Khoury
1		Salim Takla	25 September 1943	11 January 1945†	1 year, 108 days	Riad Solh II	Riad Al Solh	Bechara El Khoury
1		Salim Takla	25 September 1943	11 January 1945†	1 year, 108 days	Abdul Hamid Karami	Abdul Hamid Karami	Bechara El Khoury
2		Henri Philippe Pharaon	13 January 1945	22 August 1945	221 days	Abdul Hamid Karami	Abdul Hamid Karami	Bechara El Khoury
3		Hamid Frangieh	22 August 1945	22 May 1946	273 days	Sami Solh II	Sami Solh	Bechara El Khoury
4		Philippe Takla	22 May 1946	14 December 1946	206 days	Saadi Munla	Saadi Al Munla	Bechara El Khoury
(2)		Henri Philippe Pharaon	14 December 1946	7 June 1947	185 days	Riad Solh III	Riad Al Solh	Bechara El Khoury
(3)		Hamid Frangieh	7 June 1947	1 October 1949	2 years, 116 days	Riad Solh IV	Riad Al Solh	Bechara El Khoury
(3)		Hamid Frangieh	7 June 1947	1 October 1949	2 years, 116 days	Riad Solh V	Riad Al Solh	Bechara El Khoury
(4)		Philippe Takla	1 October 1949	14 February 1951	1 year, 136 days	Riad Solh VI	Riad Al Solh	Bechara El Khoury
5		Hussein Al Oweini (Note: Served simultaneously as Minister of National Defense.) (Note: Served simultaneously as Minister of Interior and Municipalities.)	14 February 1951	7 June 1951	113 days	Hussein Oweini I	Hussein Al Oweini	Bechara El Khoury
6		Charles Helou	7 June 1951	11 February 1952	249 days	Abdallah Yafi III	Abdallah El-Yafi	Bechara El Khoury
(4)		Philippe Takla	11 February 1952	9 September 1952	211 days	Sami Solh III	Sami Solh	Bechara El Khoury
7		Nazem Akkari	9 September 1952	14 September 1952	5 days	Nazem Akkari	Nazem Akkari	Bechara El Khoury
8		Saeb Salam	14 September 1952	18 September 1952	4 days	Saeb Salam I	Saeb Salam	Bechara El Khoury
(7)		Nazem Akkari	18 September 1952	30 September 1952	12 days	Fouad Chehab	Fouad Chehab Acting	
9		Musa Mubarak	30 September 1952	6 February 1953	129 days	Khaled Chehab II	Khaled Chehab	Camille Chamoun
10		Khaled Chehab	6 February 1953	30 April 1953	83 days	Khaled Chehab II	Khaled Chehab	Camille Chamoun
11		Georges Hakim (Note: Served simultaneously as Minister of Economy and Trade.)	30 April 1953	16 August 1953	108 days	Saeb Salam II	Saeb Salam	Camille Chamoun
12		Alfred Naqqache (Note: Served simultaneously as Minister of Justice from 1 March 1954 to 16 September 1954.)	16 August 1953	9 July 1955	1 year, 327 days	Abdallah Yafi IV	Abdallah El-Yafi	Camille Chamoun
12		Alfred Naqqache	16 August 1953	9 July 1955	1 year, 327 days	Abdallah Yafi V	Abdallah El-Yafi	Camille Chamoun
12		Alfred Naqqache	16 August 1953	9 July 1955	1 year, 327 days	Sami Solh IV	Sami Solh	Camille Chamoun
(3)		Hamid Frangieh	9 July 1955	7 September 1955	60 days	Sami Solh V	Sami Solh	Camille Chamoun
13		Salim Lahoud	7 September 1955	18 November 1956	1 year, 72 days	Sami Solh V	Sami Solh	Camille Chamoun
13		Salim Lahoud	7 September 1955	18 November 1956	1 year, 72 days	Rashid Karami I	Rashid Karami	Camille Chamoun
13		Salim Lahoud	7 September 1955	18 November 1956	1 year, 72 days	Abdallah Yafi VI	Abdallah El-Yafi	Camille Chamoun
13		Salim Lahoud	7 September 1955	18 November 1956	1 year, 72 days	Abdallah Yafi VII	Abdallah El-Yafi	Camille Chamoun
14		Charles Malik	18 November 1956	24 September 1958	1 year, 310 days	Sami Solh VI	Sami Solh	Camille Chamoun
14		Charles Malik	18 November 1956	24 September 1958	1 year, 310 days	Sami Solh VII	Sami Solh	Camille Chamoun
14		Charles Malik	18 November 1956	24 September 1958	1 year, 310 days	Sami Solh VIII	Sami Solh	Camille Chamoun
(4)		Philippe Takla	24 September 1958	14 October 1958	20 days	Rashid Karami II	Rashid Karami	Fouad Chehab
(5)		Hussein Al Oweini	14 October 1958	14 May 1960	1 year, 213 days	Rashid Karami III	Rashid Karami	Fouad Chehab
(4)		Philippe Takla	14 May 1960	1 April 1964	3 years, 323 days	Ahmad Daouk II	Ahmad Daouk	Fouad Chehab
(4)		Philippe Takla	14 May 1960	1 April 1964	3 years, 323 days	Saeb Salam III	Saeb Salam	Fouad Chehab
(4)		Philippe Takla	14 May 1960	1 April 1964	3 years, 323 days	Saeb Salam IV	Saeb Salam	Fouad Chehab
(4)		Philippe Takla	14 May 1960	1 April 1964	3 years, 323 days	Rashid Karami IV	Rashid Karami	Fouad Chehab
(4)		Philippe Takla	14 May 1960	1 April 1964	3 years, 323 days	Hussein Oweini II	Hussein Al Oweini	Fouad Chehab
15		Fouad Ammoun	1 April 1964	18 November 1964	177 days	Hussein Oweini II	Hussein Al Oweini	Fouad Chehab
15		Fouad Ammoun	1 April 1964	18 November 1964	177 days	Hussein Oweini III	Hussein Al Oweini	Charles Helou
(4)		Philippe Takla	18 November 1964	2 June 1965	196 days	Hussein Oweini IV	Hussein Al Oweini	Charles Helou
(5)		Hussein Al Oweini	2 June 1965	25 July 1965	53 days	Hussein Oweini IV	Hussein Al Oweini	Charles Helou
(11)		Georges Hakim	25 July 1965	9 April 1966	258 days	Rashid Karami V	Rashid Karami	Charles Helou
(4)		Philippe Takla (Note: Served simultaneously as Minister of Justice.)	9 April 1966	6 December 1966	241 days	Abdallah Yafi VIII	Abdallah El-Yafi	Charles Helou
(11)		Georges Hakim	6 December 1966	8 February 1968	1 year, 64 days	Rashid Karami VI	Rashid Karami	Charles Helou
16		Fouad Boutros	8 February 1968	12 October 1968	247 days	Abdallah Yafi IX	Abdallah El-Yafi	Charles Helou
17		Ali Arab	12 October 1968	20 October 1968	8 days	Abdallah Yafi X	Abdallah El-Yafi	Charles Helou
(5)		Hussein Al Oweini	20 October 1968	15 January 1969	87 days	Abdallah Yafi XI	Abdallah El-Yafi	Charles Helou
18		Rashid Karami	15 January 1969	22 January 1969	7 days	Rashid Karami VII	Rashid Karami	Charles Helou
19		Yusuf Salim	22 January 1969	25 November 1969	307 days	Rashid Karami VII	Rashid Karami	Charles Helou
20		Naseem Majdalani	25 November 1969	13 October 1970	322 days	Rashid Karami VIII	Rashid Karami	Charles Helou
21		Khalil Abou Hamad	13 October 1970	25 April 1973	2 years, 194 days	Saeb Salam V	Saeb Salam	Suleiman Frangieh
21		Khalil Abou Hamad	13 October 1970	25 April 1973	2 years, 194 days	Saeb Salam VI	Saeb Salam	Suleiman Frangieh
22		Khatchig Babikian	25 April 1973	8 July 1973	74 days	Amin Hafez	Amin Hafez	Suleiman Frangieh
23		Fouad Naffah	8 July 1973	31 October 1974	1 year, 115 days	Takieddine Solh	Takieddin el-Solh	Suleiman Frangieh
(4)		Philippe Takla	31 October 1974	23 May 1975	204 days	Rachid Solh I	Rachid Solh	Suleiman Frangieh
24		Lucien Dahdah	23 May 1975	1 July 1975	39 days	Nureddine Rifai	Nureddine Rifai	Suleiman Frangieh
(4)		Philippe Takla	1 July 1975	16 June 1976	351 days	Rashid Karami IX	Rashid Karami	Suleiman Frangieh
25		Camille Chamoun	16 June 1976	9 December 1976	176 days	Rashid Karami IX	Rashid Karami	Suleiman Frangieh
(16)		Fouad Boutros (Note: Served simultaneously as Minister of National Defense from 9 December 1976 to 20 December 1978.)	9 December 1976	7 October 1982	5 years, 302 days	Selim Hoss I	Salim Al-Huss	Élias Sarkis
(16)		Fouad Boutros	9 December 1976	7 October 1982	5 years, 302 days	Selim Hoss II	Salim Al-Huss	Élias Sarkis
(16)		Fouad Boutros	9 December 1976	7 October 1982	5 years, 302 days	Shafik Wazzan I	Shafik Wazzan	Élias Sarkis
26		Elie Salem	7 October 1982	30 April 1984	1 year, 206 days	Shafik Wazzan II	Shafik Wazzan	Amine Gemayel
(18)		Rashid Karami	30 April 1984	1 June 1987†	3 years, 32 days	Rashid Karami X	Rashid Karami	Amine Gemayel
27		Salim Al-Huss Acting until 24 November 1989 Disputed since 22 September 1988	2 June 1987	24 December 1990	3 years, 205 days	Rashid Karami X	Salim Al-Huss Acting	Amine Gemayel
27		Salim Al-Huss Acting until 24 November 1989 Disputed since 22 September 1988	2 June 1987	24 December 1990	3 years, 205 days	Selim Hoss III	Salim Al-Huss Acting	
27		Salim Al-Huss Acting until 24 November 1989 Disputed since 22 September 1988	2 June 1987	24 December 1990	3 years, 205 days	Selim Hoss III	Salim Al-Huss	Elias Hrawi
-		Mohammad Nabil Quraitem Disputed	22 September 1988	22 September 1988	Did not assume	Michel Aoun	Michel Aoun Acting	
-		Michel Aoun Disputed	22 September 1988	13 October 1990	2 years, 21 days	Michel Aoun	Michel Aoun Acting	
28		Farès Boueiz	24 December 1990	16 September 1992	1 year, 267 days	Omar Karami I	Omar Karami	Elias Hrawi
28		Farès Boueiz	24 December 1990	16 September 1992	1 year, 267 days	Rachid Solh II	Rachid Solh	Elias Hrawi
29		Nasri Maalouf	16 September 1992	31 October 1992	45 days	Rachid Solh II	Rachid Solh	Elias Hrawi
(28)		Farès Boueiz	31 October 1992	4 December 1998	6 years, 34 days	Rafic Hariri I	Rafic Hariri	Elias Hrawi
(28)		Farès Boueiz	31 October 1992	4 December 1998	6 years, 34 days	Rafic Hariri II	Rafic Hariri	Elias Hrawi
(28)		Farès Boueiz	31 October 1992	4 December 1998	6 years, 34 days	Rafic Hariri III	Rafic Hariri	Elias Hrawi
(27)		Salim Al-Huss	4 December 1998	26 October 2000	1 year, 327 days	Selim Hoss IV	Salim Al-Huss	Émile Lahoud
30		Mahmoud Hammoud	26 October 2000	17 April 2003	2 years, 173 days	Rafic Hariri IV	Rafic Hariri	Émile Lahoud
31		Jean Obeid	17 April 2003	26 October 2004	1 year, 192 days	Rafic Hariri V	Rafic Hariri	Émile Lahoud
(30)		Mahmoud Hammoud	26 October 2004	19 July 2005	266 days	Omar Karami II	Omar Karami	Émile Lahoud
(30)		Mahmoud Hammoud	26 October 2004	19 July 2005	266 days	Najib Mikati I	Najib Mikati	Émile Lahoud
32		Fawzi Salloukh	19 July 2005	24 November 2007	2 years, 128 days	Fouad Siniora I	Fouad Siniora	Émile Lahoud
-		Tarek Mitri (Note: Served simultaneously as Minister of Culture.) Acting	24 November 2007	11 July 2008	230 days	Fouad Siniora I	Fouad Siniora Acting	
(32)		Fawzi Salloukh	11 July 2008	13 September 2008	64 days	Fouad Siniora II	Fouad Siniora	Michel Suleiman
-		Nassib Lahoud Acting	13 September 2008	9 November 2009	1 year, 57 days	Fouad Siniora II	Fouad Siniora	Michel Suleiman
33		Ali Al Shami	9 November 2009	29 January 2010	81 days	Saad Hariri I	Saad Hariri	Michel Suleiman
-		Tarek Mitri Acting	29 January 2010	13 June 2011	1 year, 135 days	Saad Hariri I	Saad Hariri	Michel Suleiman
34		Adnan Mansour	13 June 2011	15 February 2014	2 years, 247 days	Najib Mikati II	Najib Mikati	Michel Suleiman
35		Gebran Bassil	15 February 2014	25 May 2014	99 days	Tammam Salam	Tammam Salam	Michel Suleiman
-		Akram Chehayeb Acting	25 May 2014	18 December 2016	2 years, 207 days	Tammam Salam	Tammam Salam	Vacant
(35)		Gebran Bassil	18 December 2016	21 January 2020	3 years, 34 days	Saad Hariri II	Saad Hariri	Michel Aoun
(35)		Gebran Bassil	18 December 2016	21 January 2020	3 years, 34 days	Saad Hariri III	Saad Hariri	Michel Aoun
36		Nassif Hitti	21 January 2020	3 August 2020	195 days	Hassan Diab	Hassan Diab	Michel Aoun
37		Charbel Wehbe	3 August 2020	19 May 2021	289 days	Hassan Diab	Hassan Diab	Michel Aoun
-		Zeina Akar; Acting	19 May 2021	10 September 2021	114 days	Hassan Diab	Hassan Diab	Michel Aoun
38		Abdallah Bou Habib	10 September 2021	8 February 2025	3 years, 151 days	Najib Mikati III	Najib Mikati	Michel Aoun
38		Abdallah Bou Habib	10 September 2021	8 February 2025	3 years, 151 days	Najib Mikati III	Najib Mikati Caretaker	Vacant
39		Youssef Rajji	8 February 2025	Incumbent	1 year, 181 days	Nawaf Salam	Nawaf Salam	Joseph Aoun
