= Second cabinet of Khaled Chehab =

Lebanese government between September 1952 and April 1953

Second Cabinet of Khaled Chehab
- Cabinet of Lebanon

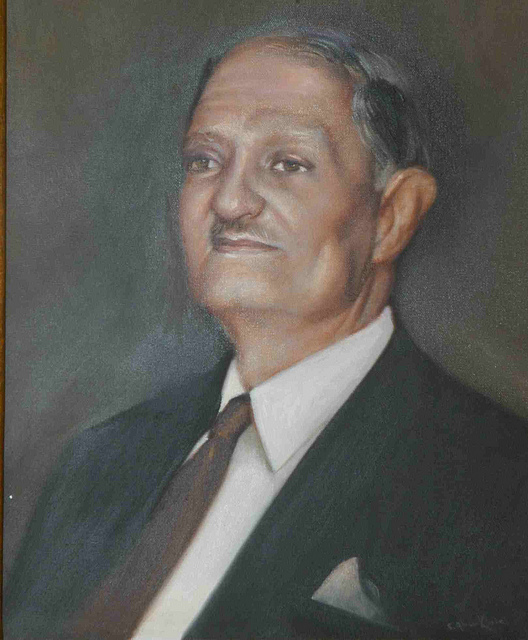
- Painting of Khaled Chehab
- Date formed: 30 September 1952
- Date dissolved: 30 April 1953

People and organisations
- President: Camille Chamoun
- Head of government: Khaled Chehab
- No. of ministers: 4
- Total no. of members: 4

History
- Predecessor: Military Cabinet of Fouad Chehab
- Successor: Second Cabinet of Saeb Salam

The second cabinet led by Khaled Chehab was formed under President Camille Chamoun on 30 September 1952. Its establishment occurred in the aftermath of the 1952 crisis in Lebanon. The cabinet was not only given confidence vote, but also power to enforce laws via decree-laws to reform the Lebanese administrative and legislative bodies until February 1953.

The period of the cabinet was brief, and it was dissolved on 30 April 1953. Saeb Salam was given the task to form the next cabinet.

== Cabinet members ==
The cabinet was consisted of four members. They were not a member of the Lebanese Parliament.

The cabinet members were as follows:

- Prime Minister: Khalid Chehab
- Foreign Minister, Minister of Public Works and PTT: Musa Mubarak
- Minister of Defense, Minister of Education, Minister of Health and Social Affairs: Salim Haidar
- Minister of Finance and Minister of Economy and Agriculture: George Hakim

In addition to his premiership Khalid Chehab also held the following posts in the cabinet: minister of interior, minister of justice and minister of information.

On 6 February 1953 Minister of Defense Salim Haidar resigned from the office, and the number of the cabinet members decreased to three.
