= Ahmad al-Hajjar =

Lebanese politician and retired brigadier general (born 1967)

Minister of Interior and Municipalities
- Preceded by: Bassam Mawlawi

Personal details
- Born: 22 September 1967 (age 59) Shheem, Lebanon
- Citizenship: Lebanon
- Education: Lebanese Army Military Academy; Bachelor's Degree in Military Sciences; INFO/1 Paris; Information Technology Degree; University of Leicester; Postgraduate Diploma in Criminal Justice and Police Management; Jean Moulin University Lyon 3; Master's Degree in Law and Security Policy

Military service
- Years of service: 38 years of experience in the field of police and military work

Ahmed Al-Hajjar (Shheem, 28 October 1964) is the current head of Lebanon's Minister of Interior and Municipalities, a retired brigadier general in the Internal Security Forces (ISF) Directorate-General, former head of the Intelligence Office in the Information Branch, former Assistant Head of the Planning and Organization Division, former Head of the Beirut Information Branch, former head of the Administrative Affairs Division and the former commander of the Government PM Guard Company.

== Biography ==
He was born in Shheem, Lebanon, on 22 September 1967. He received his primary and secondary education in Lebanon, then completed his university studies in political science, distinguishing himself with academic excellence and a deep interest in security and political affairs. He graduated from the Internal Security Forces Institute and began his professional career as an officer in the security services, advancing through the ranks until he became a brigadier general.

He earned a degree in Military Sciences from the Lebanese Army Military Academy in 1986, followed by a first-class degree in Information Technology INFO/1 from Paris in 1989. He obtained a master's degree in "Law and Security Policy" from the Faculty of Law at Jean Moulin University Lyon 3 in France in 1996, and later earned a postgraduate diploma in "Criminal Justice and Police Management" from the University of Leicester in the United Kingdom in 2003.

Ahmed held several positions in the Lebanese ISF starting in 1986, when he began his service in the Emergency Company of the Beirut Police Unit. He then transferred to the Information Technology Department in the Electronic Detachment in 1988, and later assumed training duties at the ISF Institute in 1990. Following that, he took on administrative and security roles, including Head of the Administration Branch in the Regional Gendarmerie Command in 1990, Head of the Intelligence Bureau in the Information Branch in 1996, and Commander of the Investigation Detachment in the Prime Minister's Guard Company in 1998. At the turn of the millennium, he was appointed Head of the Services and Operations Branch in the Judicial Police Command, later serving as Assistant Commander of the Beirut Judicial Detachment and Head of the Receiving Bureau in the Central Administration Unit in 2004. In 2005, he advanced to become Assistant Head of the Planning and Organization Division and Commander of the Prime Minister's Guard Company. He commanded the Prime Minister's Guard Company on two occasions, in 2005 and 2011. He also served as Head of the Beirut Information Branch in 2009 and Head of the Administrative Affairs Division in the Directorate General of the Internal Security Forces in 2010.

Between 2014 and 2022, he served as Commander of the Internal Security Forces Institute, a member of the Command Council, and part of the coordination team with the British Police Support Team and EU projects supporting the ISF. He headed the committee for the Municipal Police Reform and Development Project at the Ministry of Interior and Municipalities and led the Strategic Planning Team between 2015 and 2022. In 2025, he issued a decision to remove portraits of martyrs from the roads in the Duris and Baalbek area. He promised "security" and "transparency" would be staples of his tenure in the Ministry of Interior and Municipalities.
