= Salim Haidar =

Lebanese jurist and politician (1911–1980)

Minister of Agriculture
- In office 16 September 1953 – 17 September 1955
- Prime Minister: Sami Solh

Minister of Telegraph and Telephone
- In office 16 September 1953 – 17 September 1955
- Prime Minister: Sami Solh

Minister of Defense
- In office 30 September 1952 – 6 February 1953
- Prime Minister: Khaled Chehab

Personal details
- Born: May 1911 Baalbek, Beqaa, Lebanon
- Died: 3 October 1980 (aged 68–69)
- Spouse: Samiha Suleiman Haidar
- Children: 3
- Education: Sorbonne University

Salim Haidar (1911–1980) was a Lebanese jurist and politician who held several cabinet posts during the 1950s, including minister of defense. He was also a member of the Lebanese Parliament.

== Early life and education ==
Haidar hailed from a Shiite family based in Baalbek, Beqaa. His family was among the leading landlords of the region. He was born in Baalbek in May 1911. His father was Najib Haidar.

He was a graduate of Lycée Française and then obtained a PhD in law from Sorbonne University.

== Career and activities ==
Following his graduation Haidar returned to Lebanon and became a public prosecutor in 1938 and an investigative judge in 1943. He began to serve as an advisor at the Court of Appeal from 1945. He was named as the ambassador of Lebanon to Iran in 1946.

Haidar was appointed minister of defense to the cabinet led by Prime Minister Khaled Chehab on 30 September 1952. Haidar's term lasted until 6 February 1953 when he resigned from the post. He was first elected to the Parliament from his hometown in the 1953 elections ousting his cousin Ibrahim Haidar who had been serving at the Parliament for thirty years. Following his election as a deputy Salim Haidar involved in drafting the Lebanon's first anti-corruption law in 1953. On 16 September 1953 he was appointed minister of agriculture and minister of telegraph and telephone to the cabinet headed by Prime Minister Sami Solh. Haidar's term lasted until 17 September 1955.

During the turmoil in Lebanon in 1958 Haidar was part of the anti-government coalition. He was appointed ambassador of Lebanon to Morocco in 1958 and to the Soviet Union in 1963. In 1968 he was again elected as a deputy.

== Personal life and death ==
In addition to his political activities Haidar also published books on Arabic literature and poetry. He was married to Samiha Suleiman Haidar with whom he had three children: Hayyan Haidar, a civil engineer, Hassan and Hammad. Salim Haidar died on 3 October 1980.
