= Adnan Mroueh =

Lebanese politician (1936–2025)

- عدنان مروة

Minister of Tourism
- In office 15 September 1983 – 30 April 1984
- Succeeded by: Walid Jumblatt

Minister of Commerce
- In office 15 September 1983 – 30 April 1984
- Succeeded by: Walid Jumblatt

Minister of Labour
- In office 7 October 1982 – 30 April 1984
- Succeeded by: Salim Al-Huss

Minister of Social Affairs
- In office 7 October 1982 – 30 April 1984
- Succeeded by: Pierre Gemayel

Minister of Public Health
- In office 7 October 1982 – 30 April 1984
- Preceded by: Nazih Bizri
- Succeeded by: Pierre Gemayel

Personal details
- Born: 1936 Jbaa, Greater Lebanon
- Died: 7 December 2025 (aged 89) Beirut, Lebanon
- Education: American University of Beirut (BS); University of California, Los Angeles; Yale School of Medicine
- Occupation: Physician

Adnan Mroueh (Arabic: عدنان مروة; 1936 – 7 December 2025) was a Lebanese politician. He served multiple ministerial posts, namely Minister of Public Health from 1982 to 1984 and Minister of Tourism from 1983 to 1984.

Mroueh died in Beirut on 7 December 2025, at the age of 89.
