= Al-Fajr Forces =

Militia forces of the Islamic Group

- قوات الفجر
- Dates active: 1982–present
- Allegiance: Muslim Brotherhood
- Active regions: Southern Lebanon
- Ideology: Sunni Islamism; Anti-Zionism
- Part of: Islamic Group
- Wars: Israeli–Lebanese conflict: 1982 Lebanon War; South Lebanon conflict (1985–2000); Israel–Hezbollah conflict (2023–present); 2024 Israeli invasion of Lebanon

Al-Fajr Forces (Arabic: قوات الفجر, romanized: Quwwāt al-Fajr, lit. 'Dawn Forces') are the military wing of the Islamic Group (Al-Jama’a al-Islamiyya), a Sunni Islamist political movement in Lebanon. The Islamic Group is the Lebanese branch of the Muslim Brotherhood, with Al-Fajr Forces operating as its military wing. The military wing was established in 1982 following the Israeli invasion of Lebanon. Since then Al-Fajr Forces have acted as a resistance force in Lebanon.

== History ==
=== Origins and early activity (1982–2000) ===
Al-Fajr Forces were established in response to the Israeli invasion of Lebanon in 1982. They have been part of resistance forces fighting against Israeli occupation of southern Lebanon and protecting Sunni communities. During the 1980s and 1990s, the armed wing operated mainly along the coastal areas of southern Lebanon and in the cities of Sidon, Tripoli, and Beirut. Al-Fajr Forces also took part in the Lebanese Civil War and other operations against Israel.

=== Decline and dormancy (2000–2023) ===
Israel withdrew its forces from Lebanon in 2000. This led to a decline in Al-Fajr Forces' activity. They subsequently became a low-profile armed faction with limited operational capacity, focusing more on political and social activities.

=== Revival and renewed conflict (2023–present) ===
Following the beginning of the Gaza war in 2023, Al-Fajr Forces re-emerged as an active military force. The group reportedly joined Hezbollah and participated in firing rockets into northern Israel during the 2023 conflict. As their involvement grew, they became a target for Israeli forces. In April 2025, Hussein Izzat Mohammad Atwi, the military leader of Jamaa Islamiya, was reported killed by an Israeli drone strike.

== Organization and structure ==
Reports suggest Al-Fajr Forces lack a centralized command and are organized into local units across southern Lebanon. Estimates claim the armed wing has only a few hundred members. Leadership is thought to be handled by a council connected to the Islamic Group’s political leadership, while local commanders coordinate operations.

== Ideology and alliances ==
As the armed wing of the Islamic Group, Al-Fajr Forces are linked to Sunni Islamist ideology, emphasizing Islamic governance, social welfare, and resistance against occupation. Despite ideological differences, they have cooperated with Hezbollah and other Lebanese resistance groups, especially during conflicts with Israel. The group has also been linked to Hamas after the October 7 attacks.

== Designation ==
On 13 January 2026, the United States designated the group as a Foreign Terrorist Organization and a Specially Designated Global Terrorist entity as the Lebanese branch of the Muslim Brotherhood. On 16 January 2026, Argentina followed suit and declared the group as a terrorist organization.

== See also ==
- Islamic Group (Lebanon)
- Hezbollah
- Lebanese Civil War
- Israel–Lebanon conflict
