= Mahmoud Abdel Khalek =

Lebanese politician

Mahmoud Abdel Khalek (Arabic: محمود عبد الخالق; born 1938) is a Lebanese politician.

== Career ==
He is a Member of the Syrian Social Nationalist Party (SSNP), which he was president, he ran unsuccessfully for the 2000 parliamentary elections for the post of Druze member of Baabda.

He was president of the Supreme Council of the SSNP when, in October 2004 he was appointed minister without portfolio in the government of Omar Karami, a position he held until February 2005.
