= Samir Jisr =

Lebanese politician

- سمير عدنان الجسر

Member of the Parliament of Lebanon
- In office 2005–2022

Personal details
- Born: 10 June 1944 (age 80)
- Political party: Future Movement

Samir Adnan Jisr (Arabic: سمير عدنان الجسر; born 10 June 1944) is a lawyer, legislator and previous Lebanese politician from the Future Movement. He was elected to represent Tripoli in the Parliament of Lebanon for consecutive terms since 2005 to 2022.

Jisr was previously elected as head of the Bar Association of Tripoli, and served as Minister of Justice (2000-2003), and minister of education (2003-2004) in the governments of Rafic Al Hariri.

== See also ==
- List of members of the 2018–2022 Lebanese Parliament
