= Hassan Sabeh =

Lebanese politician

Major General Hassan Sabeh (Arabic: حسن سبع) is a Lebanese politician and was the Interior Minister and Municipalities in the 2005-2009 cabinets of Prime Minister Fouad Siniora.

A Sunni Muslim and former Army officer, he was elected on the pro-Hariri Future Movement slate in the 2005 parliamentary election and became Minister for the Interior in the new government.

On 5 February 2006 he tendered his resignation to an emergency meeting of the Lebanese cabinet after thousands of protesters torched the building that houses the Danish consulate in Beirut during the Jyllands-Posten Muhammad cartoons controversy.

After Pierre Amine Gemayel's assassination, Sabeh returned to the government.
