= Omar Karami =

Former Prime Minister of Lebanon

- عمر كرامي
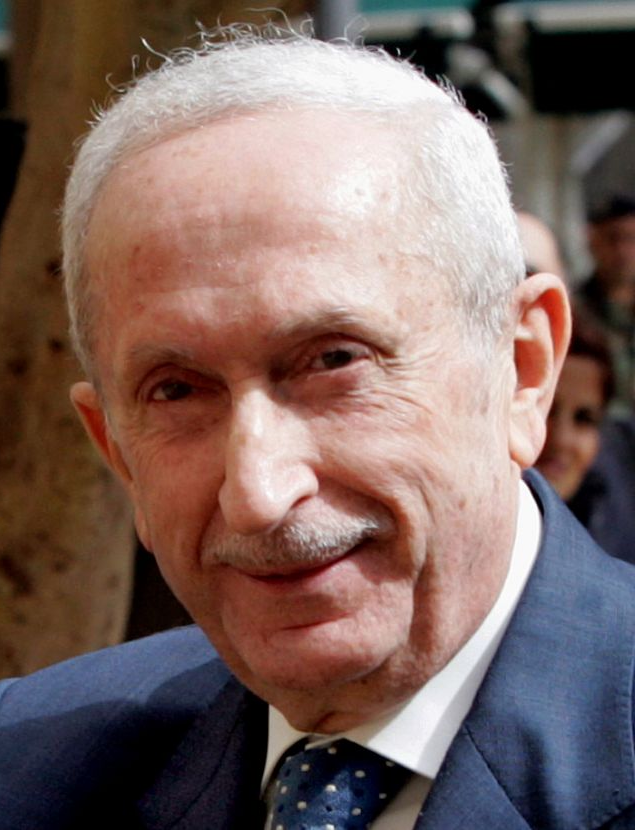

39th & 44th Prime Minister of Lebanon
- In office 26 October 2004 – 19 April 2005
- President: Emile Lahoud
- Deputy: Issam Fares
- Preceded by: Rafik Hariri
- Succeeded by: Najib Mikati
- In office 24 December 1990 – 13 May 1992
- President: Elias Hrawi
- Deputy: Michel Murr
- Preceded by: Salim Al-Huss
- Succeeded by: Rachid Solh

Minister of National Education and Fine Arts
- In office 25 November 1989 – 24 December 1990
- Prime Minister: Salim Al-Huss
- Preceded by: Michel Aoun
- Succeeded by: Peter War

Member of the Lebanese Parliament
- In office 20 October 1992 – May 2005
- Constituency: Tripoli District

Personal details
- Born: 7 September 1934 An Nouri, French Mandate of Lebanon
- Died: 1 January 2015 (aged 80) Beirut, Lebanon
- Party: Arab Liberation Party
- Education: Cairo University

Omar Abdul Hamid Karami (last name also spelled Karamé and Karameh) (Arabic: عمر عبد الحميد كرامي; 7 September 1934 – 1 January 2015) was a Lebanese lawyer and politician who served as 39th prime minister of Lebanon for two non-consecutive terms. He was Prime Minister for the first time from 24 December 1990, when Salim Al-Huss gave up power, until May 1992, when he resigned due to economic instability. He was again Prime Minister from October 2004 to April 2005 as the 44th Prime Minister.

== Early life ==
Karami was born Omar Abdul Hamid Karami in the northern Lebanese town of An Nouri, near Tripoli in 1934 to a Sunni Muslim family. He was the son of former prime minister and independence hero Abdul Hamid Karami. He was the brother of Arab nationalist, eight-time prime minister and major Lebanese statesman, Rashid Karami, who was assassinated in 1987. Omar Karami held a degree in law, which he received from Cairo University in 1956.

== Career ==
Karami worked both as a lawyer and businessman. In 1989, he was appointed education minister and on 24 December 1990, prime minister. He was in office until May 1992 when he resigned due to the collapse of the Lebanese pound against the US dollar which provoked street riots. Karami was elected as Parliamentary representative of Tripoli in 1991, following his brother's assassination. In late October 2004, he formed a cabinet after the resignation of Rafik Hariri.

Due to the assassination of ex-prime minister Hariri on 14 February 2005, members of the opposition blamed Syria for the assassination, and demanded Syria withdraw its troops and intelligence personnel from Lebanon. Protests grew in Beirut despite an official ban on public protests, and the opposition planned to call for a no confidence vote. Amid the growing pressure, Karami announced on 28 February 2005 that his government would resign, although it remained temporarily in a caretaker role.

Ten days after the resignation, following protests in Beirut that were supportive of president Karami, President Émile Lahoud re-appointed Karami as prime minister on 10 March and asked him to form a new government. With the backing of a majority of deputies, Karami called on all parties to join a government of national unity.

On 13 April, after failing to create a new government, Karami resigned again. He was replaced by Najib Mikati in the post. This resignation added to the turmoil already prevalent in Lebanon since Hariri's assassination as now there was no government to call the elections which were due that upcoming May. Karami did not run for office in the 2005 general elections.

== Personal life ==
Karami was the father of Faisal Karami.

== Death ==
On the morning of 1 January 2015, Karami died following a long period of illness at the age of 80.

Political offices
Preceded by Selim al-Hoss	Prime Minister of Lebanon; 1990–1992	Succeeded by Rashid el-Solh
Preceded by Rafik Hariri	Prime Minister of Lebanon; 2004–2005	Succeeded by Najib Mikati
