= Ibrahim Haidar =

Lebanese politician (1867–1974)

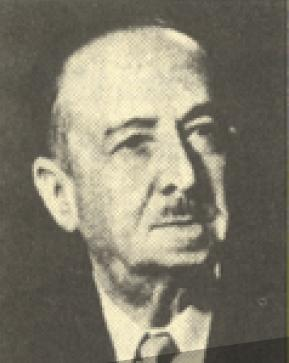

Personal details
- Born: Ibrahim Assaad Haidar; 1867; Baalbek, Syria Vilayet, Ottoman Empire
- Died: 1974 (aged 106–107)

Ibrahim Haidar (Arabic: إبراهيم حيدر; 1867 – 1974) was a Lebanese politician who served as a minister multiple times.

Born in Baalbek, he moved to France to study agricultural engineering and graduated in 1912. He was sentenced to death by the Ottoman authorities for his support of the Arab Revolt and opposition to Ottoman policies.

Following the establishment of the State of Greater Lebanon in 1920, he was appointed as a member of the Administrative Committee, the first legislative body of Lebanon. He was also appointed as a member of the first representative council.

In 1926, the Senate was formed, with Haidar as a member, but was later impeached by the High Commissioner. He was replaced by Ahmad al-Husseini. Haidar served in the Lebanese Parliament for thirty years until 1953 representing Baalbek. His cousin Salim Haidar ousted him and won the seat in the 1953 elections.
