= Auguste Adib Pacha =

Lebanese politician (1859–1936)

- أوغست أديب باشا
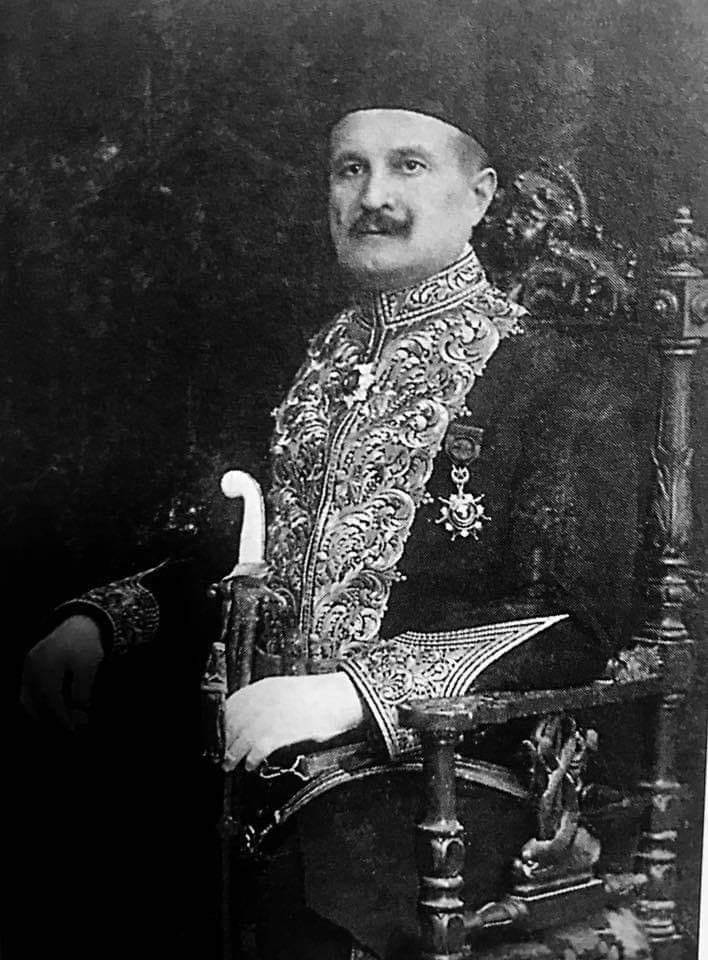

1st Prime Minister of Lebanon
- In office 31 May 1926 – 5 May 1927
- President: Charles Debbas
- Preceded by: Office established
- Succeeded by: Bechara Khoury
- In office 25 March 1930 – 9 March 1932
- President: Charles Debbas
- Preceded by: Émile Eddé
- Succeeded by: Charles Debbas

Personal details
- Born: 2 August 1859 Istanbul, Ottoman Empire
- Died: 9 July 1936 (aged 76) Paris, France
- Party: Independent
- Spouse: Rose Khayat

Auguste Adib Pacha (Arabic: أوغست أديب باشا; 2 August 1859 – 9 July 1936) was the first Prime Minister of Lebanon, which at the time was under the French mandate of Greater Lebanon. He served in that capacity twice between 1926 and 1932.

== Life ==
Auguste Charles Adib was born in Constantinople to Ibrahim Adib and Maddalena Veronica Collaro. His father was born to a Maronite family from the Lebanon mountains, while his mother was born to an Italian family living in Constantinople. He first studied at the Jesuit School of Deir Mar Maroun in Ghazir, then upon completion he went to Saint Joseph University in Beirut. In 1885 he moved to Egypt where he worked in the local administration.

He was one of the founding fathers of the Lebanese Alliance, which was founded in Cairo in 1908. This party demanded – like other Arab groups in the Ottoman Empire – that the Arab areas of the empire be granted independence. At the same time, it sought to create a Christian-dominated state called Greater Lebanon for Lebanese Christians. Their desire for a Christian-dominated state set Adib and his compatriots apart from the Pan-Arab ideas of other proponents of independence among the Arabs of the Middle East.

He returned to Lebanon in 1920 after the First World War, having spent two and a half decades in Egypt. The collapse of the Ottoman Empire, which released the Arabic-populated areas in the Middle East from Ottoman dominion, is what prompted his return. In 1926, French colonialists divided the former mandated territory of Syria and Lebanon establishing the State of Lebanon. Charles Debbas was the first President and he, Auguste Adib, was the first prime minister, taking office on 31 May 1926. In December 1926, Adib traveled to Paris to take part in a Conference on resolving the outstanding debt the Ottoman Empire had left to her successors. Meanwhile, back in Lebanon, there was a power struggle between Émile Eddé, and Béchara El-Khoury as both sought to succeed him. Adib was not up to this pressure and resigned on 5 May 1927. A few years later, he became Prime Minister again on 25 March 1930. He held the office this time until 9 March 1932. He was related to some other notable individuals, the most prominent of whom was his nephew Camille Chamoun, who would eventually become president.

He died on 9 July 1936, in Paris, at the 8th arrondissement.

== Death ==
On 9 July 1936, around noon, Auguste Adib was in a hotel room on the 5th floor of 29 rue de l'Arcade in Paris, that he had been renting for the past few years. As a result of a false move, he knocked over a lighted lamp on the carpet. His clothes caught fire and was seriously burned all over his body. He was transported, in an alarming state, to the Beaujon hospital, where he later died.

Political offices
Preceded by -	Prime Minister of Lebanon; 1926-1927	Succeeded by Bechara Khoury
Preceded by Émile Eddé	Prime Minister of Lebanon; 1930-1932	Succeeded by Charles Debbas
