= Office of the Minister of State for Administrative Reform (Lebanon) =

The Lebanese Office of the Minister of State for Administrative Reform (Arabic: مكتب وزير الدولة لشؤون التنمية الإدارية) was created in May and December 1994 in order to provide solutions and reform for a deficient post-civil war public administration.

The ministry consists of four units:

- Technical Cooperation Unit
- Advisory Group
- Administration Department
- Institutional Development Unit

Inaya Ezzeddine took over the office in Prime Minister Saad Hariri's government of 2016, replacing Nabil de Freige.
