= Ahmed al-Husseiny =

Lebanese politician

- أحمد الحسيني
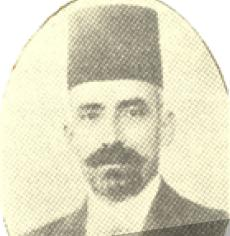

Ahmed Moustafa al-Husseiny (Arabic: أحمد الحسيني) was a Lebanese politician who served as minister and deputy multiple times.

He was born in Mazraat es-Siyad in Jbeil. He replaced Ibrahim Haidar as a Senator in 1926. He joined the National Bloc led by Émile Eddé, and represented them in different cabinets.
