= Constitutional Bloc (Lebanon) =

Lebanese political party

Constitutional Bloc الكتلة الدستورية
- Leader: Bechara El Khoury; Camille Chamoun
- Founded: 1934
- Dissolved: 1958
- Headquarters: Beirut
- Membership: ▼10000 (2018-it is said that the current number of members is close to 100)
- Ideology: Secular liberalism National liberalism Nonsectarianism; Pro-National Pact
- Political position: Centre

Constitutional Bloc (Arabic: الكتلة الدستورية; transliterated as Al Kutla ad Dustuuriyya) was a Lebanese political party established in 1934 by Bechara El Khoury and advocating the full independence of Lebanon ruled at the time by the French Mandate and fought for its achievement in 1943. The Bloc also advocated an active role in establishing the Arab League with Lebanon as an integral part of the Arab World. It was also active in approving the Lebanese National Pact as an agreement between the various Lebanese religious communities, an unwritten agreement that laid the foundation of Lebanon as a multi-confessional state.

Bechara El Khoury, the head of the Constitutional Bloc became President of Lebanon under French Mandate from 21 September 1943 to 11 November 1943, and after a brief taking over by the former President Émile Eddé for 11 days from 11 to 22 November 1943, was re-elected as first President of the new independent Lebanese Republic presiding for almost 11 years from 22 November 1943 to 18 September 1952 and his Constitutional Bloc one of the components of the Lebanese Parliament and Government.

In the 1950s, the Constitutional Bloc was incorporated as a Lebanese political party known as Constitutional Union Party (Arabic: حزب الإتحاد الدستوري, transliterated as Hizb al Ittihad ad Dustuuri) in opposition to President Camille Chamoun. The running of affairs of the party was taken over by Khalil el Khoury.

In the 1990s, a renewed interest in the party resulted in the declaration of The Grandsons of Bechara (in language أحفاد البشارة transliterated as Ahfaad al Bechara) to revive the legacy and the ideas of the historic founder of the party and former President Bechara El Khoury.
