= Bechara El Khoury =

President of Lebanon from 1943 to 1952

Bechara Khalil El Khoury
- بشارة خليل الخوري
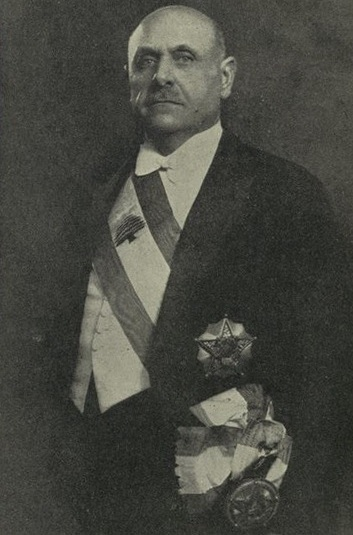
- Official portrait, 1947

1st President of Lebanon
- In office 22 November 1943 – 18 September 1952
- Prime Minister: Riad Solh; Abdul Hamid Karami; Sami Solh; Saadi Al Munla; Hussein Al Oweini; Abdallah El-Yafi; Nazem Akkari; Saeb Salam
- Succeeded by: Camille Chamoun
- In office 21 September 1943 – 11 November 1943
- Preceded by: Petro Trad
- Succeeded by: Émile Eddé

Prime Minister of Lebanon
- In office 5 May 1927 – 10 August 1928
- President: Charles Debbas
- Preceded by: Auguste Adib Pacha
- Succeeded by: Habib Pacha Es-Saad
- In office 9 May 1929 – 11 October 1929
- President: Charles Debbas
- Preceded by: Habib Pacha Es-Saad
- Succeeded by: Émile Eddé

Personal details
- Born: 10 August 1890 Rechmaya, Aley District, Ottoman Lebanon
- Died: 11 January 1964 (aged 73) Beirut, Lebanon
- Citizenship: Ottoman Empire (1890–1918); Arab Kingdom of Syria (1918–1920); Greater Lebanon (1920–1943); Lebanon (1943–1964)
- Party: Constitutional Bloc
- Spouse: Laure Shiha
- Children: 3, including Huguette Caland and Michel El Khoury
- Religion: Maronite

Bechara Khalil El Khoury (Arabic: بشارة خليل الخوري; 10 August 1890 – 11 January 1964) was a Lebanese politician who served as the 1st president of Lebanon, holding office from 21 September 1943 to 18 September 1952, apart from an 11-day interruption (11–22 November) in 1943. He had previously served two short terms as Prime Minister, from 5 May 1927 to 10 August 1928, and 9 May to 11 October 1929.

== Early life and education ==
Khoury was born in Rechmaya, to Lebanese Maronite Christian parents in a town in the Aley district, Mount Lebanon governorate on 10 August 1890. He studied law.

== Political career ==
Khoury founded the Constitutional Bloc Party and served as a cabinet minister prior to his election as president on 21 September 1943. He was a strong nationalist who opposed the French Mandate, and on 11 November 1943, he was arrested by Free French troops and imprisoned in the Rashaya Tower for eleven days, along with Riad Al Solh (Prime Minister), Camille Chamoun, and numerous other personalities who were to dominate politics in the generation following independence.

Massive demonstrations forced the Free French forces to release the prisoners, including Khoury, on 22 November 1943, a date now celebrated as Lebanon's national independence day.

Khoury is remembered for his part in drawing up the National Pact, an agreement between Lebanon's Christian and Muslim leaders that forms the basis of the country's constitutional structure today although it was not codified in the Constitution of Lebanon until the Taif Agreement of 1989. Christians accepted Lebanon's affiliation with the Arab League and agreed not to seek French protection, and Muslims agreed to accept the Lebanese state in its present boundaries and promised not to seek unification with neighbouring Syria. The Pact also distributed seats in the National Assembly in a ratio of six Christians to five Muslims, based on the 1932 census, which has since been modified to represent followers of both religions equally. Most significantly, the three main constitutional offices (President, Prime Minister, and National Assembly Speaker) were respectively assigned to a Maronite Christian, Sunni Muslim, and Shi'a Muslim, Lebanon's three largest confessions, respectively.

Khoury's years in office were marked by great economic growth, but the 1948 Arab-Israeli War in which Lebanon was on the Arab side strained the Lebanese economy with its financial cost and with the influx of some 100,000 Palestinian refugees. His administration and presidency had a reputation for major corruption. El-Khoury faced significant opposition from traditional Za'im leaders on whose powers his policies were beginning to impinge. In 1951 an alliance was formed between Camille Chamoun, Pierre Gemayel, Raymond Eddé, Kamal Jumblatt, Phalange and Syrian National Party under the unlikely name of the "National Socialist Front". On 18 September 1952, amidst widespread demonstrations, the Front succeeded in forcing El Khoury's resignation.

== Personal life ==
El Khoury married Laura Shiha in 1922. She was the sister of banker and intellectual Michel Shiha who helped El Khoury financially and introduced him the ideas about the confessional power-sharing and free market economy.

His son Michel El Khoury served as the governor of the Lebanese central bank between 1978 and 1984 and between 1991 and 1993.

Paul Peter Meouchi, Maronite Patriarch of Antioch, was his second cousin.

== Legacy ==
El Khoury is widely considered a national hero in Lebanon for his role in its independence, and to be one of the most significant figures in the modern politics of the country. However, he has been criticised for several points in his presidency, most notably corruption, nepotism, and electoral fraud.

== See also ==
- List of presidents of Lebanon
- Constitutional Bloc (Lebanon)
- Émile Eddé

Political offices
Preceded by Émile Eddé	President of Lebanon; 1943–1952	Succeeded by Fuad Chehab; Acting
Preceded by Petro Trad	President of Lebanon; 1943	Succeeded by Émile Eddé
Preceded by Habib Pacha Es-Saad	Prime Minister of Lebanon; 1929	Succeeded by Émile Eddé
Preceded by Auguste Adib Pacha	Prime Minister of Lebanon; 1927–1928	Succeeded by Habib Pacha Es-Saad
