= Ministry of Public Health (Lebanon) =

Government ministry of Lebanon

Lebanese Republic Ministry of Public Health وزارة الصحّة العامة

Agency overview
- Jurisdiction: Government of Lebanon
- Minister responsible: Rakan Nassereddine
- Agency executive: Minister of Public Health
- Website: moph.gov.lb

The Ministry of Public Health (Arabic: وزارة الصحّة العامة) is a ministry of the government of the Republic of Lebanon. As of 2025, the Minister of Health is Rakan Nassereddine.

The ministry's Department of Primary Healthcare operates over 200 primary health care centres across Lebanon. The ministry operates a network of 31 government-operated hospitals.

Its headquarters are in Bir Hassan, in the Jnah neighborhood of the capital city Beirut.

== Ministers ==
Minister	Term of office	
Majid Arslan (Note: Served simultaneously as Minister of National Defense.)	25 Sep 1943	9 Jan 1945
Ahmed al-Asaad	9 Jan 1945	22 Aug 1945
Jamil Talhouk	22 Aug 1945	22 May 1946
Majid Arslan	22 May 1946	14 Dec 1946
Elias Khoury (Note: Served simultaneously as Minister of Education.)	14 Dec 1946	7 Jun 1947
Camille Chamoun	7 Jun 1947	26 Jul 1948
Elias Khoury	26 Jul 1948	1 Oct 1949
Raiif Abillamah	1 Oct 1949	14 Feb 1951
Boulos Fayad (Note: Served simultaneously as Minister of Justice.)	14 Feb 1951	7 Jun 1951
Bahij Taq-al-Din	7 Jun 1951	11 Feb 1952
Majid Arslan	11 Feb 1952	9 Sep 1952
Basil Trad (Note: Did not submit a ministerial statement to Parliament.)	9 Sep 1952	18 Sep 1952
Nazem Akkari (Note: Served simultaneously as Minister of Telecommunications.)	18 Sep 1952	30 Sep 1952
Salim Haidar	30 Sep 1952	30 Apr 1953
Rashid Baydoun	30 Apr 1953	16 Aug 1953
Kazem al-Khalil	16 Aug 1953	16 Sep 1954
Charles Helou	16 Sep 1954	9 Jul 1955
Gabriel Murr	9 Jul 1955	19 Sep 1955
Nazih Bizri	19 Sep 1955	18 Nov 1956
Majid Arslan	18 Nov 1956	18 Aug 1957
Joseph Skaff	18 Aug 1957	14 Mar 1958
Albert Mokhaiber	14 Mar 1958	24 Sep 1958
Mohamed Safieddine	24 Sep 1958	14 Oct 1958
Pierre Gemayel	14 Oct 1958	14 May 1960
Awad Mikdad	14 May 1960	1 Aug 1960
Elias Khoury	1 Aug 1960	20 May 1961
Pierre Gemayel (Note: Served simultaneously as Minister of Finance.)	20 May 1961	31 Oct 1961
Ali Bazze	31 Oct 1961	20 Feb 1964
Mohamed Knio	20 Feb 1964	18 Nov 1964
Yacoub Sarraf	18 Nov 1964	25 Jul 1965
Mohamed Knio (Note: Served simultaneously as Minister of Interior and Municipalities.)	25 Jul 1965	9 Apr 1966
Kamel Asaad	9 Apr 1966	6 Dec 1966
Nassib Barbir	6 Dec 1966	8 Feb 1968
Khaled Joumblat	8 Feb 1968	12 Oct 1968
Pierre Gemayel	12 Oct 1968	15 Jan 1969
Khatchig Babikian	15 Jan 1969	25 Nov 1969
Habib Moutran	25 Nov 1969	13 Oct 1970
Emile Bitar	13 Oct 1970	27 May 1972
Nazih Bizri	27 May 1972	25 Apr 1973
Amin Hafez (Note: Resigned 14 June 1973. Their resignation was accepted on 8 July 1973.)	25 Apr 1973	8 Jul 1973
Ousman Dana	8 Jul 1973	30 Oct 1974
Majid Arslan	30 Oct 1974	23 May 1975
Nureddine Rifai (Note: Served simultaneously as Minister of Justice until June 1975.)	23 May 1975	1 Jul 1975
Majid Arslan	1 Jul 1975	9 Dec 1976
Ibrahim Cheaito	9 Dec 1976	16 Jul 1979
Talal El Merhebi	16 Jul 1979	25 Oct 1980
Nazih Bizri	25 Oct 1980	8 Oct 1982
Adnan Mroueh	8 Oct 1982	29 Apr 1984
Pierre Gemayel (Note: Died while in office.)	30 Apr 1984	29 Aug 1984
Joseph Hashem	29 Aug 1984	22 Sep 1988
Edgar Maalouf	22 Sep 1988	25 Nov 1989
Abdullah Rassi	25 Nov 1989	23 Dec 1990
Jamil Kebbeh	24 Dec 1990	15 May 1992
Marwan Hamadeh	16 May 1992	7 Nov 1996
Suleiman Frangieh	7 Nov 1996	4 Dec 1998
Karam Karam	4 Dec 1998	26 Oct 2000
Suleiman Frangieh	26 Oct 2000	26 Oct 2004
Mohamad Khalifeh	26 Oct 2004	13 Jan 2011
Position vacant	13 Jan 2011	13 Jun 2011
Ali Hassan Khalil	13 Jun 2011	15 Feb 2014
Wael Abou Faour	15 Feb 2014	18 Dec 2016
Ghassan Hasbani	18 Dec 2016	31 Jan 2019
Jamil Jabak	31 Jan 2019	21 Jan 2020
Hamad Hasan (Note: Resigned 10 August 2020, but remained in office as caretaker minister.)	21 Jan 2020	10 Sep 2021
Firass Abiad (Note: Resigned 30 October 2022, but remained in office as caretaker minister.)	10 Sep 2021	8 Feb 2025
Rakan Nassereddine	8 Feb 2025	Incumbent

== See also ==
- Health in Lebanon
