= Ministry of Interior and Municipalities (Lebanon) =

Government ministry of Lebanon

Ministry of Interior and Municipalities وزارة الداخلية والبلديات

Agency overview
- Formed: 1943; 83 years ago
- Jurisdiction: Government of Lebanon
- Headquarters: Hamra, Beirut (Lebanon)
- Agency executive: Ahmad al-Hajjar, Minister of Interior and Municipalities
- Website: Official website

The Ministry of Interior and Municipalities (Arabic: وزارة الداخلية والبلديات) in Lebanon is responsible for governorate, caza, municipalities, federation of municipalities and village matters, in addition to political parties and organizations.

The ministry was created in the first post-independence government in 1943. In 2000, it was named the Ministry of Interior and Municipalities. Since 8 February 2025, the ministry has been led by Ahmad al-Hajjar.

== List of Interior and Municipalities ministers ==
| Minister | Term of office | |
|---|---|---|
| Camille Chamoun (Note: Served simultaneously as Minister of Telecommunications.) | 25 Sep 1943 | 03 Jul 1944 |
| Riad Al Solh (Note: Served simultaneously as Minister of Economy and Trade.) (Note: Served simultaneously as Prime Minister.) | 03 Jul 1944 | 09 Jan 1945 |
| Wadih Naeem | 09 Jan 1945 | 22 Aug 1945 |
| Youssef Salam | 22 Aug 1945 | 22 May 1946 |
| Saeb Salam | 22 May 1946 | 14 Dec 1946 |
| Sabry Hamada | 14 Dec 1946 | 07 Jun 1947 |
| Camille Chamoun | 07 Jun 1947 | 26 Jul 1948 |
| Gabriel Murr | 26 Jul 1948 | 01 Oct 1949 |
| Elias El Khoury | 01 Oct 1949 | 14 Feb 1951 |
| Hussein Al Oweini (Note: Served simultaneously as Minister of Foreign Affairs.) | 14 Feb 1951 | 07 Jun 1951 |
| Abdallah Yafi | 07 Jun 1951 | 11 Feb 1952 |
| Sami as-Solh | 11 Feb 1952 | 09 Sep 1952 |
| Nazem Akkari | 09 Sep 1952 | 14 Sep 1952 |
| Saeb Salam | 14 Sep 1952 | 18 Sep 1952 |
| Fuad Chehab | 18 Sep 1952 | 30 Sep 1952 |
| Khaled Shehab | 30 Sep 1952 | 30 Apr 1953 |
| Saeb Salam | 30 Apr 1953 | 16 Aug 1953 |
| Abdallah Yafi | 16 Aug 1953 | 03 Jan 1954 |
| George Hrawi | 03 Jan 1954 | 16 Sep 1954 |
| Gabriel Murr | 16 Sep 1954 | 09 Jul 1955 |
| Mohieddin Al Nasuli | 09 Jul 1955 | 19 Sep 1955 |
| Rashid Karami | 19 Sep 1955 | 19 Mar 1956 |
| Abdallah Yafi | 19 Mar 1956 | 18 Nov 1956 |
| Sami as-Solh (Note: Served simultaneously as Minister of Justice until January 1957.) | 18 Nov 1956 | 24 Sep 1958 |
| Rashid Karami | 24 Sep 1958 | 14 Oct 1958 |
| Raymond Edde (Note: Served simultaneously as Minister of Telecommunications until 7 October 1959.) | 14 Oct 1958 | 14 May 1960 |
| Edmond Kaspar | 14 May 1960 | 01 Aug 1960 |
| Saeb Salam | 01 Aug 1960 | 20 May 1961 |
| Abdullah Al Mashnouk | 20 May 1961 | 31 Oct 1961 |
| Kamal Jumblatt | 31 Oct 1961 | 20 Feb 1964 |
| Hussein Al Oweini | 20 Feb 1964 | 18 Nov 1964 |
| Takieddin el-Solh | 18 Nov 1964 | 25 Jul 1965 |
| Muhammad Kneiu (Note: Served simultaneously as Minister of Public Health.) | 25 Jul 1965 | 09 Apr 1966 |
| Pierre Gemayel | 09 Apr 1966 | 06 Dec 1966 |
| Badri Al Maoushi | 06 Dec 1966 | 08 Feb 1968 |
| Suleiman Frangieh | 08 Feb 1968 | 12 Oct 1968 |
| Abdallah Yafi | 12 Oct 1968 | 20 Oct 1968 |
| Pierre Gemayel | 20 Oct 1968 | 15 Jan 1969 |
| Adel Osseiran | 15 Jan 1969 | 25 Nov 1969 |
| Kamal Jumblatt | 25 Nov 1969 | 13 Oct 1970 |
| Saeb Salam | 13 Oct 1970 | 25 Apr 1973 |
| Bashir Al Awar | 25 Apr 1973 | 08 Jul 1973 |
| Bahij Taq-al-Din | 08 Jul 1973 | 31 Oct 1974 |
| Rashid al-Solh | 31 Oct 1974 | 23 May 1975 |
| Said Nasrallah | 23 May 1975 | 01 Jul 1975 |
| Camille Chamoun | 01 Jul 1975 | 09 Feb 1976 |
| Salah Salman | 09 Feb 1976 | 16 Jul 1979 |
| Bahij Taq-al-Din | 16 Jul 1979 | 25 Oct 1980 |
| Shafiq Wazzan | 25 Oct 1980 | 30 Apr 1984 |
| Abdullah Rassi | 30 Apr 1984 | 25 Nov 1989 |
| Elias El Khazen | 25 Nov 1989 | 24 Dec 1990 |
| Sami Al Khatib | 24 Dec 1990 | 31 Oct 1992 |
| Bishara Merhej | 31 Oct 1992 | 09 Feb 1994 |
| Michel Murr | 09 Feb 1994 | 26 Oct 2000 |
| Elias Murr | 25 Oct 2000 | 26 Oct 2004 |
| Suleiman Frangieh | 26 Oct 2004 | 19 Apr 2005 |
| Hassan Sabeh | 19 Apr 2005 | 11 Jul 2008 |
| Ziad Baroud | 11 Jul 2008 | 13 Jun 2011 |
| Marwan Charbel | 13 Jun 2011 | 15 Feb 2014 |
| Nohad Machnouk | 15 Feb 2014 | 31 Jan 2019 |
| Raya Haffar Al Hassan | 31 Jan 2019 | 21 Jan 2020 |
| Mohamed Fahmy (Note: Resigned 10 August 2020, but remained in office as caretaker minister.) | 21 Jan 2020 | 10 Sep 2021 |
| Bassam Mawlawi (Note: Resigned 30 October 2022, but remained in office as caretaker minister.) | 10 Sep 2021 | 08 Feb 2025 |
| Ahmad al-Hajjar | 08 Feb 2025 | Incumbent |

== See also ==
- List of town without municipalities in Lebanon
