= Ministry of Justice (Lebanon) =

Government ministry of Lebanon

Lebanese Republic Ministry of Justice
- وزارة العدل
- Emblem of this ministry.

Agency overview
- Jurisdiction: Government of Lebanon
- Headquarters: Sami Solh Street, Adlieh Area, Beirut
- Minister responsible: Adel Nassar
- Agency executive: Minister of Justice
- Website: www.justice.gov.lb

The Ministry of Justice of Lebanon (Arabic: وزارة العدل) is a ministry of the Lebanese government responsible for the administration and organization of the judiciary, oversight of the application of laws, preparation of draft legislation, and representation of the Lebanese state before courts. Its institutional origins date back to the establishment of Greater Lebanon under the French Mandate in 1920, and its current structure is governed primarily by Legislative Decree No. 151 of 1983, which remains in force.

== List of Justice ministers ==
The following is a list of Heads of justice administration in Lebanon:

Minister	Term of office	
Charles Dabbas	01 Sep 1920	May 1926
Najib Kabbani	May 1926	May 1927
Choucri Cardahi	May 1927	May 1928
Bechara El Khoury	May 1928	Aug 1928
Najib Sawan	Aug 1928	
Choucri Cardahi	Aug 1928	May 1929
Najib Sawan	May 1929	Mar 1930
Ahmed al-Husseiny	Mar 1930	Jul 1931
Auguste Pacha	Jul 1931	May 1932
Sami Al Khoury	May 1932	Jan 1937
Khayreddin al-Ahdab	Jan 1937	Mar 1938
Khaled Chehab	Mar 1938	Nov 1938
Abdallah El-Yafi	Nov 1938	Dec 1941
Philippe Boulos	Dec 1941	Jul 1942
Ahmed al-Husseiny	Jul 1942	Mar 1943
Ayoub Tabet	Mar 1943	Sep 1943
Habib Abu Shahla	Sep 1943	Jan 1945
Salim Habib Takla	Jan 1945	
Henri Pharaoun	Jan 1945	22 Aug 1945
Saadi Al Munla	22 Aug 1945	22 May 1946
Ahmed al-Husseiny	22 May 1946	Dec 1946
Abdallah El-Yafi	Dec 1946	Jul 1948
Riad Al Solh	Jul 1948	01 Oct 1949
Charles Helou	01 Oct 1949	14 Feb 1951
Boulos Fayyad (Note: Served simultaneously as Minister of Economy and Trade.) (Note: Served simultaneously as Minister of Public Health.)	14 Feb 1951	07 Jun 1951
Rashid Karami	07 Jun 1951	11 Feb 1952
Fouad Al-Khoury	11 Feb 1952	09 Sep 1952
Basil Trad (Note: Their task was to hold parliamentary elections, and no ministerial statement was submitted.)	09 Sep 1952	18 Sep 1952
Khaled Chehab (Note: Did not present themselves in front of Parliament and did not submit a ministerial statement.)	18 Sep 1952	30 Sep 1952
Mousa Mubarak (Note: Served simultaneously as Minister of Telecommunications.)	30 Sep 1952	30 Apr 1953
Muhieddin Al-Nasali	30 Apr 1953	16 Aug 1953
Bashir Al Awar	16 Aug 1953	01 Mar 1954
Alfred Naqqache (Note: Served simultaneously as Minister of Foreign Affairs.)	01 Mar 1954	16 Sep 1954
Charles Helou	16 Sep 1954	09 Jul 1955
Gabriel Murr	09 Jul 1955	19 Sep 1955
Fouad Ghosn	19 Sep 1955	19 Mar 1956
Salim Lahoud	19 Mar 1956	08 Jun 1956
Alfred Naqqache	09 Jun 1956	Nov 1956
Sami Solh (Note: Served simultaneously as Minister of Interior and Municipalities.)	Nov 1956	03 Jan 1957
Emile Dawood Tian	03 Jan 1957	18 Aug 1957
Sami Solh	18 Aug 1957	14 Mar 1958
Bashir Al Awar	14 Mar 1958	24 Sep 1958
Yousef Al-Suda	24 Sep 1958	Oct 1958
Hussein Al Oweini	Oct 1958	
Philippe Takla	Oct 1958	14 May 1960
Gibran Nahas (Note: Served simultaneously as Minister of Education.)	14 May 1960	01 Aug 1960
Nasim Majdalani	01 Aug 1960	20 May 1961
Philippe Boulos	20 May 1961	31 Oct 1961
Fouad Boutros	31 Oct 1961	20 Feb 1964
Gibran Nahas	20 Feb 1964	Jul 1965
Emile Dawood Tian	Jul 1965	Nov 1965
Nasim Majdalani	Nov 1965	Apr 1966
Philippe Takla	Apr 1966	06 Dec 1966
Fouad Rizk	06 Dec 1966	08 Feb 1968
Rashid Baydoun	08 Feb 1968	Oct 1968
Majid Arslan	Oct 1968	15 Jan 1969
Shafik Wazzan	15 Jan 1969	25 Nov 1969
Adel Osseiran	25 Nov 1969	13 Oct 1970
Jamil Rachid Kabbi	13 Oct 1970	27 May 1972
Bashir Al Awar	27 May 1972	25 Apr 1973
Kazem al-Khalil (Note: Appointed in April 1973, but did not submit a ministerial statement to Parliament. Reappointed in July 1973.)	25 Apr 1973	May 1975
Nureddine Rifai (Note: Resigned June 1975.)	May 1975	Jun 1975
Position vacant	Jun 1975	09 Dec 1976
Farid Raphaël (Note: Served simultaneously as Minister of Finance.)	09 Dec 1976	16 Jul 1979
Youssef Gebran	16 Jul 1979	25 Oct 1980
Khatchig Babikian	25 Oct 1980	08 Oct 1982
Roger Shaikhani	08 Oct 1982	29 Apr 1984
Nabih Berri	29 Apr 1984	22 Sep 1988
Lotfi Jaber	22 Sep 1988	25 Nov 1989
Edmond Rizk	25 Nov 1989	16 May 1992
Nasri Maalouf	16 May 1992	30 Oct 1992
Bahij Tabbara	31 Oct 1992	24 Dec 1998
Joseph Shaoul	24 Dec 1998	23 Oct 2000
Samir Jisr (Note: Served simultaneously as Minister of Education from 17 April 2003 to 26 October 2004.)	23 Oct 2000	26 Oct 2004
Adnan Addoum	26 Oct 2004	19 Apr 2005
Khaled Qabbani	19 Apr 2005	19 Jul 2005
Charles Rizk	19 Jul 2005	21 Jul 2008
Ibrahim Najjar	22 Jul 2008	13 Jun 2011
Shakib Qortbawi	13 Jun 2011	15 Feb 2014
Ashraf Rifi (Note: Resigned 21 February 2016.)	15 Feb 2014	21 Feb 2016
Position vacant	21 Feb 2016	18 Dec 2016
Salim Jreissati	18 Dec 2016	31 Jan 2019
Albert Serhan	31 Jan 2019	21 Jan 2020
Marie-Claude Najm (Note: Resigned 10 August 2020, but remained in office as caretaker minister.)	21 Jan 2020	10 Sep 2021
Henry Khoury (Note: Resigned 30 October 2022, but remained in office as caretaker minister.)	10 Sep 2021	8 Feb 2025
Adel Nassar	8 Feb 2025	Incumbent

== See also ==
- Politics of Lebanon
