= Ministry of Agriculture (Lebanon) =

Government ministry of Lebanon

The Ministry of Agriculture is the ministry responsible for formulating the strategic framework for the agricultural sector and developing practical policies and programs to promote this sector. In addition, the ministry is developing a legal framework for the organization and infrastructure to facilitate investment, production and marketing operations.

Logo of this ministry.

== History ==
In 1920, a decree was issued on the establishment of a horse breeding center and a decree was issued banning the breeding of horses without a license. In 1925, the Governor of Lebanon issued a decree on the need to establish a pest control center. In 1932, President Charles Debbas issued a decree establishing the Agricultural Machinery Center. In 1955, the responsibilities of the Ministry of Agriculture were defined.
