= Ministry of Public Works and Transport (Lebanon) =

Government ministry of Lebanon

Agency overview
- Jurisdiction: Government of Lebanon
- Headquarters: Beirut
- Minister responsible: Fayez Rasamny
- Website: www.transportation.gov.lb

The Ministry of Public Works and Transport (Arabic: وزارة الأشغال العامة والنقل) is one of the government ministries of Lebanon. The incumbent minister is Fayez Rasamny.

== Directorates ==
The Ministry is organised into four Directorates:

- Directorate General of Land and Maritime Transport, responsible for setting, implementing and monitoring all policies related to land and maritime transport
- Directorate General of Roads and Buildings, which is responsible for the construction, rehabilitation, and maintenance of public roads and government buildings
- Directorate General of Civil Aviation, responsible for setting and implementing air transport policies within the country in compliance with international policies, and for controlling the air traffic within the Lebanese territory
- Directorate General of Urban Planning, responsible for setting and putting into practice land use policies

== Previous Ministers ==
- Michel Najjar, 21 January 2020 – 10 September 2021
- Ali Hamiyeh, 10 September 2021 – 8 February 2025

== See also ==
- Lebanese Ministry of Defense
