= Lebanese Sunni Muslims =

Sunni Muslims in Lebanon

Lebanese Sunni Muslims المسلمون السنة اللبنانيين
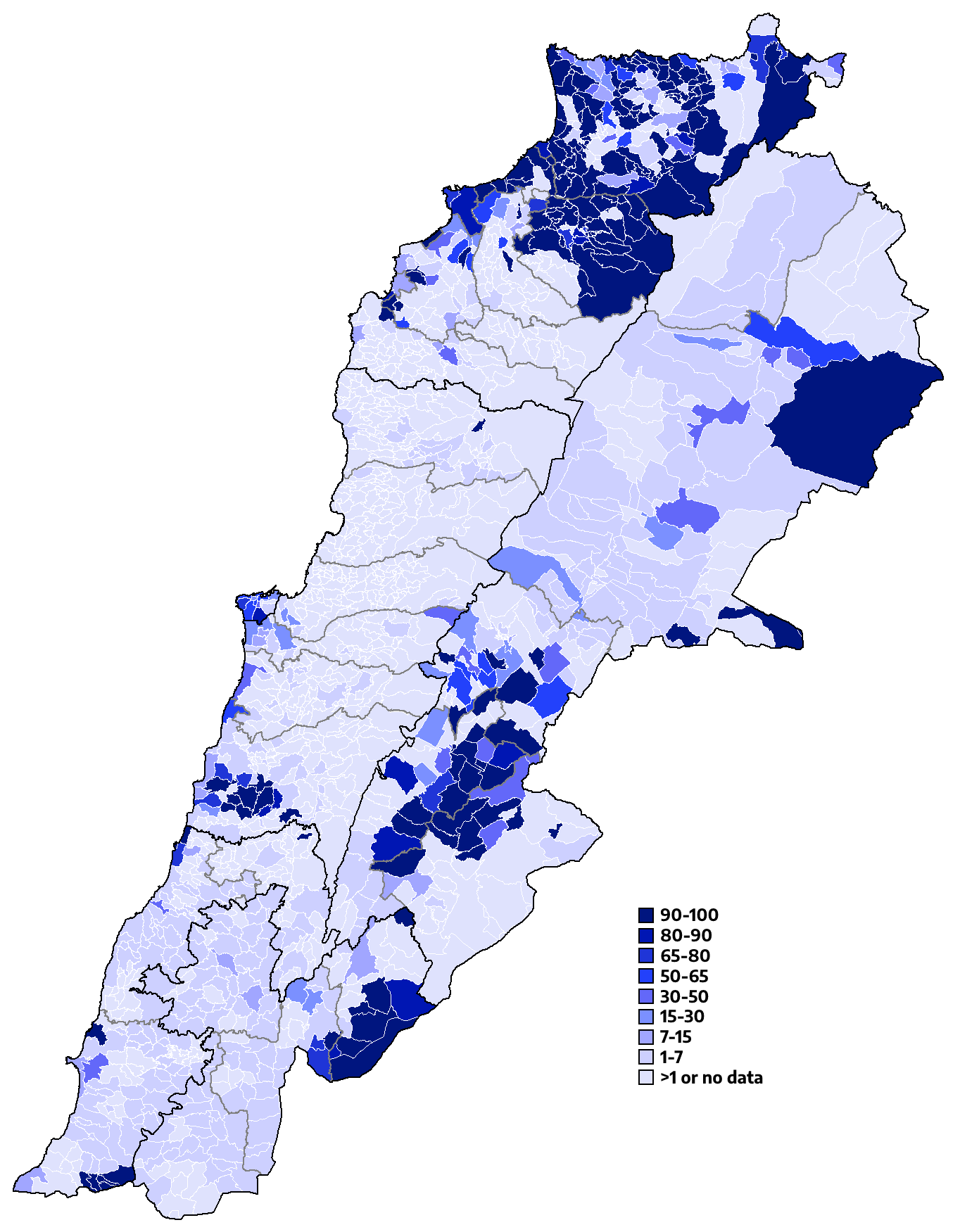
- Distribution of Sunni Muslims in Lebanon

Total population
- ~1,200,000 (30.6%)

Languages
- Vernacular: Lebanese Arabic

Religion
- Islam (Sunni Islam)

Lebanese Sunni Muslims (Arabic: المسلمون السنة اللبنانيين) refers to Lebanese people who are adherents of the Sunni branch of Islam in Lebanon, which is one of the largest denomination in Lebanon tied with Shias. Sunni Islam in Lebanon has a history of more than a millennium. According to a CIA 2018 study, Lebanese Sunni Muslims constitute an estimated 30.6% of Lebanon's population.

The Lebanese Sunni Muslims are highly concentrated in Lebanon's capital city - Beirut (West Beirut /or Beirut II), as well as Tripoli, Sidon, Western Beqaa, and in the countryside of the Akkar, Arsal. They also have a notable presence in Zahlé, Southern Lebanon, Marjaayoun and Chebaa.

Under the terms of an unwritten agreement known as the National Pact between the various political and religious leaders of Lebanon, Sunni notables traditionally held power in the Lebanese state together, and they are still the only ones eligible for the post of Prime Minister.

== History ==
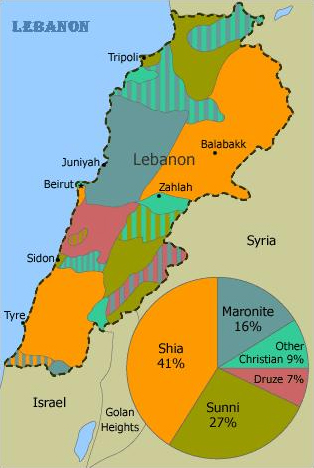
An estimate of the distribution of Lebanon's main religious groups, 1991, based on a map by GlobalSecurity.org

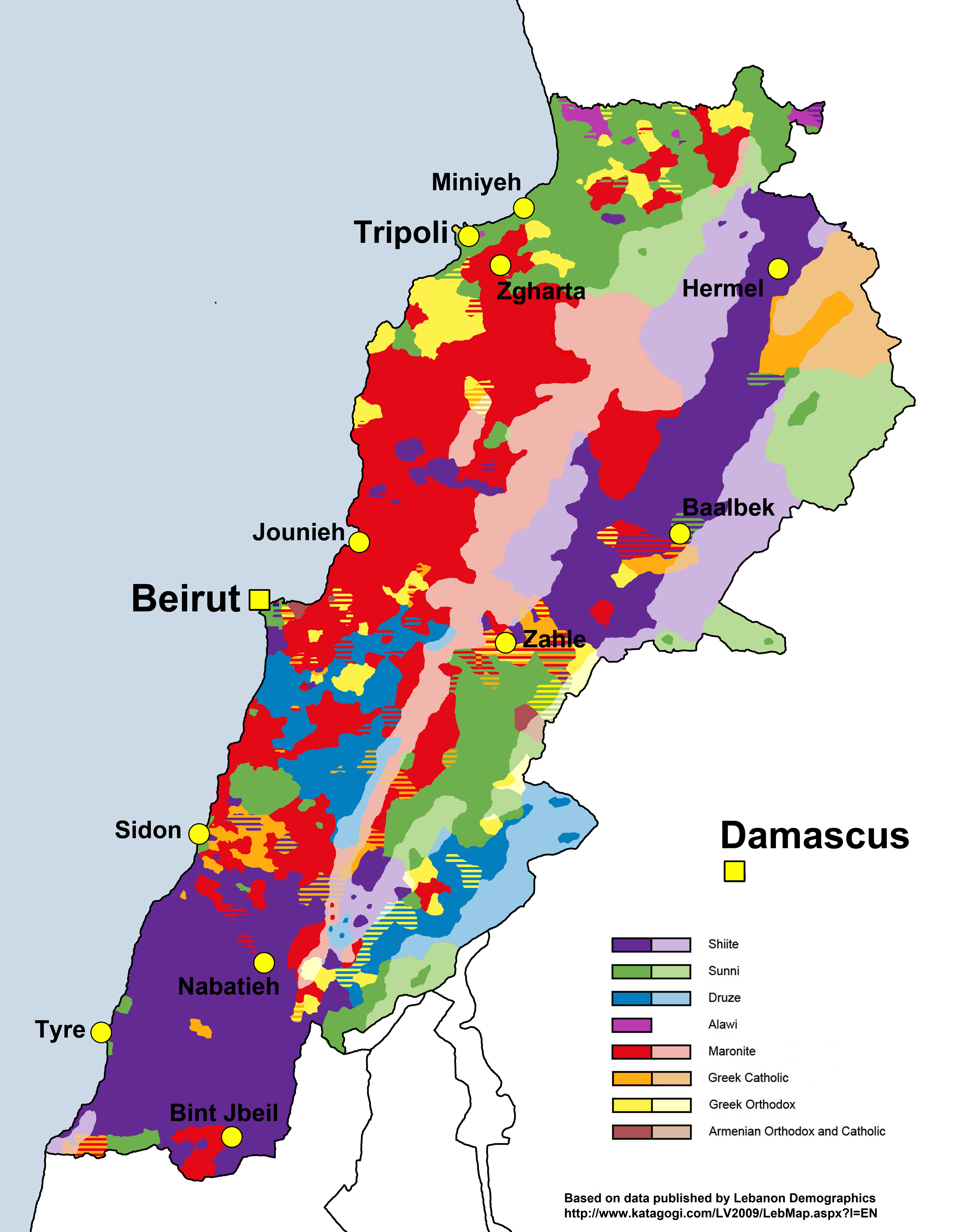
Lebanon religious groups distribution

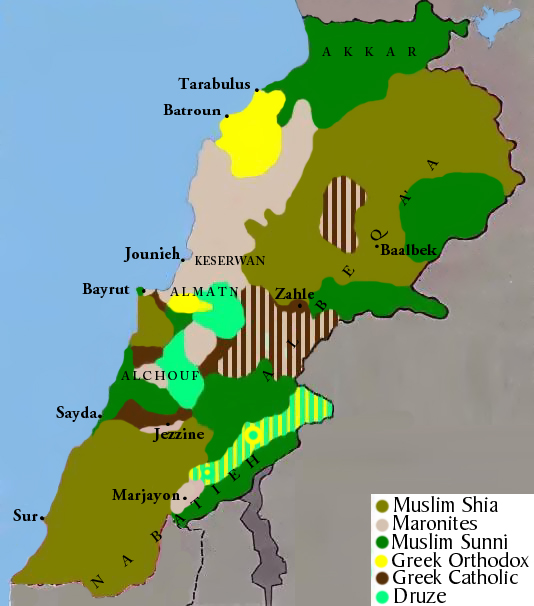
An estimate of the area distribution of Lebanon's main religious groups

=== Ottoman rule ===
Historically, Sunnis in Lebanon fared better under the rule of the Ottoman Empire than did Lebanon's other religious groups. Although the Ottomans ruled loosely, the Sunnis in coastal cities were given a degree of privileged status. However, this ended with the French mandate.

=== French mandate ===
In 1920, France legally extended the borders of Greater Lebanon to include all the territories of what is now Lebanon. This enhanced the position of the Maronites, whose population exceeded that of the Sunni Muslims in the new districts. This changed Lebanon's demographics, as the territories added contained predominantly Muslim areas. This made Lebanese Christians constitute barely over 50% of the population, whereas the Sunni population increased eightfold. The Sunnis resented this, as they were formerly part of the majority within the Ottoman Empire, but now became a minority in a Maronite-dominated French mandate. In the 1932 Lebanon census, 175,925 individuals, constituting 22% of the total population of 785,543, were Sunni Muslims.

The Lebanese Sunni Muslims did not want to be separated from their Sunni Muslim brethren in Syria, whereas the Lebanese Christians wanted a French or European-oriented Lebanon to ensure economic viability that was separate from Syria. The Sunni community saw Greater Lebanon as an artificial entity, and repeatedly insisted on being reunited with Greater Syria and the rest of the Arab homeland.

=== Lebanese Civil War ===
In 1975, the Lebanese Civil War broke out between Maronite forces and the Lebanese Army on one side, and Sunni militias of the Lebanese National Movement (LNM) and Palestine Liberation Organization (PLO) on the other. Pan-Arabism and leftism attracted its largest following among the Sunni community of Lebanon. Following the Sabra and Shatila massacre in 1982, the Mourabitoun launched a series of attacks on the Israel Defense Forces. The Taif Agreement in October 1989 ended the civil war. It provided equal representation for Christians and Muslims in the enlarged chamber of deputies, reduced the powers of the Maronite president, and increased powers for the Sunni prime minister. With Saudi Arabian support, the Sunnis achieved a position of power out of all proportion to their number or influence.

== Relations ==
=== With Saudi Arabia ===
The Sunnis of Lebanon have close ties with Saudi Arabia, who supports them financially. Moreover, Tripoli, the stronghold of the Lebanese Sunnis, is also the birthplace of Lebanon's Salafi movement. According to 2016 polling, 82% of Lebanese Sunnis have a favorable opinion of Saudi Arabia.

=== With Lebanese Alawites and Syria ===
The Lebanese Sunni Muslims initially opposed the creation of the Lebanese state separated from Syria, where the majority of the population was also Sunni Muslim, and wanted the territory of present-day Lebanon to be incorporated within the so-called Greater Syria.

Sunni Muslims and Alawites have been in conflict with each other for centuries. The Alawites of the Levant were oppressed by the Sunni Ottoman Empire, but gained power and influence when the French recruited Alawites as soldiers during the French mandate of Syria. After independence from France, their co-religionists, the Assad family, came to power in Syria in 1970.

Over the years, there have been numerous clashes between the Sunni and Alawi communities in Tripoli since the breakout of the Syrian revolution, as part of the Arab Spring that started in Tunisia. At the best of times, the Alawites are regarded by Sunnis as heretics; at times of tension, when thousands of Sunnis in Syria were being killed, they were regarded as the enemy. And when a popular Sunni figure is strangely abducted and arrested by Lebanon's General Security Service – the Alawites become the scapegoats. Throughout the Syrian civil war, most Lebanese Sunnis supported the Syrian opposition, with some joining Syrian rebel forces and supplying the Free Syrian Army with arms and munitions.

In December 2024, Lebanese Sunnis took to the streets to celebrate the fall of the Assad regime following successful HTS-led Syrian opposition offensives, with major demonstrations especially in Tripoli and Beirut. Lebanese Sunni share many views with the new Syrian government of Ahmed al-Sharaa, including opposition to Hezbollah and the Axis of Resistance. According to analysts, the events in Syria have empowered Lebanese Sunnis and emboldened Salafist groups in Lebanon, who may now deepen their ties with Salafist counterparts in Syria.

=== With Iran and Hezbollah ===
Lebanese Sunnis are largely hostile to Iran, viewing it as a destabilizing force due to its support for Hezbollah and other Shia militias. According to polling data from 2012, 95% of Lebanese Sunnis hold a negative view of Iran, with 94% strongly opposing the Iranian nuclear program.

Sunnis are also vehemently opposed to Hezbollah—viewing it as an untrustworthy sectarian force—a stance that intensified following the assassination of Sunni former Prime Minister Rafic Hariri in 2005, which was blamed on Hezbollah. Their opposition deepened further following the 2008 Lebanon conflict and Hezbollah's involvement in the Syrian civil war in support of the Assad regime. In 2010, 84% of Lebanese Sunnis had a negative view of Hezbollah, compared to only 12% that had a positive view.

== Geographic distribution within Lebanon ==
Lebanese Sunni Muslims are concentrated in cities of west Beirut, Tripoli, Sidon and in north Lebanon in the Akkar and Minnieh Dinnieh districts, middle and West Bekaa, Chouf district and Laqlouq in Mount Lebanon, Hasbaya district, and Northeastern Beqaa Valley mainly in and around the city of Arsal.

== Demographics ==
Lebanese Sunni Muslims
Year	Percent
1932	22%
1975	26%
1988	21%
2012	27%
2018	31.9%

Note that the following percentages are estimates only. However, in a country that had last census in 1932, it is difficult to have correct population estimates.

The last census in Lebanon in 1932 put the numbers of Sunnis at 22% of the population (178,100 of 791,700). A study done by the Central Intelligence Agency (CIA) in 1985 put the numbers of Sunnis at 27% of the population (595,000 of 2,228,000). Sunni Muslims constitute 27% of Lebanon's population, according to a 2012 estimate. And more recently, in 2023, the CIA World Factbook estimated that Sunni Muslims constitute 31.9% of Lebanon's population.

Percentage growth of the Lebanese Sunni Muslims (other sources est.)
Year	Sunni Population	Total Lebanese Population	Percentage
1861	76,565	487,600	15.7%
1921	124,786	609,069	20.5%
1932	175,925	785,543	22.4%
1956	285,698	1,407,858	20.3%
1975	663,500	2,550,000	26%
1988	861,046	4,044,784	21.3%

Distribution of Lebanese Sunni Muslims by governorates
Governorates of Lebanon	2014		2022	
Governorates of Lebanon	Pop.	%	Pop.	%
North Governorate	286 292	28.83%	333 184	29.29%
Beirut Governorate	211 862	21.33%	231 695	20.37%
Akkar Governorate	170 566	17.17%	202 146	17.77%
Beqaa Governorate	109 859	11.06%	124 952	10.98%
Mount Lebanon Governorate	70 918	7.14%	78 383	6.89%
South Governorate	68 671	6.93%	79 501	6.99%
Baalbek-Hermel Governorate	41 084	4.14%	48 328	4.25%
Nabatieh Governorate	30 716	3.09%	36 877	3.24%
Keserwan-Jbeil Governorate	3 156	0.32%	2 499	0.22%
Total Lebanese Sunni population	993 124	100%	1 137 565	100%

== Genetics ==
Genealogical DNA testing has shown that 27,7% of Lebanese Muslims (non-Druze) belong to the Y-DNA haplogroup J-M267. Although there is common ancestral roots, these studies show some difference was found between Muslims and non-Muslims in Lebanon, of whom only 17.1% have this haplotype. Although haplogroup J1 is most frequent in Arabian peninsula, studies have shown that it has been present in the Levant since the Bronze Age and only expanded later into Arabia.

Only 4.7% of all Lebanese Muslims belong to haplogroup R1b, compared to 9.6% of Lebanese Christians. Modern Muslims in Lebanon thus do not seem to have a significant genetic influence from the Crusaders, who probably introduced this common Western European marker to the extant Christian populations of the Levant when they were active in the region from 1096 until around the turn of the 14th century. Haplogroup J2 is also a significant marker in throughout Lebanon (27%). This marker is found in many inhabitants of Lebanon, regardless of religion, signals pre-Arab descendants, including the Phoenicians. These results show us there is no significant differences between the Muslims and non-Muslims of Lebanon.

== Notable Lebanese Sunni Muslims ==
=== Activists and journalists ===
- Anbara Salam Khalidi, a feminist, translator and author, who significantly contributed to the emancipation of Arab women
- Nahla Chahal, writer, journalist, researcher, and activist

=== Artists ===
- Randa Chahal Sabag, film director, producer and screenwriter
- Amar, Lebanese singer and actress
- Suzanne Tamim, the late singer
- Fadl Shaker, singer
- Walid Toufic, singer
- Wael Jassar, singer

=== Politicians, diplomats, and public servants ===
- Salim Ali Salam, former deputy from Beirut to the Ottoman Parliament, former President of the Municipality of Beirut, and former President of the Muslim Society of Benevolent Intentions (al-Makassed)
- Saeb Salam, politician, who served as Prime Minister six times between 1952 and 1973
- Riad Al Solh, the first Prime Minister of Lebanon (1943–1945), after the country's independence
- Emir Khaled Chehab, former Prime Minister of Lebanon and Speaker of the Parliament of Lebanon.
- Rafik Hariri, assassinated former Prime Minister of Lebanon
- Saad Hariri, former Prime Minister of Lebanon
- Fouad Siniora, former Prime Minister of Lebanon
- Abdul Hamid Karami, former Prime Minister of Lebanon
- Omar Karami, former Prime Minister of Lebanon
- Rashid Karami, former Prime Minister of Lebanon
- Najib Mikati, Prime Minister of Lebanon
- Tammam Salam, politician and former Prime Minister of Lebanon
- Mohamad Chatah, assassinated Lebanese economist and diplomat
- Ashraf Rifi, former major general and director of the Lebanese Internal Security Forces and current minister of justice
- Hassan Diab, former prime minister of Lebanon
- Nawaf Salam, a diplomat, jurist, and academic. He acted as judge on the International Court of Justice for the 2018–2027 term
- Wissam al-Hassan, assassinated brigadier general at the Lebanese Internal Security Forces (ISF)
- Ali Al Hajj, former major general and director of the Lebanese Internal Security Forces

=== Religious figures ===
- Hassan Khaled, late former leader of Lebanon's Sunni Muslim community

=== Businessmen ===
- Al-Waleed bin Talal, Saudi-Lebanese businessman and grandson of Riad Al Solh, Lebanon's first Prime Minister

=== Sportsman ===
- Hazem El Masri, Lebanese-Australian professional rugby league player

== See also ==
- Religion in Lebanon
- Lebanese Shia Muslims
- Lebanese Druze
- Lebanese Maronite Christians
- Lebanese Melkite Christians
- Lebanese Greek Orthodox Christians
- Lebanese Protestant Christians
- Bab al-Tabbaneh–Jabal Mohsen conflict
- Islamic Group (Lebanon)
- Al-Fajr Forces
