= Prime Minister of Lebanon =

Head of government of Lebanon

Prime Minister of Republic of Lebanon
- French: Premier ministre; Arabic: رئيس الحكومة
- Emblem of Lebanon

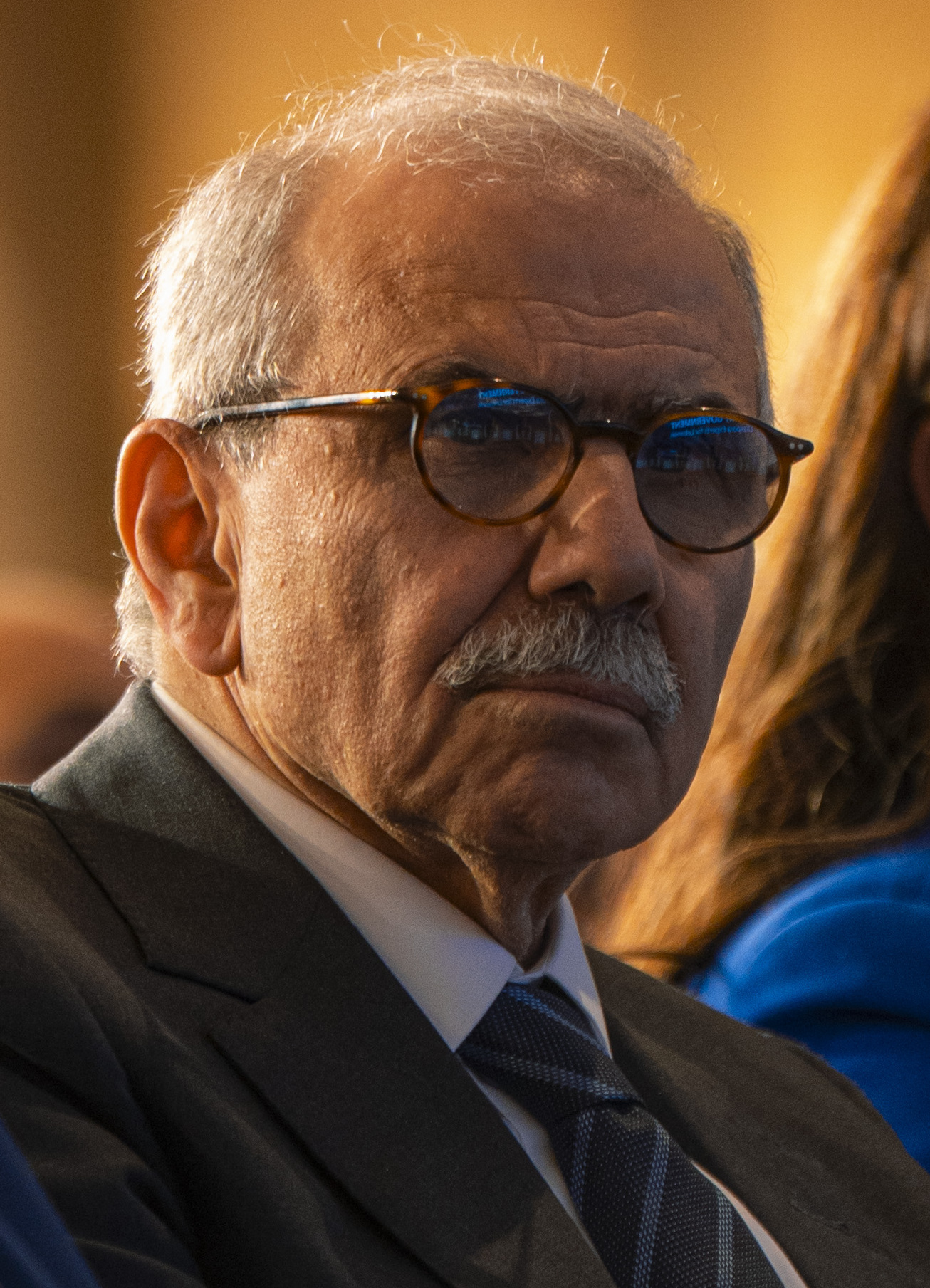
- Incumbent; Nawaf Salam since 8 February 2025
- Member of: Council of Ministers
- Residence: Grand Serail, Beirut
- Nominator: Parliament
- Term length: Three years
- Inaugural holder: Auguste Adib Pacha; 31 May 1926
- Formation: Constitution of Lebanon; 23 May 1926
- Deputy: Deputy Prime Minister of Lebanon
- Salary: £L212,844,000/US$ 3,547 annually
- Website: Lebanese Government Website

The prime minister of Lebanon (French: Premier ministre; Arabic: رئيس الحكومة, romanized: Ra'īs al-Ḥukūma) is the head of government of Lebanon.

By convention, the office holder is always a Sunni Muslim.

The current prime minister is Nawaf Salam. He was tasked by President Joseph Aoun to form the new government after mandatory parliamentary consultations on 13 January 2025, having received 84 out of 128 votes. The prime minister designate does not assume office until both he and the president sign an official decree forming the government as per article 64 of the Lebanese constitution. On 8 February 2025, the new government was formed and Nawaf Salam officially assumed his duties as prime minister of Lebanon.

The prime minister is assisted by the deputy prime minister of Lebanon, currently Tarek Mitri as of 8 February 2025.

== History ==
The office was created on 23 May 1926, when the constitution of the state of Greater Lebanon was promulgated. In the summer of 1943, when the National Pact was agreed, it was decided that the office of the prime minister would always be reserved for a Sunni Muslim. From the creation of the office in 1926 to the end of the Lebanese Civil War, the constitution made little mention of the roles and duties of the office, and most of the office's powers were exercised through informal means rather than through constitutional procedures. Following the end of the Civil War and the ratification of the Ta'if Accord, the responsibilities of the prime minister were codified and clearly listed in the Constitution.

=== Differences with French constitution ===
While the 1926 Constitution of was roughly modeled after the French constitution (Greater Lebanon being under French mandate), the office of the prime minister in Lebanon was notably significantly weaker in Lebanon than in France, for the president was the sole person who can dismiss him (at will), while in France the prime minister is appointed by the president, and can only be removed by the Parliament through a vote of no confidence. This means that the prime minister of Lebanon was much more deferential to the president than his French counterpart. This situation changed following the Taif Agreement which transformed Lebanon into a parliamentary republic. Currently, the prime minister is appointed by the president who chooses the candidate which garners the support of the plurality of parliament members. The prime minister must form a government which can receive the confidence of parliament and the agreement of the president. After obtaining confidence, the prime minister can only be dismissed if they lose the confidence of parliament.

=== Past irregularities in the office of the prime minister ===
Twice in the past, when the president resigned or shortly before his term expired, the president broke the National Pact and appointed a Maronite Christian with the justification that he would assume the powers of the presidency.

First, in 1952, Bechara El Khoury, just before his resignation as president, appointed Fouad Chehab as Prime Minister and thus acting president. Chehab was prime minister for 13 days and acting president for 4; once Camille Chemoun was elected to a full term as president, the prime ministership reverted to a Sunni Muslim, Khaled Chehab.

Then, during the Lebanese Civil War, outgoing president Amine Gemayel dismissed incumbent prime minister Selim Hoss and appointed Army general-in-chief Michel Aoun as prime minister 15 minutes before the expiry of his term. Hoss refused his dismissal, and this led to the creation of a dual government: a mainly civilian and Muslim government in West Beirut and a mainly military and Christian one in East Beirut.

== Responsibilities and powers ==
The prime minister is the president of the Council of Ministers and the head of government. In addition, he is the deputy chair of the Supreme Defense Council.

The responsibilities of the prime minister are as follows:

- Assume the negotiations for the formation of the government with parliament.
- Counter-sign all decrees signed by the president, except for the one appointing him or considering the government resigned.
- Present the Council of Minister's program to the Chamber of Deputies.
- He presides over the meetings of the Council of Ministers, except when the president attends, in which case he presides over them.
- In case of a vacancy in the presidency for whatever reason, he assumes the powers and responsibilities of the president in the narrow sense of "conducting the business"

=== Symbolic duties ===
Following the ratification of the Ta'if Accord, the Constitution laid out a preamble for the three "key" executive posts: the president, the prime minister, and the Council of Ministers. The preamble states the following:

The Prime Minister is the Head of Government. He represents it, speaks in its name, and is responsible for executing the public policy made by the Council of Ministers.

In addition, the prime minister also holds these posts ex officio:

- Vice President of the Supreme Defense Council
- President of the Council of Ministers
- Head of the government

== See also ==
- President of Lebanon
- Legislative Speaker of Lebanon
