= List of presidents of Lebanon =

This is a list of presidents of Lebanon since the creation of the office in 1926.

Constitutionally (de jure), the president's post carries significant responsibilities and influence. In practice, the president is largely a ceremonial and symbolic post due to external pressure or the formation of "consensus" cabinets, forcing the president to compromise. In theory, however, the president is responsible for appointing the entire government, therefore the ministers should work to his pleasure. Nevertheless, the president is still able to exercise influence on policy-making and has the role, in conjunction with the prime minister, of choosing ministers in the Government and safeguarding the Constitution of Lebanon.

== National Pact ==
Though it is not specifically stated in the constitution, an unwritten understanding known as the National Pact, agreed in 1943, has resulted in the holder of the post being a Maronite Christian in every electoral cycle since that time.

== List of officeholders ==
=== State of Greater Lebanon, part of the French Mandate (1926–1943) ===
No.	Portrait	Name (Birth–Death)	Term of office			Political party	Notes
No.	Portrait	Name (Birth–Death)	Took office	Left office	Time in office	Political party	Notes
1		Charles Debbas شارل دباس (1884–1935)	1 September 1926	2 January 1934	7 years, 123 days	Independent	During the period of the French mandate in Lebanon, he was appointed minister of justice, then president of the National Assembly, and finally first president of Lebanon. He was elected president in 1926, then re-elected in 1929 by 42 votes out of 44. He was kept at his post until January 1934 by the French mandate. Under his presidency, the disarmament of Greater Lebanon was decided, and he instituted the compulsory baccalaureate for the exercise of liberal professions. He was also minister of justice and president of the Chamber of Deputies in 1934.
1		Charles Debbas شارل دباس (1884–1935)	1926, 1929			Independent	
—		Privat-Antoine Aubouard أنطوان أوبوار (1874–1934)	2 January 1934	30 January 1934	28 days	Independent	He was a member of the French High Commission.
2		Habib Pacha Saad حبيب باشا السعد (1867–1942)	30 January 1934	20 January 1936	1 year, 355 days	Independent	He was also speaker of the Representative Council of Greater Lebanon for 10 years prior to taking office.
3		Émile Eddé إميل أده (1886–1949)	20 January 1936	4 April 1941	5 years, 74 days	National Bloc	Eddé served as the speaker of the Parliament from October 1924 to January 1925 and prime minister of Lebanon from 11 October 1929 to 25 March 1930.
3		Émile Eddé إميل أده (1886–1949)	1936			National Bloc	Eddé served as the speaker of the Parliament from October 1924 to January 1925 and prime minister of Lebanon from 11 October 1929 to 25 March 1930.
—		Pierre-Georges Arlabosse بيار جورج أرلابوس (1891–1950)	4 April 1941	9 April 1941	5 days	Independent	Arlabosse was a French politician who became acting president of Lebanon for 5 days in the interim period in transfer of presidency from Émile Eddé.
4		Alfred Georges Naccache ألفرد جورج النقاش (1887–1978)	9 April 1941	18 March 1943	1 year, 343 days	Kataeb Party	Served as the prime minister of Lebanon (1941) and foreign minister of Lebanon (1953–1955).
—		Ayoub Tabet أيوب تابت (1884–1951)	19 March 1943	21 July 1943	124 days	Independent	Acting. Served as prime minister of Lebanon for the same period.
5		Petro Trad بيترو طراد (1876–1947)	22 July 1943	21 September 1943	61 days	Independent	Trad was elected deputy from Beirut in 1925 serving in the Lebanese Parliament for much of the 1920s and 1930s, either elected or appointed by the French authorities. He was a member of the parliamentary committee that worked on the French-Lebanese Treaty of 1936. The French supported him as the speaker of the Parliament from November 1934 to October 1935 and from October 1937 to September 1939.
6		Bechara Khoury بشارة الخوري (1890–1964)	21 September 1943	11 November 1943	51 days	Constitutional Bloc	Served as prime minister from 1927 until 1928 and again in 1929 prior to his election as president on 21 September 1943. He was a strong nationalist who opposed the French mandate, and on 11 November 1943, he was arrested by Free French troops and imprisoned in the Rashaya Citadel for eleven days along with other prominent politicians.
6		Bechara Khoury بشارة الخوري (1890–1964)	1943			Constitutional Bloc	Served as prime minister from 1927 until 1928 and again in 1929 prior to his election as president on 21 September 1943. He was a strong nationalist who opposed the French mandate, and on 11 November 1943, he was arrested by Free French troops and imprisoned in the Rashaya Citadel for eleven days along with other prominent politicians.

=== Lebanese Republic (1943–present) ===
No.	Portrait	Name (Birth–Death)	Term of office			Political party	Notes
No.	Portrait	Name (Birth–Death)	Took office	Left office	Time in office	Political party	Notes
—		Émile Eddé إميل أده (1886–1949)	11 November 1943	22 November 1943	11 days	National Bloc	The high commissioner installed Eddé as president. Ten days later, however, under pressure from France's other allies in World War II, the French removed Eddé from office and restored the government of Bechara El Khoury on 21 November. He founded the National Bloc.
1		Bechara Khoury بشارة الخوري (1890–1964)	22 November 1943	18 September 1952	8 years, 301 days	Constitutional Bloc	He was released 11 days after being arrested by Free French troops and imprisoned in the Rashaya Tower replacing Emile Edde during World War II.
1		Bechara Khoury بشارة الخوري (1890–1964)	1943, 1948			Constitutional Bloc	He was released 11 days after being arrested by Free French troops and imprisoned in the Rashaya Tower replacing Emile Edde during World War II.
—		Fouad Chehab فؤاد شهاب (1902–1973)	18 September 1952	22 September 1952	4 days	Military	Chehab refused to allow the army to interfere in the uprising that forced Lebanese President Bechara El Khoury to resign. Chehab became the prime minister of Lebanon in September 1952 and held the additional portfolio of defense minister while also forming a military cabinet. Chehab was then appointed acting president with the duty to ensure an emergency democratic presidential election.
2		Camille Chamoun كميل شمعون (1900–1987)	23 September 1952	22 September 1958	6 years	Constitutional Bloc	Served as minister of the interior, post, and telegraph (1943–1944) and minister of the interior, health, and public aid (1947–1948). Near the end of his term, Pan-Arabists and other groups backed by Gamal Abdel Nasser, with considerable support in Lebanon's Muslim community attempted to overthrow Chamoun's government in June 1958 after Chamoun tried to seek another term as president against the constitution. Numerous clashes erupted, resulting in 1958 Lebanon crisis.
2		Camille Chamoun كميل شمعون (1900–1987)	23 September 1952	22 September 1958	6 years	National Liberal Party	Served as minister of the interior, post, and telegraph (1943–1944) and minister of the interior, health, and public aid (1947–1948). Near the end of his term, Pan-Arabists and other groups backed by Gamal Abdel Nasser, with considerable support in Lebanon's Muslim community attempted to overthrow Chamoun's government in June 1958 after Chamoun tried to seek another term as president against the constitution. Numerous clashes erupted, resulting in 1958 Lebanon crisis.
2		Camille Chamoun كميل شمعون (1900–1987)	1952			National Liberal Party	Served as minister of the interior, post, and telegraph (1943–1944) and minister of the interior, health, and public aid (1947–1948). Near the end of his term, Pan-Arabists and other groups backed by Gamal Abdel Nasser, with considerable support in Lebanon's Muslim community attempted to overthrow Chamoun's government in June 1958 after Chamoun tried to seek another term as president against the constitution. Numerous clashes erupted, resulting in 1958 Lebanon crisis.
3		Fouad Chehab فؤاد شهاب (1902–1973)	23 September 1958	22 September 1964	6 years	Independent	Chehab was the prime minister of Lebanon in September 1952, and held the additional portfolio of defense minister while also forming a military cabinet. Chehab was appointed acting president with the duty to ensure an emergency democratic presidential election. Following a path of moderation and co-operating closely with the various religious groups, and with both secular and religious forces, Chehab was able to cool tensions and bring stability back to the nation. His ideology inspired the presidencies of 2 other presidents.
3		Fouad Chehab فؤاد شهاب (1902–1973)	1958			Independent	
4		Charles Helou شارل حلو (1913–2001)	23 September 1964	22 September 1970	6 years	Chehabist	Helou served as ambassador to the Vatican in 1947, minister of justice and health (1954–1955), and minister of education (1964). The Six-Day War of 1967 strained sectarian relations in Lebanon. Many Muslims wanted Lebanon to join the Arab war effort, while many Christians wished to eschew participation. Helou managed to keep Lebanon from entanglement, apart from a brief air strike, but found it impossible to put the lid on the tensions that had been raised. Parliamentary elections in 1968 revealed an increasing polarization in the country, with two major coalitions, one pro-Arab nationalism, led by Rashid Karami; and the other pro-Western, led jointly by former Presidents Camille Chamoun, Pierre Gemayel, and Raymond Eddé, both made major gains and won 30 of the 99 seats each.
4		Charles Helou شارل حلو (1913–2001)	1964			Chehabist	
5		Suleiman Frangieh سليمان فرنجية (1910–1992)	23 September 1970	22 September 1976	6 years	Marada Movement	Frangieh formed and headed the Marada Movement. In the closest and possibly most controversial presidential election in Lebanese history, the National Assembly elected Frangieh to the Presidency of the Republic on 23 September 1970. He oversaw the beginning of the Lebanese Civil War in the fifth year of his tenure.
5		Suleiman Frangieh سليمان فرنجية (1910–1992)	1970			Marada Movement	Frangieh formed and headed the Marada Movement. In the closest and possibly most controversial presidential election in Lebanese history, the National Assembly elected Frangieh to the Presidency of the Republic on 23 September 1970. He oversaw the beginning of the Lebanese Civil War in the fifth year of his tenure.
6		Élias Sarkis إلياس سركيس (1924–1985)	23 September 1976	22 September 1982	6 years	Chehabist	It was hoped that Sarkis would be able to unite the warring factions and end the emerging civil war; by September 1976, however, the situation had grown past the government's control as Syria and other countries began interfering and complicating the situation. On 5 March 1980, Sarkis developed his policy as part of his attempts to create national accord: unity, independence, and parliamentary democracy, rejecting the Camp David Accords between Egypt and Israel.
6		Élias Sarkis إلياس سركيس (1924–1985)	1976			Chehabist	It was hoped that Sarkis would be able to unite the warring factions and end the emerging civil war; by September 1976, however, the situation had grown past the government's control as Syria and other countries began interfering and complicating the situation. On 5 March 1980, Sarkis developed his policy as part of his attempts to create national accord: unity, independence, and parliamentary democracy, rejecting the Camp David Accords between Egypt and Israel.
7		Bachir Gemayel بشير الجميل (1947–1982)	23 August 1982	14 September 1982†	22 days	Kataeb Party	Was elected during the peak of the Lebanese Civil War. Soon after his election, fighters from the Lebanese Forces were prohibited from wearing their uniforms and also from carrying their weapons in the streets. He notably had close relations with Israel, which led to his assassination in an explosion that killed more than thirty people by SSNP member Habib Shartouni. He was assassinated before officially taking office.
7		Bachir Gemayel بشير الجميل (1947–1982)	August 1982			Kataeb Party	Was elected during the peak of the Lebanese Civil War. Soon after his election, fighters from the Lebanese Forces were prohibited from wearing their uniforms and also from carrying their weapons in the streets. He notably had close relations with Israel, which led to his assassination in an explosion that killed more than thirty people by SSNP member Habib Shartouni. He was assassinated before officially taking office.
8		Amine Gemayel أمين الجميل (born 1942)	23 September 1982	22 September 1988	6 years	Kataeb Party	He left his post in the Kataeb Party after being elected president. Once elected, he refused to meet any Israeli official. With foreign armies occupying two-thirds of the country (Syria in the north and east, Israel in the south) and private armies independent of government control occupying most of the rest, Gemayel's government lacked any power. He re-organized the Lebanese Army, receiving support from the Multinational Force in Lebanon, and reached the May 17 Agreement with Israel in 1983 despite fierce internal opposition, which stipulated the withdrawal of the Israeli forces and the end of the state of war between the two countries, but did not ratify it.
8		Amine Gemayel أمين الجميل (born 1942)	September 1982			Kataeb Party	
—		Salim Al-Huss سليم الحص (1929–2024)	22 September 1988	5 November 1989	1 year, 44 days	Independent	Gemayel decided to appoint Maronite army commander Michel Aoun to the office, notwithstanding the tradition of reserving it for a Sunni Muslim. Hoss refused to concede the prime minister's post to Aoun, so the two ended up heading rival administrations, with Aoun occupying the presidential palace at Baabda and Hoss establishing his own office in Muslim-dominated West Beirut.
—		Michel Aoun ميشال عون (born 1935)	22 September 1988	13 October 1990	2 years, 21 days	Military	The outgoing president Amine Gemayel appointed Aoun as prime minister, heading a military government formed by six members of the Martial Court, three of which are Christian and three Muslim. He also dismissed the civilian administration of acting Prime Minister Selim Hoss. The Muslims refused to serve and submitted their resignations on the next day. He controlled his own military faction, which was heavily based in East Beirut.
(Lebanon) Second Lebanese Republic
9		René Moawad رينيه معوض (1925–1989)	5 November 1989	22 November 1989†	17 days	Independent	Moawad served as the minister of posts and telecommunications (1961–1964), minister of public works (1969), and minister of national education and fine arts (1980–1982). His presidency was disputed by military general Michel Aoun. Seventeen days after being elected, as he was returning from Lebanon's Independence Day celebrations, a 250 kg car bomb was detonated next to Moawad's motorcade in West Beirut, killing him and 23 others.
9		René Moawad رينيه معوض (1925–1989)	5 November 1989			Independent	Moawad served as the minister of posts and telecommunications (1961–1964), minister of public works (1969), and minister of national education and fine arts (1980–1982). His presidency was disputed by military general Michel Aoun. Seventeen days after being elected, as he was returning from Lebanon's Independence Day celebrations, a 250 kg car bomb was detonated next to Moawad's motorcade in West Beirut, killing him and 23 others.
Vacant (22 November 1989 – 24 November 1989)
10		Elias Hrawi إلياس الهراوي (1926–2006)	24 November 1989	24 November 1998	9 years	Independent	Hrawi served as minister of public works and was a member of the independent Maronite Catholic bloc in the Parliament. Hrawi was elected at the Park Hotel in Chtoura by 47 out of 53 members of two days after the murder of Lebanese President René Mouawad. As president, Hrawi signed into law amendments to the constitution that formalized the Taif Agreement reforms. He saw the end of the Lebanese Civil War. He signed the treaty of fraternity, co-ordination, and co-operation with Syria, in which Lebanon promised not to allow its territory to be used against Syria's interests.
10		Elias Hrawi إلياس الهراوي (1926–2006)	24 November 1989			Independent	
11		Émile Lahoud إميل لحود (born 1936)	24 November 1998	24 November 2007	9 years	Independent (Note: Elected in a constitutional amendment while serving as the Commander of the Lebanese Armed Forces.)	Lahoud ran for the presidency in 1998 after having the constitution amended to allow the army commander-in-chief to run for office. This amendment is believed to have been backed by Syria. When he became president in 1998, he aligned himself with Hezbollah and picked his own man as prime minister, Selim Hoss. This led to heightened tensions between Rafiq Hariri and Lahoud. During his term, he exerted more control over government decision-making than Prime Minister Rafiq Hariri or Parliament Speaker Nabih Berri. In August 2001, he modified the limits on the executive authority of the presidency stipulated in the 1989 Ta'if Accord and ordered security forces to launch a massive arrest sweep against nationalist dissidents without informing Hariri and other cabinet ministers.
11		Émile Lahoud إميل لحود (born 1936)	1998			Independent	
Vacant (24 November 2007 – 25 May 2008)
12		Michel Suleiman ميشال سليمان (born 1948)	25 May 2008	25 May 2014	6 years	Independent	Suleiman was the commander of the Lebanese Armed Forces (1998–2008). Lebanese political spectrum was deeply polarized, with virtually all parties being divided, either in the government loyalists or the opposition, which paved way for the non-partisan Michel Suleiman to be elected by parliament. Suleiman launched the table of national dialogue at the Presidential Palace in Baabda on 16 September 2008, in pursuance of the Doha Agreement's articles and in view of consolidating National Reconciliation and Entente.
12		Michel Suleiman ميشال سليمان (born 1948)	2008			Independent	
Vacant (25 May 2014 – 31 October 2016)
13		Michel Aoun ميشال عون (born 1935)	31 October 2016	31 October 2022	6 years	Free Patriotic Movement	Aoun was the commander of the Lebanese Armed Forces (1984–1989), held a disputed military presidency and premiership (1988–1990) and leader of the Free Patriotic Movement. From the expiration of the term of President Michel Suleiman on 25 May 2014 until 31 October 2016, the parliament was unable to obtain the majority required to elect a president, and the office was vacant for almost two and a half years, despite more than 30 votes being held. On 31 October 2016, the parliament finally elected Michel Aoun as president after an agreement was signed between the leader of the Free Patriotic Movement Gebran Bassil, and the leader of the Lebanese Forces Samir Geagea at the latter's headquarters in Maarab, which required Samir Geagea, who had withdrawn from the presidential race, to endorse Michel Aoun's candidacy for the 2016 presidential election, years after a long rivalry that went back to the Lebanese Civil War.
13		Michel Aoun ميشال عون (born 1935)	2014–2016			Free Patriotic Movement	
Vacant (31 October 2022 – 9 January 2025)
14		Joseph Aoun جوزاف عون (born 1964)	9 January 2025	Incumbent	1 year, 195 days	Independent	Aoun is the fifth army commander turned president. Aoun was previously a commander in the Lebanese Commando Regiment, head of the 9th Infantry Brigade, and commander of the Lebanese Armed Forces. From the expiration of the term of President Michel Aoun on 31 October 2022 until 9 January 2025, parliament were unable to obtain a majority required in electing a president, leaving the office vacant for two and a half years. Aoun was eventually elected after foreign mediation led by Saudi Arabia.
14		Joseph Aoun جوزاف عون (born 1964)	2022–2025			Independent	Aoun is the fifth army commander turned president. Aoun was previously a commander in the Lebanese Commando Regiment, head of the 9th Infantry Brigade, and commander of the Lebanese Armed Forces. From the expiration of the term of President Michel Aoun on 31 October 2022 until 9 January 2025, parliament were unable to obtain a majority required in electing a president, leaving the office vacant for two and a half years. Aoun was eventually elected after foreign mediation led by Saudi Arabia.

== Birthplaces ==
Birthplaces of presidents of Lebanon.

== See also ==
- List of prime ministers of Lebanon
- List of speakers of the Parliament of Lebanon
- President of Lebanon
- Prime Minister of Lebanon
- High Commissioner of the Levant
