= List of elections in 1982 =

The following elections occurred in the year 1982.

== Africa ==
- 1982 Algerian parliamentary election
- 1982 Burundian legislative election
- 1982 Comorian legislative election
- 1982 Djiboutian parliamentary election
- 1982 Equatorial Guinean constitutional referendum
- 1982 Gambian general election
- 1982 Guinean presidential election
- 1982 Malagasy presidential election
- 1982 Malian parliamentary election
- 1982 Mauritian general election
- 1982 Sierra Leonean parliamentary election
- 1981–82 Sudanese parliamentary election
- 1982 Zairean parliamentary election

== Asia ==
- August 1982 Lebanese presidential election
- September 1982 Lebanese presidential election
- 1982 Indonesian legislative election
- 1982 Malaysian general election
- 1982 North Korean parliamentary election
- 1982 Philippine barangay election
- 1982 Sri Lankan presidential election
- 1982 Sri Lankan national referendum

=== India ===
- 1982 Indian presidential election

== Australia ==
- 1982 Flinders by-election
- 1982 Florey state by-election
- 1982 Lowe by-election
- 1982 Mitcham state by-election
- 1982 Nedlands state by-election
- 1982 South Australian state election
- 1982 Tasmanian state election
- 1982 Victorian state election

== Europe ==
- 1982 Albanian parliamentary election
- 1982 Dutch general election
- 1982 Finnish presidential election
- February 1982 Irish general election
- November 1982 Irish general election
- 1982 Liechtenstein general election
- 1982 Portuguese local election
- 1982 Romanian local elections
- 1982 Stockholm municipal election
- 1982 Swedish general election
- 1982 Swiss referendums
- 1982 Turkish constitutional referendum
- 1982 Yugoslavian parliamentary election

=== France ===
- 1982 French cantonal elections

=== Spain ===
- 1982 Spanish general election

== North America ==
- 1982 Bahamian general election
- 1982 Costa Rican general election
- 1982 Dominican Republic general election
- 1982 Guatemalan general election
- 1982 Mexican general election
- 1982 Salvadoran Constitutional Assembly election
- 1982 Salvadoran presidential election
- 1982 Saint Lucian general election

=== Canada ===
- 1982 Alberta general election
- 1982 Brantford municipal election
- 1982 New Brunswick general election
- 1982 Newfoundland general election
- 1982 Northwest Territories division plebiscite
- 1982 Ontario municipal elections
- 1982 Ottawa municipal election
- 1982 Prince Edward Island general election
- 1982 Saskatchewan general election
- 1982 Toronto municipal election
- 1982 Yukon general election

=== United States ===
- 1982 United States elections

==== United States lieutenant gubernatorial ====
- 1982 California lieutenant gubernatorial election
- 1982 Georgia lieutenant gubernatorial election
- 1982 Texas lieutenant gubernatorial election

==== United States gubernatorial ====
- 1982 Alabama gubernatorial election
- 1982 Alaska gubernatorial election
- 1982 Arizona gubernatorial election
- 1982 Arkansas gubernatorial election
- 1982 California gubernatorial election
- 1982 Colorado gubernatorial election
- 1982 Connecticut gubernatorial election
- 1982 Florida gubernatorial election
- 1982 Georgia gubernatorial election
- 1982 Hawaii gubernatorial election
- 1982 Idaho gubernatorial election
- 1982 Iowa gubernatorial election
- 1982 Kansas gubernatorial election
- 1982 Maine gubernatorial election
- 1982 Maryland gubernatorial election
- 1982 Massachusetts gubernatorial election
- 1982 Michigan gubernatorial election
- 1982 Minnesota gubernatorial election
- 1982 Nebraska gubernatorial election
- 1982 Nevada gubernatorial election
- 1982 New Hampshire gubernatorial election
- 1982 New Mexico gubernatorial election
- 1982 New York gubernatorial election
- 1982 Ohio gubernatorial election
- 1982 Oklahoma gubernatorial election
- 1982 Oregon gubernatorial election
- 1982 Pennsylvania gubernatorial election
- 1982 Rhode Island gubernatorial election
- 1982 South Carolina gubernatorial election
- 1982 South Dakota gubernatorial election
- 1982 Tennessee gubernatorial election
- 1982 Texas gubernatorial election
- 1982 United States gubernatorial elections
- 1982 Vermont gubernatorial election
- 1982 Wisconsin gubernatorial election
- 1982 Wyoming gubernatorial election

==== United States House of Representatives ====
- 1982 United States House of Representatives elections
- 1982 United States House of Representatives election in Alaska
- 1982 United States House of Representatives election in Delaware
- 1982 United States House of Representatives election in North Dakota
- 1982 United States House of Representatives election in Vermont
- 1982 United States House of Representatives election in Wyoming

==== United States Senate ====
- 1982 United States Senate elections
- 1982 United States Senate election in Arizona
- 1982 United States Senate election in California
- 1982 United States Senate election in Connecticut
- 1982 United States Senate election in Delaware
- 1982 United States Senate election in Florida
- 1982 United States Senate election in Hawaii
- 1982 United States Senate election in Indiana
- 1982 United States Senate election in Maine
- 1982 United States Senate election in Maryland
- 1982 United States Senate election in Massachusetts
- 1982 United States Senate election in Michigan
- 1982 United States Senate election in Minnesota
- 1982 United States Senate election in Mississippi
- 1982 United States Senate election in Missouri
- 1982 United States Senate election in Montana
- 1982 United States Senate election in Nebraska
- 1982 United States Senate election in Nevada
- 1982 United States Senate election in New Jersey
- 1982 United States Senate election in New Mexico
- 1982 United States Senate election in New York
- 1982 United States Senate election in North Dakota
- 1982 United States Senate election in Ohio
- 1982 United States Senate election in Pennsylvania
- 1982 United States Senate election in Rhode Island
- 1982 United States Senate election in Tennessee
- 1982 United States Senate election in Texas
- 1982 United States Senate election in Vermont
- 1982 United States Senate election in Virginia
- 1982 United States Senate election in West Virginia
- 1982 United States Senate election in Wyoming

==== United States mayoral elections ====
- 1982 Auburn, Alabama municipal elections
- 1982 New Orleans mayoral election
- 1982 San Jose mayoral election
- 1982 Washington, D.C., mayoral election

== Oceania ==
- 1982 Fijian general election
- 1982 Kiribati parliamentary election
- 1982 Kiribati presidential election
- 1982 Papua New Guinean general election
- 1982 Western Samoan general election

=== Australia ===
- 1982 Drummoyne state by-election
- 1982 Flinders by-election
- 1982 Florey state by-election
- 1982 Lowe by-election
- 1982 Mitcham state by-election
- 1982 Nedlands state by-election
- 1982 South Australian state election
- 1982 Tasmanian state election
- 1982 Victorian state election
