= Lebanese Independence Day =

Public holiday in Lebanon

Independence Day عيد الاستقلال
- Observed by: Lebanon
- Celebrations: Military parades, displaying the flag of Lebanon, fireworks, concerts and general celebration of Lebanese heritage
- Date: 22 November
- Frequency: Annual

Lebanese Independence Day (Arabic: عيد الاستقلال اللبناني, romanized: ʿĪd al-Istiqlāl al-Lubnānī, lit. 'Festival of the Lebanese Independence') is the national day of Lebanon, celebrated on 22 November in commemoration of the end of the French control over Lebanon in 1943, after 23 years of Mandate rule.

== Pre-Independence period ==
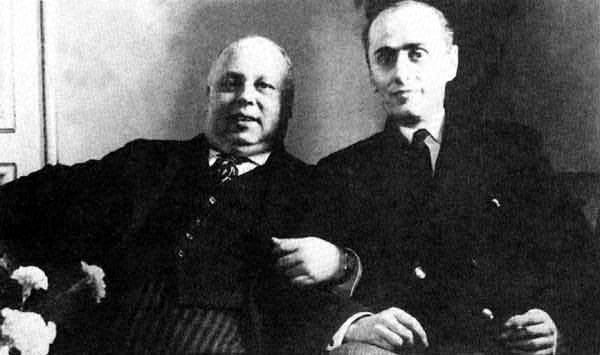
Lebanese President Alfred Naqqache (right) pictured with President Taj al-Din al-Hasani of Syria. Both men were French appointees.

While the Lebanese have been in a constant struggle for independence from foreign powers since the age of the Old Testament, the modern struggle for Lebanese independence can be traced back to the emergence of Fakhr-al-Din II in the late 16th century, a Druze chief who became the first local leader in a thousand years to bring the major sects of Mount Lebanon into sustained mutual interaction. Fakhr-al-Din also brought western Europe back to Mount Lebanon. The French traveler Laurent d'Arvieux observed massive French commercial buildings in Sidon, Fakhr-al-Din's political centre, where bustling crowds of Muslims, Maronites, Orthodox Christians, Druze and Jews intermingled. Under his rule, printing presses were introduced and Jesuit priests and Catholic nuns encouraged to open schools throughout the land. Fakhr-al-Din's growing influence, disobedience and ambitions threatened Ottoman interests. Ottoman Turkish troops captured Fakhr-al-Din and had him executed in Istanbul in 1635.

In response to a massacre of Maronites by Druze during the 1860 civil war, 6000 French troops landed near Beirut, ostensibly to protect the Maronite communities. The Ottoman Sultan, Abdulmejid I, had no choice but to approve the French landing at Beirut and review the status of Mount Lebanon. In 1861, the Ottomans and five European powers (Britain, France, Russia, Austria, and Prussia) negotiated a new political system for Mount Lebanon in a commission chaired by Mehmed Fuad Pasha, the Ottoman Foreign Minister. The international commission established a tribunal to punish the Druze lords for war crimes and the commission further agreed on an autonomous province of Mount Lebanon, the Mount Lebanon Mutasarrifate. In September 1864, the Ottomans and Europeans signed the Règlement Organique defining the new entity, including the French recommendation of an elected multi-communal council to advise the governor.

Electoral representation and rough demographic weighting of communal membership was established after the foundation of the autonomous Mount Lebanon province. A two-stage electoral process became refined over several decades, with secret balloting introduced in 1907. Mount Lebanon became the only Ottoman provincial council that was democratically elected, representing members of the major sects. Elections for one-third of the council seats took place every two years. The governor of Mount Lebanon, a non-Maronite Catholic from outside, was of Ottoman ministerial rank with the title Pasha, though a step below a full provincial governor. Presiding judges of district courts were from the same sect as the largest religious group in the district, with deputy judges representing the next two largest groups. Court decisions had to involve the Court President and at least one other judge. This system facilitated Maronite acquiescence, Druze re-integration and sectarian reconciliation in Mount Lebanon.

With the onset of World War I, the Ottoman Sultanate began to disintegrate. The Ottomans feared Arab independence. In response, the Ottomans abolished the autonomous province of Mount Lebanon in 1915, putting the mountain communities under emergency military rule. The repression culminated on 6 May 1916, with the hanging of 14 activists and journalists, including proponents of both Arab and Lebanese independence, Christians and Muslims, clerics and secularists. The location of the hangings in central Beirut became known as Martyrs' Square, today the focal point of public Lebanese political expression. Respect for Ottoman authority in the local community collapsed after this event. The Ottomans confiscated grain from the Levant during the war, resulting in a massive famine. Half the population of Mount Lebanon was wiped out. Both Schilcher and Khalife estimated up to 200,000 deaths in the mountain.

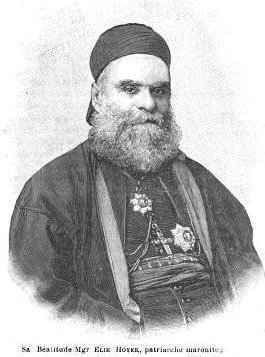
Patriarch Elias al-Huwayyik in 1899.

=== A Phoenician identity ===
After the Turks were expelled from the Levant at the end of World War I, the Syrian National Congress in Damascus proclaimed independence and sovereignty over a region that also included Lebanon in 1920. In Beirut, the Christian press expressed its hostility to the decisions of the Syrian National Congress. Lebanese nationalists used the crisis to convene a council of Christian figures in Baabda that proclaimed the independence of Lebanon on 22 March 1920. Despite these declarations, the region was divided among the victorious British and French according to the Sykes–Picot Agreement, a secret 1916 pact of the UK and France.

Mount Lebanon Maronites under the Maronite Patriarch Elias al-Huwayyik lobbied the French for an enlarged Lebanon to become a Catholic Christian homeland. Patriarch al-Huwayyik shrewdly conflated a new Lebanon with ancient Phoenicia to highlight a unique personality. The Phoenician allusion derived from a European passion for romanticizing antiquity (see Ernest Renan's Mission de Phénicie, 1864). Among the wider public, the resurrection of Phoenicia and the concept of a distinctive Lebanon received stimulus from the literary output of Jibran Khalil Jibran. Jibran drew out feelings of oppression and conflict with established religion and interpersonal tensions. These themes resonated with a multi-sectarian Lebanon. Jibran's combination of Christian ambience with outreach to Muslims reinforced Lebanese nationalist thought. Incorporation of Jibran into school curricula in the 1920s helped make him by far Lebanon's most influential writer.

Greater Lebanon from Ra's Naqura in the south to Nahr al-Kabir north of Tripoli, and from the coast to the Anti-Lebanon mountains was established under the French provisional mandate in April 1920. Patriarch al-Huwayyik, with the Ottoman imposed famine in recent memory, insisted on the acquisition of the Biqa valley, a principal food producing area. The French were supposed to guide the population to self-determination with regular progress reports to the League of Nations. In reality, the French arrested and suppressed proponents of self-determination at various times.

France confirmed the electoral system of the former Ottoman Mount Lebanon province in setting up a Representative Council for Greater Lebanon in 1922. Two stage elections, universal adult male suffrage, and multimember multi-communal constituencies continued the situation that prevailed in Mount Lebanon up to 1914.

The brief term (November 1925-August 1926) of the first civilian High Commissioner, French senator and journalist Henry de Jouvenel, proved decisive in the history of the Lebanese republic. A newly elected Representative Council became the clearinghouse for Lebanese input, and de Jouvenel endorsed it as the de facto constituent assembly. The Representative Council delegated drafting of a constitution to a twelve-member committee. The concept of Greater Lebanon as a Christian/Muslim partnership distinct from its Arab hinterland underpinned the project. The leading lights of the committee were non-Maronite Christians - Michel Chiha, Orthodox chairman Shibli Dammus and the Orthodox Petro Grad. They adapted the 1875 French constitution, and De Jouvenal hastened the Representative Council to enact the draft in May 1926. It included a republic, executive power shared between the President and Prime Minister, a two-chamber legislature, equitable multi-communal representation, and Greater Lebanon as the final homeland of its inhabitants.

The Franco-Lebanese Treaty of 1936 promised complete independence and membership within the League of Nations within three years. The conservative French National Assembly refused to ratify the Treaty.

When the Vichy government assumed power over French territory in 1940, General Henri Fernand Dentz was appointed as High Commissioner of Lebanon. This new turning point led to the resignation of Lebanese president Emile Edde on 4 April 1941. After 5 days, Dentz appointed Alfred Naccache for a presidency period that lasted only 3 months and ending with the surrender of the Vichy forces posted in Lebanon and Syria to the Free French and British troops. On 14 July 1941, an armistice was signed in Acre ending the clashes between the two sides and opening the way for General Charles de Gaulle's visit to Lebanon, thus ending Vichy's control.

Having the opportunity to discuss matters of sovereignty and independence, the Lebanese national leaders asked de Gaulle to end the French Mandate and unconditionally recognize Lebanon's independence. After national and international pressure, General Georges Catroux (a delegate general under de Gaulle) proclaimed in the name of his government the Lebanese independence on 26 November 1941. Countries such as the United States, the United Kingdom, the Arab states, the Soviet Union, and certain Asian countries recognized this independence, and some of them even exchanged ambassadors with Beirut. However this didn't stop the French from exercising their authority.

On 8 November 1943, and after electing president Bechara El Khoury and appointing prime minister Riad al-Solh, the Chamber of Deputies amended the Lebanese Constitution, which abolished the articles referring to the Mandate and modified the specified powers of the High Commissioner, thus unilaterally ending the Mandate. The French responded by arresting the President, the Prime Minister, and other cabinet members, and exiling them to an old citadel located in Rashaya. This incident, which unified the Christian and Muslim opinion towards the mandate, led to an international pressure demanding the Lebanese leaders' release and massive street protests.

== Government of Bechamoun ==
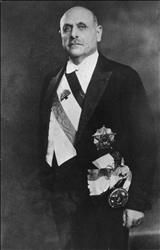
Bechara El Khoury (official portrait).

After the imprisonment of the Lebanese officials, the Lebanese MPs reunited in the house of the speaker of parliament, Sabri Hamadé, and assigned the two uncaught ministers Emir Majid Arslan (Minister of National Defence) and Habib Abou Chahla to carry out the functions of the government. The two ministers then moved to Bechamoun and their government became known as the Government of Bechamoun. The Government was provided shelter and protection in the residences of Hussein and Youssef El Halabi, recognized leaders in Bechamoun. These residences were strategically located, providing optimum protection to the ministers.

The newly formed government refused to hold talks with General Catroux or any other mandate official, stressing that any negotiation should be done with the captured government. It also formed a military resistance under the name of the "National Guard" led by Emir Majid and Naim Moghabghab, with the help of Adib el Beainy and Munir Takieddine.

Finally, France yielded to the augmenting pressure of the Lebanese people, as well as the demand of numerous countries and released the prisoners from Rashaya Citadel in the morning of Monday 22 November 1943. Since then, this day has been celebrated as the Lebanese Independence Day.

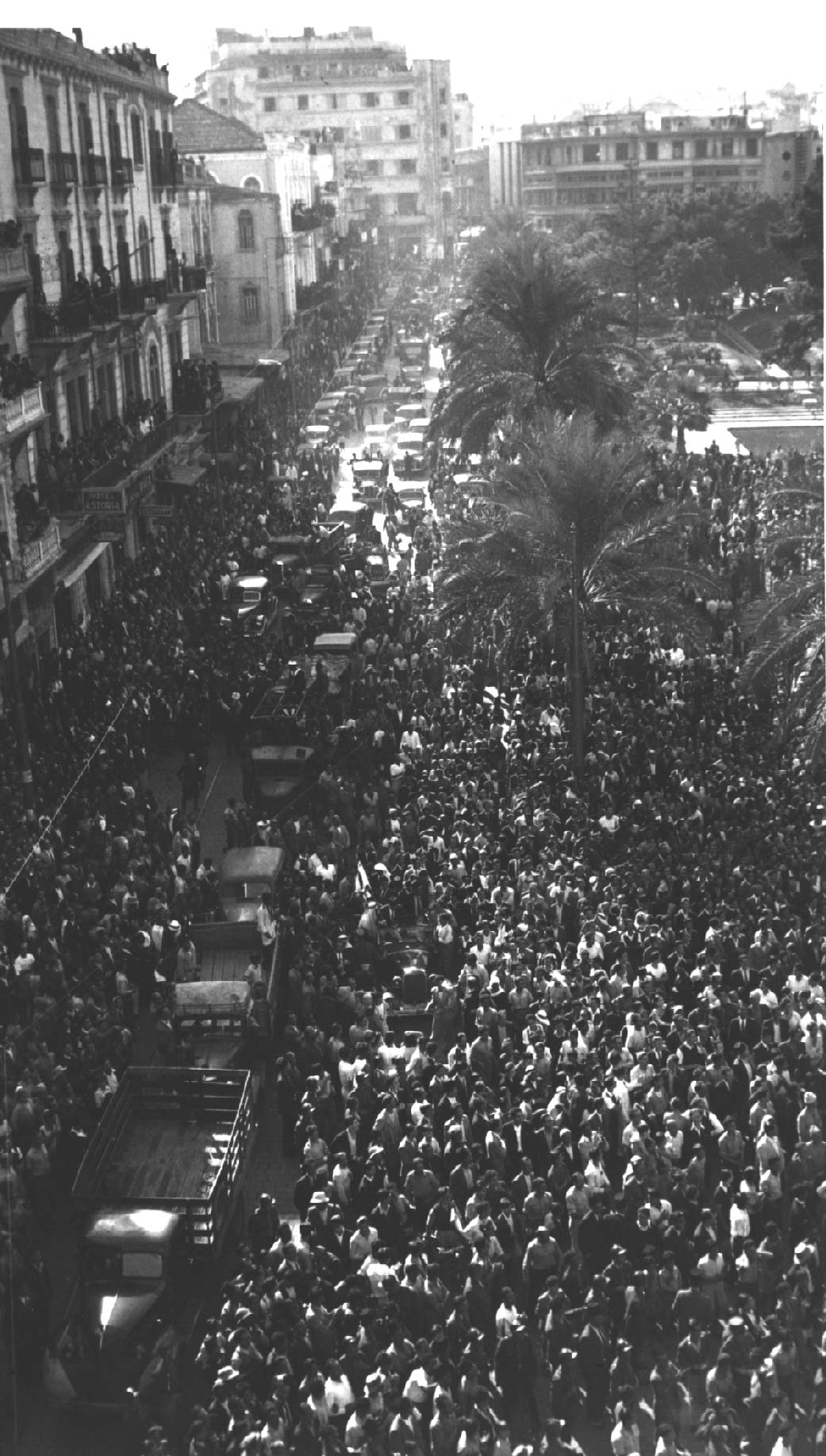
Celebrations in Martyrs' Square in Beirut after the release of the Lebanese political leaders.

This historic site of Lebanese independence and residence of Hussein El Halabi, where the first Lebanese flag was raised on 11 November 1943, continues to welcome tourists and visitors throughout the year to celebrate national pride.

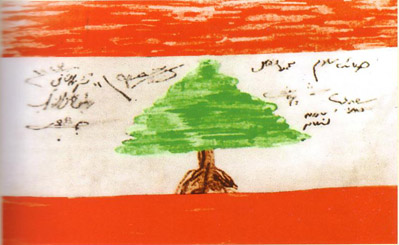
Flag as drawn and approved by the members of the Lebanese Parliament during the declaration of independence in 1943.

== Post-Independence period ==
After the independence, the modern Lebanese political system was founded in 1943 by an unwritten agreement between the two most prominent Christian and Muslim leaders, Khouri and al-Solh and which was later called the National Pact (al Mithaq al Watani الميثاق الوطني ).

The National Pact had four principles:

1. Lebanon was to be a completely politically independent state. Lebanon would not enter into Western-led alignments; in return, Lebanon would not compromise its sovereignty with Arab states.
2. Lebanon would have an Arab face and another for the West, as it could not cut off its spiritual and intellectual ties with the West, which had helped it attain such a notable degree of progress.
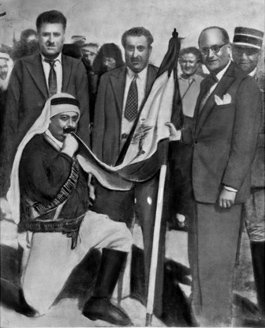
3. Sabri Hamadé and Majid Arslan with the Lebanese flag
  Lebanon, as a member of the family of Arab states, should cooperate with the other Arab states where possible, and in case of conflict among them, it should not side with one state against another.
4. Public offices should be distributed proportionally among the recognized religious groups, but in technical positions preference should be given to competence without regard to confessional considerations. Moreover, the three top government positions should be distributed as follows: the president of the republic should be a Maronite and the prime minister, a Sunni Muslim. The speaker of the Chamber of Deputies was reserved for a Shi'i Muslim in 1947. The ratio of deputies was to be six Christians to five Muslims.

In 1945, Lebanon became a founding member of the Arab League (22 March) and a founding member of the United Nations (1945 UN San Francisco Conference). On 31 December 1946, French troops withdrew completely from Lebanon.

== See also ==
- History of Lebanon
- San Remo conference
- France–Lebanon relations
