= Nebi Safa =

Nebi Safa Nabi Safa, An Nabi Safa', En Nabi Safa, Mazraet Selsata, Thelthatha
- Village
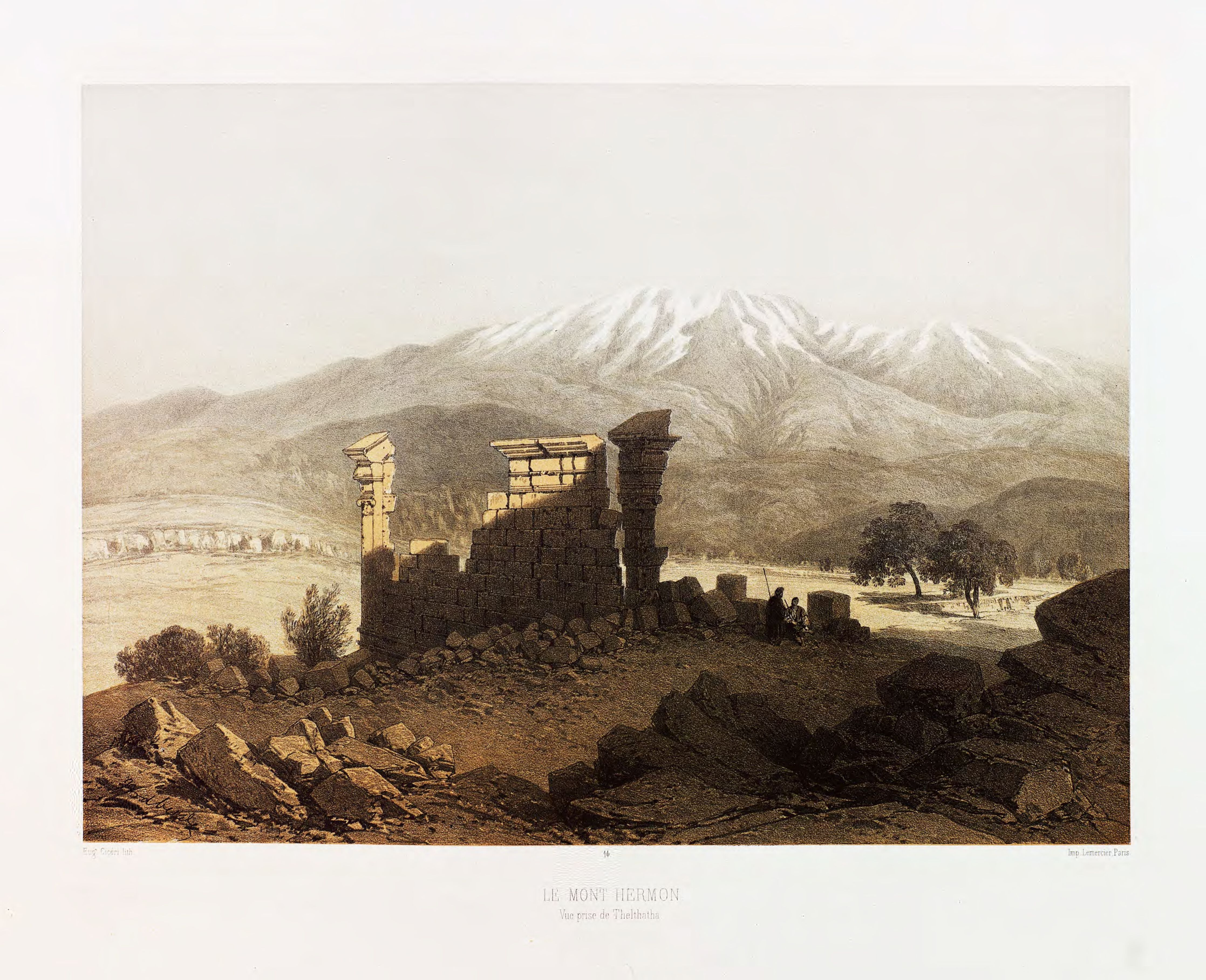
- The temple ruins at Nebi Safa, ca 1851, by van de Velde
- Interactive map of Nebi Safa
- Country: Lebanon
- Governorate: Beqaa Governorate
- District: Rashaya District

Nebi Safa
- Nabi Safa, An Nabi Safa', En Nabi Safa, Thelthatha
- Location within Lebanon
- Cultures: Roman
- Location: 13 kilometres (8.1 mi) west of Rashaya

Site notes
- Condition: Ruins
- Public access: Yes

Nebi Safa, Nabi Safa, Neby Sufa, An Nabi Safa, An Nabi Safa' or En Nabi Safa (Arabic: النبي صفا, romanized: an-Nabī Ṣafā), also known as Mazraet Selsata or Thelthatha, is a village in the Kfar Mishki municipality situated 13 kilometres (8.1 mi) west of Rashaya in the Rashaya District of the Beqaa Governorate in Lebanon.

The village is situated in a gap in a ridge overlooking the Wadi Al-Taym between the Merj Shemiseh and is predominantly occupied by Druze. It was visited by Edward Robinson in 1852, who noted two sarcophagi (roman temples) in the area.

== Roman temple ==
There are the ruins of a Roman temple in the village that is included in a group of Temples of Mount Hermon. It is larger than the one at Hebbariye, measuring 72 feet (22 m) long (from east to west) and 35 feet (11 m) wide (from north to south). It faces east with a commanding aspect towards Mount Hermon. It was noted that the view "of Hermon from this point is imposing beyond the power of language to express". George Taylor noted that the doorway of the temple was at least thirty degrees offset from the peak. The stone blocks used to make the temple were around 3 feet (0.91 m) thick, not as large as those at Hebbariye and with a lighter entablature of 4.5 feet (1.4 m). It feature an elegant pediment with graceful architecture. Only the northern wall remains standing with pilasters in the northeast corner. The east entrance featured 3 feet (0.91 m) thick columns that possibly formed a portico. At the west end of the temple is an altar with stairs leading down to an underground chamber or crypt that runs for the length of the temple. Thirteen courses of stones were recorded by Robinson to a height of 43.5 feet (13.3 m).

The site was suggested to have been used by the Druze as a shrine to a prophet called Safa, who was descended from Jacob and whose people lived towards Hebron and Jerusalem. Little record of the prophet Safa remains, although it was said that "The honourable body is there, and the spirit is always to be found there. Any day that a man seeks him he will find him, it depends on his faith."

== Bibliography ==
- Warren, C.; Conder, C.R. (1884). The Survey of Western Palestine: Jerusalem. London: Committee of the Palestine Exploration Fund. (p. 491 ff)
