= 1936 Lebanese presidential election =

← 1929	20 January 1936	1943 →

25 members of the Parliament 13 votes needed to win
- Turnout: 100%
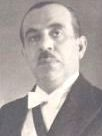

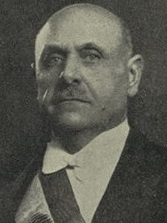
Nominee	Émile Eddé	Bechara El Khoury
Party	National Bloc	Constitutional Bloc
Electoral vote	15	10
Percentage	60%	40%
President before election
Habib Pacha Saad
Independent
Elected President
Émile Eddé
National Bloc

The 1936 Lebanese presidential election was the third presidential election, which was held during a parliamentary session on 20 January 1936. The Nationalist Émile Eddé defeated the Constitutional Bechara El Khoury. He took office as the third president of Greater Lebanon and the second elected one after Charles Debbas, who was elected in 1926 and 1929.

The President is elected by the Members of Parliament. He needs a two-thirds majority to win in the first round, while an absolute majority is enough in the second round.

All 25 Members of the Parliament attended the session, including Eddé and El Khoury, and voted in two rounds. Eddé won the first one with 14 votes against 11 for El Khoury. In the second round however, 15 deputies elected Eddé, which was enough for him to become the next President.

Candidate	Votes	%
Émile Eddé	15	60.00
Bechara El Khoury	10	40.00
Total	25	100.00
Blank votes	0	0.00
Total votes	25	–
Registered voters/turnout	25	100.00
