= Kfarmishki =

Kfarmishki كفرمشكي
- Village
- Location in Lebanon
- Coordinates: 33°30′53″N 35°45′58″E
- Country: Lebanon
- Governorate: Beqaa Governorate
- District: Rashaya District

Kfarmishki (Arabic: كفرمشكي, romanized: Kfarmishkī, also spelled Kfar Mishki or Kfar Mechki), is a small mountain authority in the Rashaya District of the Beqaa Governate in Lebanon. This village is located approximately 92 km southeast of Beirut and lies at an altitude of 950–1350 m above sea level on the western slope of Mount Hermon (Arabic: جبل الشيخ) within the Anti-Lebanon mountain range.

== Geography and climate ==
The village proper is located on a crest with a splendid view of Mount Hermon and overlooks its extensive land holdings consisting of plateaus, small hills, and depressions that contain numerous caves and rock shelters. While some of this land is fertile, a significant portion of it has been, and unfortunately continues to be, severely degraded by the grazing of goats, which provide villagers with milk and meat. Some of this damage has been reversed in small protected areas that have been forested with trees of oak, cedar, and pine. Due to its location and altitude, the village and surrounding area are characterized by a semi-arid environment: dry and sun-drenched for seven months of the year with precipitation in the form of rain in late fall to early spring and snow in winter.

== Etymology ==
According to Anis Frayha's book “A Dictionary of the Names of Towns and Villages in Lebanon", the name Kfarmishki is derived from Syriac (“Kfar” ܟܦܪ= village and “mishki” ܡܫܟܝ = leather) and means “leather village” or “tannery village”. This meaning suggests that a major activity of the village in previous eras was leather tanning or at least providing raw animal hides for tanning in nearby villages such as Machghara (Arabic: مشغرة), which still houses some of the largest tanneries in present-day Lebanon. Certainly, leather working and tanning have been practiced in the levant for millennia. The inhabitants of ancient Phoenicia, which was located primarily in the area now occupied by modern Lebanon, were particularly skilled at leather working and, according to the Greek historian Strabo, even developed a method for making water pipes from leather.

== Demographics ==
In 1838, during the Ottoman era, Eli Smith noted the population of Kfarmishki as being Sunni Muslim and "Greek" Christians, now known as Greek Orthodox Christians. At present, the population is largely Christian, predominantly Greek Orthodox, with a Sunni minority. The year-round population numbers just under 500 villagers and is augmented in summer months by expatriate families returning from their adopted countries, mainly Canada.

== History ==
=== Ancient history ===
==== The Prehistoric Era ====
The Kfarmishki area, like the rest of the Levant, has been inhabited for millennia. Archaeological sites were discovered within 2 km of Kfarmishki village proper in the 1950s and 1960s by Jesuit Priests, particularly Henri Fleisch and Jacques Cauvin. Artifacts typical of the Paleolithic era (which lasted from approximately 1.5 million years ago to approximately 200,000 years ago), as well as Neolithic artifacts belonging to the Heavy Neolithic Qaraoun culture dating from approximately 4,000 years BC were found in abundance in the vicinity of Kaukaba (Arabic: كوكبا) and in Ard Es-Saouda (Arabic: ارض السودا). Other Neolithic sites were also found a little further afield near Dahr Al-ahmar (Arabic: ظهر الاحمر) and Rashaya (Arabic: راشيا).

The Ard Es-Saouda site, located 2 km east of Kfarmishki and part of which is owned by Kfarmishki villagers, has been well studied. The area sits on an ancient basaltic lava flow dating to the Pliocene epoch (approximately 5.4 - 2.4 million years ago). As a result, it is rich in black basalt boulders and it was the decomposition of this flow which produced the dark fertile soil that gives the area its name (Arabic: ارض السودا; French: Terres Noires; meaning Black Earth). The Neolithic artifacts were found on the surface of fields at this site and consisted mainly of flint axes, chisels, scrapers, and picks. Many of the flint picks were badly worn and reduced to small stumps, suggesting that they were used to drill holes, not in wood, but in basalt implements, possibly to make holes for handles in agricultural tools such as hoes. The artifacts collected at Ard Es-Saouda are now housed in the Museum of Lebanese Prehistory at Saint Joseph University in Beirut.

==== The Roman Era ====
There is ample evidence for Roman-era settlements in the Kfarmishki area. Upon visiting the village in 1852, the biblical scholar Edward Robinson noted the existence of two Roman sarcophagi, and still standing a few kilometers from the village, are the badly damaged ruins of a Roman temple, now known as Nabi Safa, which was part of the Temples of Mount Hermon. Additionally, remnants of Roman-era columns and their sculpted capitals have been found in the village proper (see photo).

=== The Nineteenth and Twentieth Centuries ===
In the late nineteenth and early twentieth centuries, massive waves of migration from Lebanon were spurred by major conflicts in the region, particularly the 1860 Mount Lebanon civil war (also called the 1860 Syrian Civil War), the 1925 Great Druze Revolt (also known as the Great Syrian Revolt, and the 1975-1990 Lebanese Civil War. Migrants left to escape these conflicts, in search of political stability, freedoms, and better economic opportunities. Another impetus for migration in the late nineteenth and early twentieth centuries was to evade conscription into Ottoman armies, especially after 1911 when the Ottoman Empire entered World War I in the Balkans. These early migrants reached their destinations penniless and not knowing the country's language. Yet they were able to build successful businesses, which allowed them to send remittances to the families they left behind in Lebanon. The story of Lebanese migrants was celebrated by the Lebanese American poet and philosopher Gibran Khalil Gibran (Arabic: جبران خليل جبران, known in English as Kahlil Gibran): “Let me tell you who are the children of my Lebanon… They are those who migrate with nothing but courage in their hearts and strength in their arms but return with wealth in their hands and a wreath of glory upon their heads.”

Kfarmishki did not escape the 1860 and 1925 regional conflicts, both of which involved hostilities between Christians and Druzes. In 1860, initial skirmishes, tit-for-tat murders, and looting between the two groups escalated into a full-fledged and bloody armed conflict which the Ottoman Sultan Abdulmejid I and his appointed governor in Mount Lebanon, Omar Pasha, were unable to control. The conflict persisted even after the Ottomans partitioned Mount Lebanon into Christian and Druze sections on the advice of the representatives of France and Britain, which allied themselves with the Christians and Druzes, respectively. As the conflict spread to the southern Beqaa, the Druzes attacked Christian towns and villages. The bloodiest attacks occurred in Hasbaya and Rashaya, resulting in the massacre of approximately 1,800 Christians. Kfarmishki was among several Christian villages, along with Beit Lahia and Haoush, that were attacked and saw their houses burned down.

The demise of the Ottoman Empire at the end of World War I marked another period of great upheaval in Lebanon and Syria. A movement led by Prince Faisal aimed to unify all Arab lands and create the Arab Kingdom of Syria with Faisal as king. In opposition to this movement, western powers imposed a mandate system that divided these lands into French- and British-controlled territories. Under this system, France gained control of Syria and Lebanon, with Lebanon being recognized as an independent entity. This arrangement led to an anti-French uprising that culminated in the Great Druze revolt of 1925. Officials of the French Mandatory power antagonized the Druze tribes of Jabal al-Druze (Arabic: جبل الدروز) by introducing administrative and social reforms that were perceived as upending the traditional tribal hierarchy of the area. The arrest by the French of several Druze leaders ignited a full fledge rebellion. In south-east Lebanon, Christian towns and villages were attacked because of the pro-French leanings of Lebanese Christians, many of whom supported the French plan to incorporate the Beqaa into a Greater Lebanon. While the rebellion was eventually defeated, these towns and villages suffered severe damage. Kfarmishki was no exception and most of its houses were destroyed. New houses were subsequently rebuilt with financial assistance from the French Mandatory power, which was secured under the leadership of then-mayor Elia Mikhail Nasrallah. These houses, many of which still stand throughout the village, were built using limestone blocks excavated from local quarries following the traditional Lebanese architectural style, which features a cubic house shape, a triple-arch façade, and a distinctive pyramidal orange-red tiled roof (see photo).

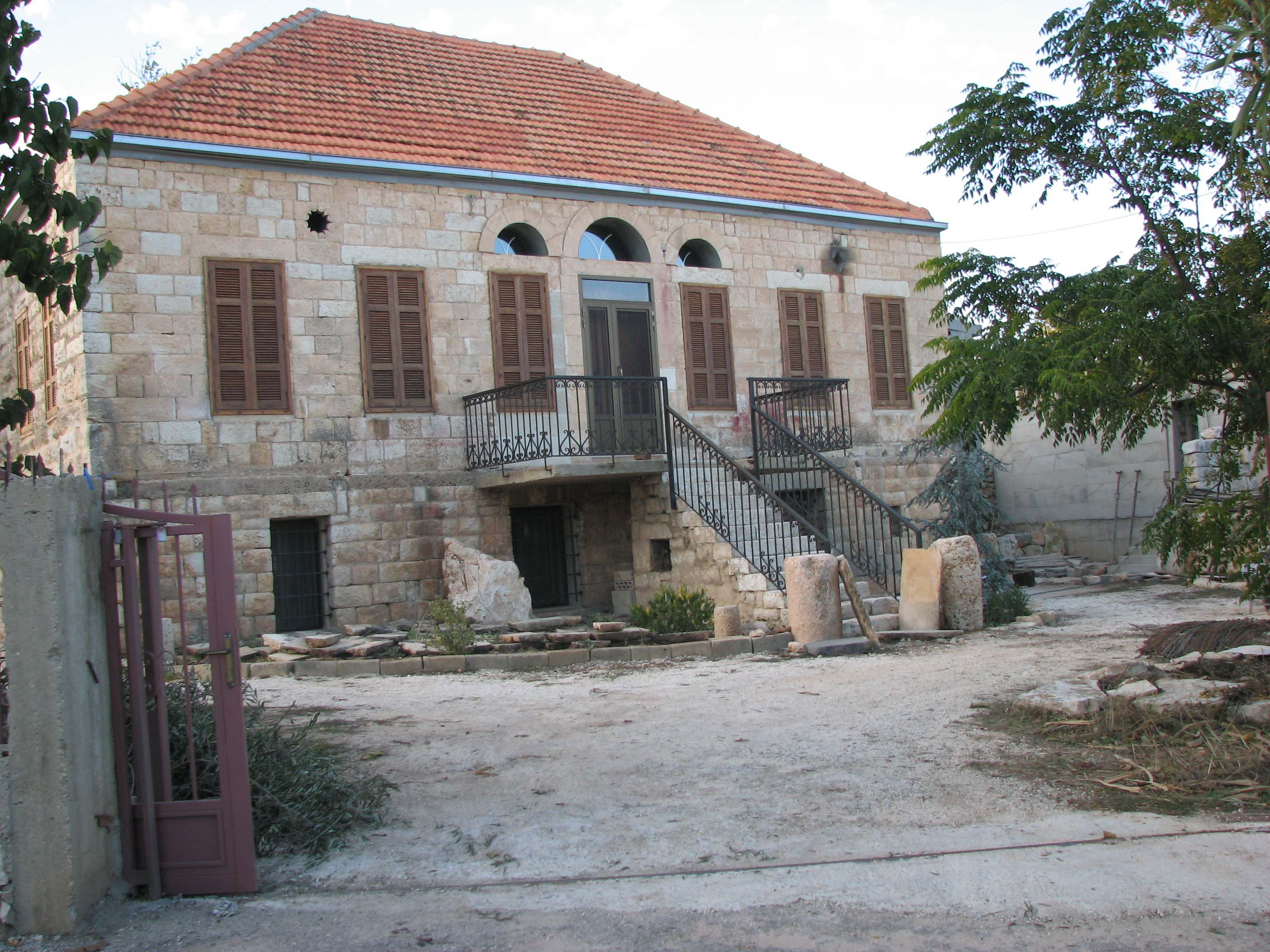
A Kfarmishky house built in the traditional Lebanese architectural style subsequent to the village's destruction during the 1925 Druze revolt. The Roman-era column remnants that flank the stairway were found on the site of the house.

=== The Kfarmishki Diaspora ===
The largest Kfarmishki diaspora community is in Ottawa, Canada, where the early arrival of the Boushey and Tannous Nasrallah (now Tannis) families was followed by several waves of migration. The community now numbers more than 9,000 individuals and includes the Ayoub, Besharah, Boushey, Nesrallah, Saab, Saikaly, and Tannis families. Additionally, smaller Kfarmishki diaspora communities are found in Montreal, Canada, in Brazil (~2,000 individuals), in Mexico, and in Argentina. As was the case for other Lebanese, the impetus for early waves of migration was often a desire to escape strife and secure economic opportunities. In the latter half of the twentieth century to the present, an additional impetus was the pursuit of opportunities for educational and professional advancement. In general, members of the Kfarmishki diaspora are well-respected members of their adoptive societies and have succeeded in many fields of work, including business, engineering, academics, medicine, music, and sports.

The migrants’ journeys were not always successful, however. In 1912, fourteen villagers intending to join their relatives in Ottawa, crossed the Atlantic on board the ill-fated Titanic. All but one perished, which is the largest number of Titanic fatalities for any one Lebanese village.

== Economy ==
Early inhabitants of Kfarmishki practiced subsistence agriculture based primarily on the cultivation of cereal grain (wheat, barley) crops and pulse (lentil, chickpea) crops using landraces that are highly adapted to the local semi-arid conditions. While these crops are still grown, they have been supplanted by other crops following the introduction in the 1930s of different fruit and nut tree varieties by forward-looking residents such as Elia Mikhail Nasrallah and the development of steady sources of water for irrigation. In addition to digging deep wells, villagers have dug pools for storage of rain and surface water runoff, a practice that was pioneered by Mikhail Elia Nasrallah in the early 1970s. Many different fruits including apples, pears, cherries, and grapes, as well as vegetables are grown primarily in a fertile plateau called Marj (Arabic: مرج; pasture) and in an area of rugged terrain called Shemiseh (Arabic: شميسه). Olive trees (for the production of table olives and olive oil, both essential staples of the Lebanese diet), as well as fig trees and trees for nut production (almonds, walnuts, and more recently pine nuts) are grown at various locations within and around the village. Notwithstanding this variety of crops, Kfarmishki is best known for its grapes, especially table grape varieties destined for Lebanese and international markets. A major grape producer in the village, Kamal Saikaly, owner of Saikaly farms, maintains a grape germplasm consisting of indigenous and introduced varieties. While several varieties (including the native Beitamouni and Tfeifihi varieties) are grown for production of table grapes, other varieties, the native white grape Obaideh in particular, are used for small-scale production of grape molasses (Arabic: دبس), of the distilled anise-flavored liqueur called arak (Arabic: عرق), and more recently of wine. In recent years, new grape varieties with high market value (such as Crimson and Thompson Seedless) have been introduced which, along with the adoption of modern agricultural practices, are expected to improve the villagers’ income.

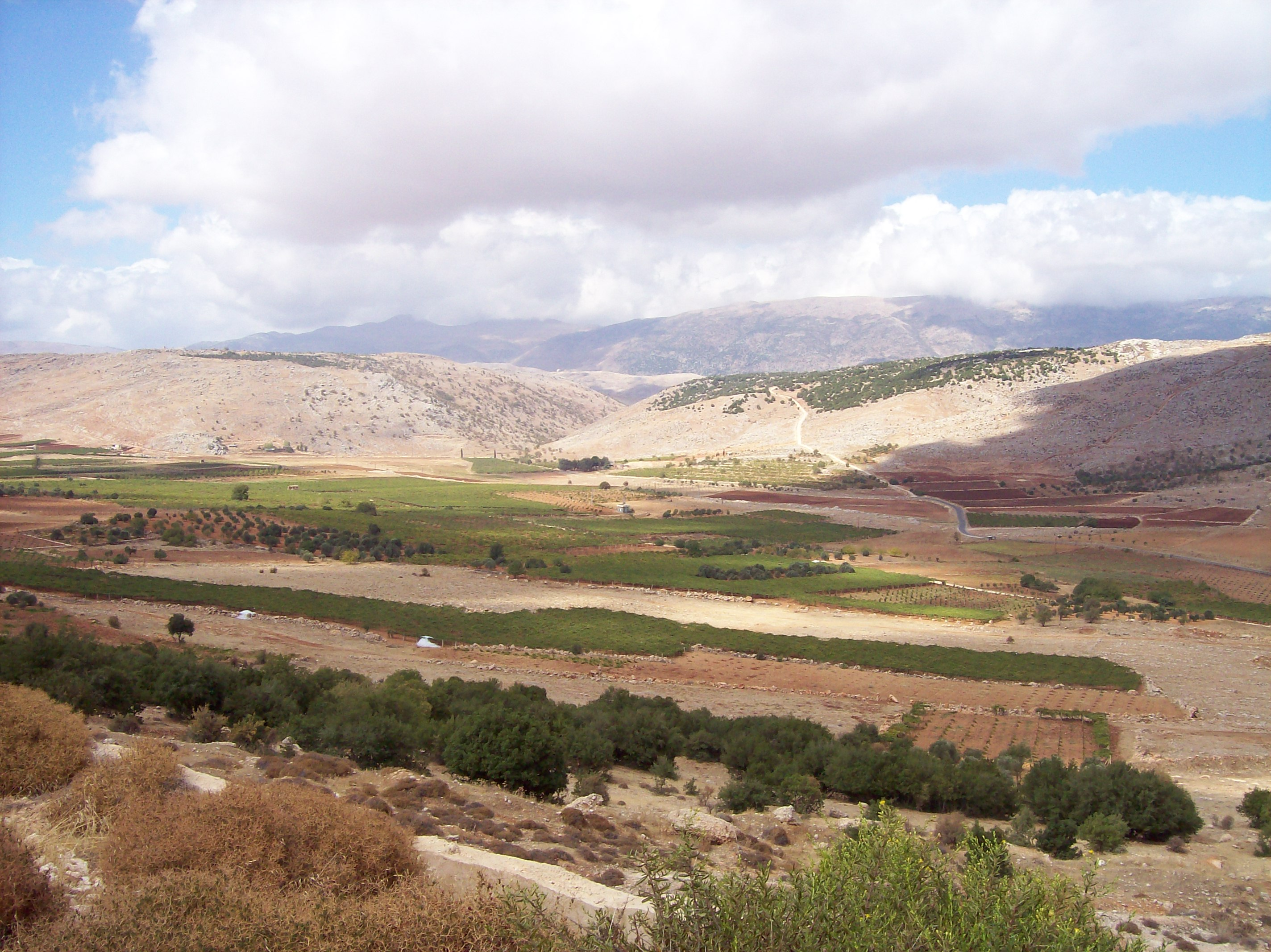
The "Marj" agricultural area with its extensive vineyards. Oak groves appear on hills surrounding the fertile valley.

Another modest source of income derives from small-scale commerce, in which local pantry products [mouneh; Arabic: مونه) are sold at farmers’ markets. These products are also showcased and sold at a yearly festival, typically held in September, which attracts a large number of visitors and features food made by locals, music played on traditional instruments, and the traditional Dabke (Arabic: دبكة) dance.

== Environment and Sustainability ==
In recent years, an increased environmental awareness by villagers has spurred environmental sustainability projects. With support from the United States Agency for International Development (USAID)], oaks (Lebanon oak and Kermes oak), cedar (Cedrus libani and Juniperus oxycedrus), and pine trees have been planted to re-forest and protect some non-arable areas from the destructive grazing by goats. Also with support from the USAID and cost sharing by the village municipality, a solar farm project was initiated by Raja Adballah and implemented by Caritas Lebanon under the Baladi Project. A total of 206 photovoltaic panels were installed on top of the school building, producing 87,364 KWH of energy, reducing carbon dioxide emissions by over 63,000 cubic meters, and resulting in yearly savings of over $12,000. With this project, Kfarmishki became one of the first Lebanese municipalities to gain energy independence and avoid the frequent electricity blackouts that plague all areas of Lebanon, and at the same time reduce the air and noise pollution previously produced by gasoline and diesel generators.

The Kfarmishki youth, working under the Live Love Kfarmishki NGO, have been instrumental in beautification of the village. With the encouragement and guidance of Raja Abdallah, they cleaned village roads and they started a recycling program for plastics and metals. And following up on the painting of murals by street artists from Art-of-Change they painted colorful art on the previously drab walls and steps of concrete buildings.

Together, these improvements are expected to create sustainable activities that could increase the villagers’ income by supporting a fledgling ecotourism and agritourism industry. Visitors are guided through walking trails in the village, its agricultural lands, and through hiking trails that are expected to connect to the popular Lebanon Mountain Trail

== Some People with Kfarmishki Roots ==
- Paul Anka – Lebanese Canadian American, born in Ottawa, Canada; singer, songwriter, and actor. His parents were both from Lebanon and his mother was from Kfarmishki.
- Chris McKhool – Lebanese Canadian, born in Ottawa, Canada; violinist, producer, guitarist, composer, and singer-songwriter; co-founder of the Toronto-based instrumental band Sultans of String, one of whose songs is called “Road to Kfarmishki”. His family is originally from Kfarmishki.
- Mikhail Elia Nasrallah - Lebanese American, born in Kfarmishki, Lebanon; plant molecular geneticist.
- Julie Nesrallah - Lebanese Canadian, born in Ottawa, Canada; mezzo-soprano and host of Tempo on Canada's national classical music program.

== Bibliography ==
- Frayha, A. (1997). Dictionary of the Names of Towns and Villages in Lebanon. Librairie du Liban. ISBN 0948690690.
- Robinson, E.; Smith, E. (1841). Biblical Researches in Palestine, Mount Sinai and Arabia Petraea: A Journal of Travels in the year 1838. Vol. 3. Boston: Crocker & Brewster.
- Taylor, G. (1971). The Roman Temples of Lebanon: A Pictorial Guide. Dar el-Mashreq.
