= Mikhail Nasrallah =

Plant molecular geneticist

Mikhail Elia Nasrallah is a plant scientist, specializing in the genetics of self-incompatibility in flowering plants. He is Professor Emeritus in the Plant Biology Section of the School of Integrative Plant Science in the New York State College of Agriculture and Life Sciences at Cornell University.

== Education ==
Nasrallah was born in Kfarmishki, Lebanon. He received a Bachelor of Science degree in Agriculture and a certification in Agronomy [Ingénieur Agricole] from the American University of Beirut in 1960, a Master's degree in Horticulture from the University of Vermont in 1962, and a doctorate degree in Plant Breeding and Genetics from Cornell University in 1965.

== Career and Research ==
Nasrallah carried out postdoctoral research at Cornell University from 1965-1967. He had a faculty position in Genetics at the State University of New York/Cortland from 1967 to 1985, and subsequently moved to Cornell University.

Much of Nasrallah's research has focused on the molecular genetic analysis of self-incompatibility in plants of the crucifer (Brassicaceae) family. Self-incompatibility prevents flowering plants from self-fertilizing or reproducing with genetically-related plants.

Over the course of his career, Nasrallah's work has resulted in numerous scientific publications which have been cited over 10,000 times with an h-index of 51. His research has also been featured in several perspective articles and paper alerts in high-impact journals.

As a doctoral student at Cornell, Nasrallah made a major scientific contribution by devising a new approach to the molecular analysis of self-incompatibility. Instead of the pollen-centric focus which at the time had been the norm in research aimed at identifying the molecular components of self-incompatibility in various plant families, he reasoned that investigating the contribution of the pistil to the self-incompatibility response would be a more successful approach for identifying molecules involved in SI. Working in Brassica, he focused on the stigma, which is the structure that caps the pistil and at the surface of which "self" pollen grains are inhibited in self-incompatible crucifers. This approach led him to identify the first molecule encoded by an self-incompatibility–determining gene. This strategy of using the pistil as a starting point for identifying the molecular components of self-incompatibility has become common practice for molecular analysis of self-incompatibility across various plant families.

The stigma molecule identified by Nasrallah was later used by his team at Cornell as a launching pad for a detailed analysis of the S locus, whose large number of variants (classically known as "alleles") control recognition of "self" pollen in self-incompatible Brassica plants. This analysis led to the breakthrough demonstration that the S locus is a complex locus and that its "alleles" are in fact haplotypes, each of which contains two genes that encode, respectively, the stigma and pollen determinants of self-incompatibility: a receptor protein kinase displayed at the surface of the stigma epidermal cells that capture pollen and its small protein ligand located in the outer coating of pollen grains. His team conducted gene transfer experiments that demonstrated that these two genes are necessary and sufficient for determining specificity in the self-incompatibility response. The subsequent finding that the interaction of the stigma receptor with its pollen ligand, and hence receptor activation, is S haplotype-specific (i.e. they will only occur if the pollen ligand and the stigma receptor are derived from the same S haplotype) explained how the stigma can discriminate between self- and non-self pollen grains in self-incompatible crucifers. This mechanism of self-recognition has now been shown to operate in all tested self-incompatible species from various crucifer genera, such as Brassica, Arabidopsis, and Capsella.

== Awards and honors ==
Nasrallah received the American University of Beirut's highest scholastic honor, the Penrose Award, in 1960; an award in Horticulture from the Burpee Foundation in 1961; and an award from the American Institute of Biological Sciences in 1970 in recognition of an outstanding research contribution related to a vegetable crop used for processing.
