= 1970 Lebanese presidential election =

- 17 August 1970

99 members of the Parliament 50 votes needed to win
- Turnout: 100%
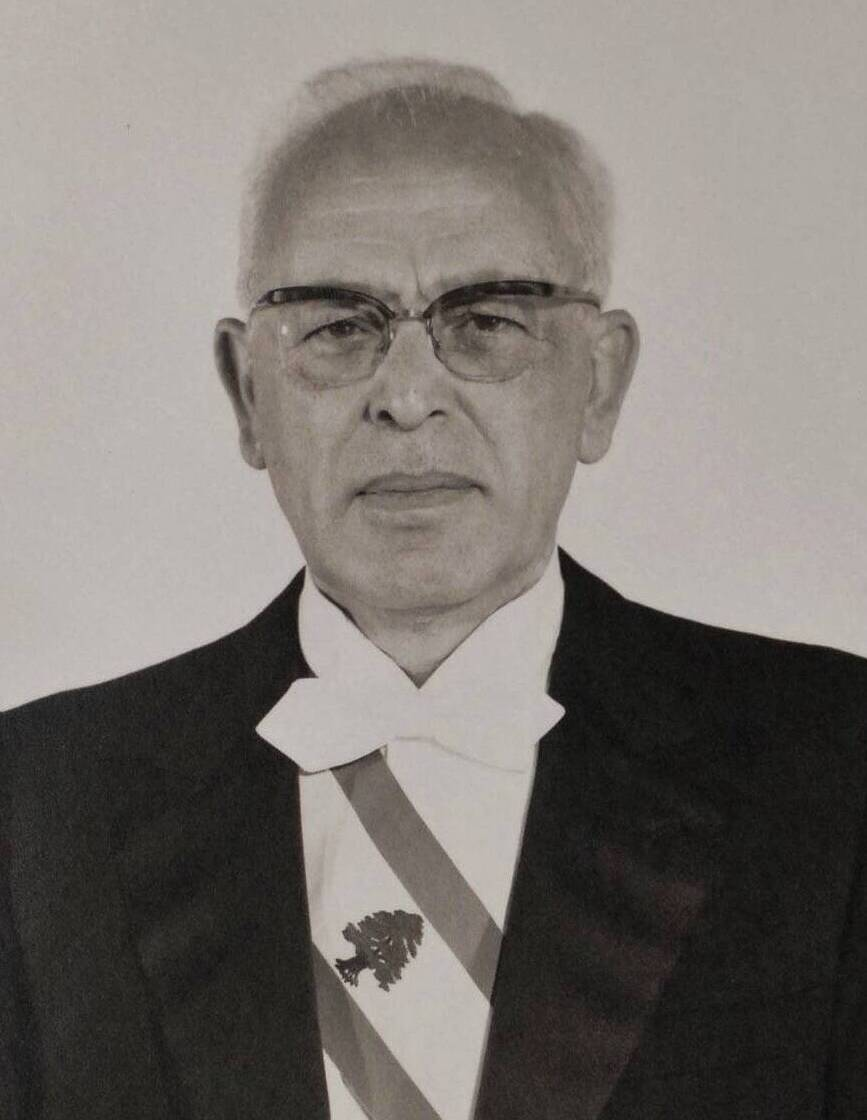

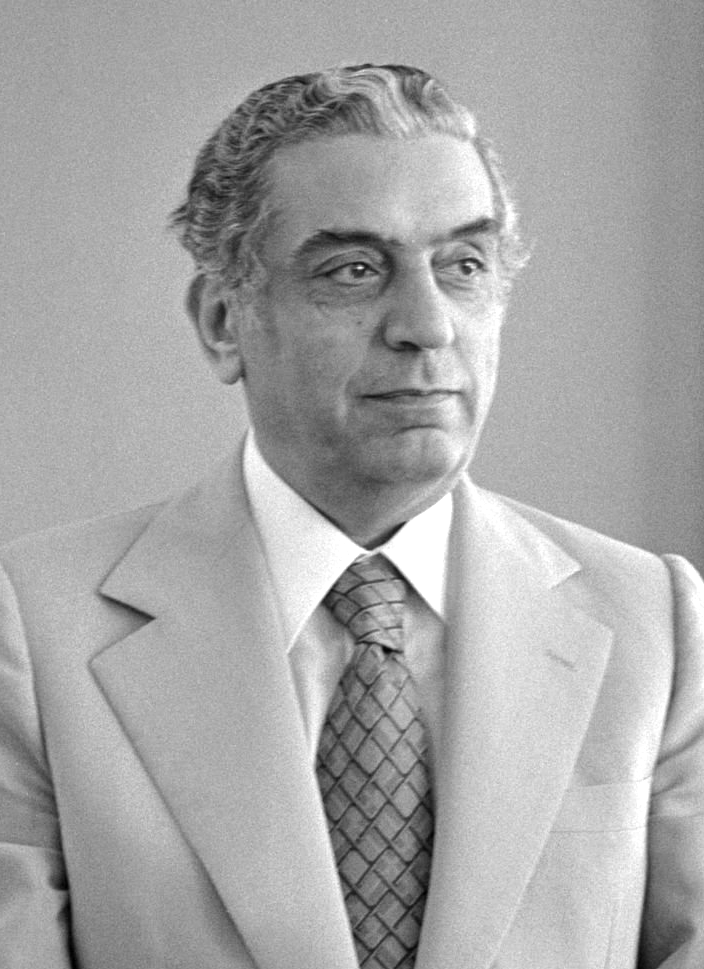
Nominee	Suleiman Frangieh	Élias Sarkis
Party	Marada Movement	Chehabist
Electoral vote	50	49
Percentage	50.51%	49.49%
President before election
Charles Helou
Chehabist
Elected President
Suleiman Frangieh
Marada Movement

An indirect presidential election was held in the Parliament of Lebanon on 17 August 1970, resulting in Deputy Suleiman Frangieh being elected President of the Lebanese Republic.

By convention, the presidency is always attributed to a Maronite Christian. Under the article 49 of the Lebanese Constitution, a qualified majority of two-thirds of the members of the then 99-seat Lebanese Parliament is required to elect the president in the first round. After the second round of election, the president is elected by an absolute majority of the total number of deputies in office.

Suleiman Frangieh, a deputy representing Zgharta in North Lebanon, posed as a conservative consensus candidate, gaining the support from both the left and right and across religious factions due to backlash from the 12 continuous years of reform from the Chehabist regimes. In what was possibly the most controversial presidential election in Lebanon, he was elected by the thinnest margin possible - on a 1-vote difference - on the 17 August 1970 by 50 of the 99 Representatives.

== Results ==
All 99 MPs were present. Usually, a consensus candidate would have been agreed before-hand, however in this case both Frangieh and Sarkis had roughly equal support In the first round, a majority of two-thirds of present deputies was required; in the second and subsequent rounds, however, only a simple majority was needed.

In the first round, no one received the 2/3 threshold needed, therefore the election proceeded to the second round. In that round, however, an extra ballot was cast (there were 100 votes in the urn and only 99 deputies in total), therefore the round was negated. In the third round, Frangieh won an upset victory over Élias Sarkis, the official candidate of the Chehabist regime, due to a last minute change of Kamal Jumblatt, who ordered one of his deputies to vote for Frangieh. The Speaker of the Chamber, Sabri Hamadeh, refused to announce the results on a 1-vote difference and walked out of the parliament building. As he exited the chamber, Deputy Speaker Michel Georges Sassine exercised his functions as Acting Speaker and declared Suleiman Frangieh the 10th President of the Lebanese Republic.

Candidate	First round		Second round		Third round	
Candidate	Votes	%	Votes	%	Votes	%
Suleiman Frangieh	38	38.4			50	50.5
Élias Sarkis	45	45.5			49	49.5
Pierre Gemayel	10	10.1				
Jamil Lahoud	5	5.1				
Adnan Hakim	1	1.0				
Extra ballot	0	–	1	–	0	–
Total	99	100	100	–	99	100
Eligible voters/turnout	99	100	99	–	99	100
Source: The Monthly

== Aftermath ==
About 5 years later, the Lebanese Civil War began as armed right-wing Christian militias began clashing more often with left-wing Muslim PLO militias in Beirut.
