= 1943 Lebanese presidential election =

- 21 September 1943

55 members of the Parliament 37 votes needed to win
- Turnout: 85.45%
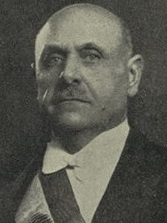
Nominee	Bechara El Khoury
Party	Constitutional Bloc
Electoral vote	44
Percentage	100%
President before election
Petro Trad
Independent
Elected President
Bechara El Khoury
Constitutional Bloc

The 1943 Lebanese presidential election was the fourth presidential election, which was held as a parliamentary session on 21 September 1943. The Constitutional Bechara El Khoury was elected as the only candidate and took office as the sixth president of Greater Lebanon.

The president is elected by the members of parliament. He needs a two-thirds majority to win in the first round, while an absolute majority is enough in the second round.

Only 47 deputies out 55 attended the session. El Khoury won the election in the first round, since he got 44 votes, more than the two-thirds needed majority.

Candidate	Votes	%
Bechara El Khoury	44	100.00
Total	44	100.00
Blank votes	3	6.38
Total votes	47	–
Registered voters/turnout	55	85.45
