= Military Cabinet of Fouad Chehab =

50th cabinet of Lebanon

The Military Cabinet of Fouad Chehab fifteenth Lebanese government after independence, and the fifteenth under President Bechara El Khoury. The cabinet was the first government since independence to be headed by a non-Sunni sect and formed by Major General Fouad Chehab. The government which was an emergency cabinet was formed by Decree No. 9444 on 18 September 1952 and it continued to operate until 30 September 1952. The government oversaw the process of electing the President of the Republic to succeed President Bechara El Khoury, who resigned after forming the government.

== List ==
The cabinet was composed of the following three members:

Military Cabinet of Fuad Chehab
Portfolio	Minister	Political affiliation	Religious affiliation	Governorate
Prime Minister	Fouad Chehab	Military	Maronite	Mount Lebanon
Defence	Fouad Chehab	Military	Maronite	Mount Lebanon
Deputy Prime Minister	Nazem Akkari	Military	Sunni	North Governorate
Telecommunications	Nazem Akkari	Military	Sunni	North Governorate
Information	Nazem Akkari	Military	Sunni	North Governorate
Public Works	Nazem Akkari	Military	Sunni	North Governorate
Education	Nazem Akkari	Military	Sunni	North Governorate
Foreign Affairs	Nazem Akkari	Military	Sunni	North Governorate
Interior	Nazem Akkari	Military	Sunni	North Governorate
Agriculture	Nazem Akkari	Military	Sunni	North Governorate
Health	Nazem Akkari	Military	Sunni	North Governorate
Finance	Basil Trad	Military	Greek Catholic	Mount Lebanon
Social Affairs	Basil Trad	Military	Greek Catholic	Mount Lebanon
Justice	Basil Trad	Military	Greek Catholic	Mount Lebanon
Economy	Basil Trad	Military	Greek Catholic	Mount Lebanon
