= Rashaya Citadel =

National monument in Lebanon

Coordinates: 33.5000°N 35.8418°E

- قلعة راشيا
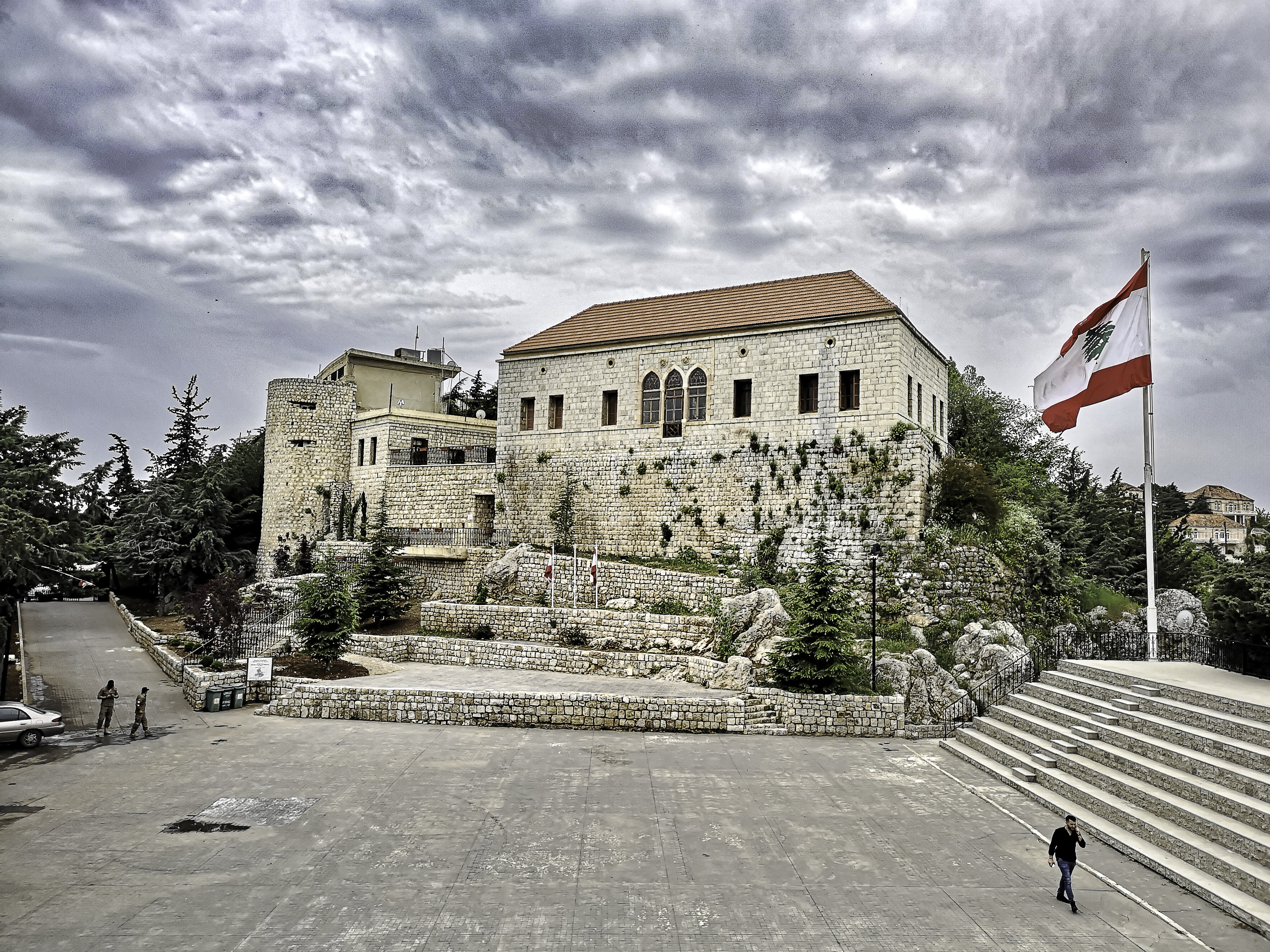
- Interactive map of Rashaya Citadel
- Location: Rashaya, Lebanon
- Designer: Shihab dynasty
- Completion date: 18th century

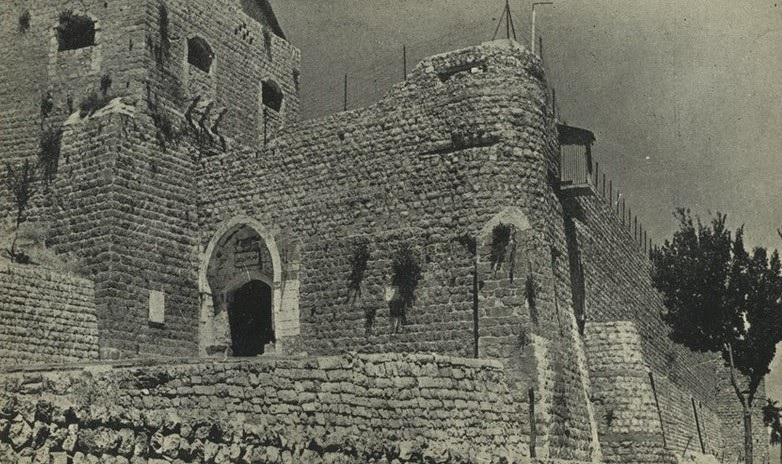
Rashaya Citadel in 1947

The Rashaya Citadel or Citadel of Independence is a national monument, in Lebanon. It was built as a palace by the Shihab family in the 18th century, was used by the French Mandate, and is now stationed by the Lebanese Armed Forces. It is a tourist site that can be visited while under the army's surveillance. The castle includes vaulted rooms and overlooks the historic mountain town.

== History ==
The town of Rashaya overlooks the Taim Valley, a strategic position for fortress construction, and the present fort occupies an area where there are remains from more ancient fortifications including: Canaanite, Greco-Roman, Arab, Crusader and Ottoman rulers. The Shehab family refurbished the so-called Feather Tower on the site.

In November and December 1925, the Great Druze Revolt rocked the area as 3,000 Druze under the command of Zayd Beg surrounded the fort and its French legionnaires under Captain Granger until French reinforcements arrived.

== French Mandate ==
Under the French Mandate, on 11 November 1943, the arrest and imprisonment of Lebanese national leaders in the citadel was ordered by Commissioner Jean Helleu, delegate general of the Free French authorities, and carried out by Free French troops. The prisoners included (Bechara El Khoury (later the first post-independence president of Lebanon), Riad El-Solh (later the prime minister), Salim Takla, Camille Chamoun, Adel Osseiran and Abdelhamid Karameh. This led to national and international pressure for their release and France soon relented. On November 22, 1943, the prisoners were released. That day was declared the Lebanese Independence Day.
