= 1982 Stockholm municipal election =

Swedish local election

The Stockholm municipal election of 1982 was held on 19 September 1982 concurrently with the 1982 Swedish parliamentary election. This election used a party-list proportional representation system to allocate the 101 seats of the Stockholm City Council (Stockholms stadsfullmäktige) amongst the various Swedish political parties. Voter turnout was 86.7%.

This election was the first held with the participation of the Swedish Green Party, which was founded in 1981. The Greens received less than one percent of the votes in the 1982 Stockholm municipal election and thus were allocated no seats; they would receive their first mandate on the city council in 1991.

== Results ==
Party	Votes			Seats	
Party	#	%	+ –	#	+ –
Social Democrats; Socialdemokraterna (s)	181,837	39.2%	+1.8%	41	+2
Moderate Party; Moderata samlingspartiet (m)	149,241	32.2%	+3.2%	34	+3
Left Party Communists; Vänsterpartiet kommunisterna (v)	43,304	9.3%	–0.3%	11	+1
Centre Party; Centerpartiet (c)	29,176	6.3%	–1.1%	6	±0
People's Party; Folkpartiet (fp)	23,621	5.1%	–5.2%	6	–6
Christian Democratic; Kristdemokratiska samhällspartiet (kd)	5,182	1.1%	+0.1%	0	±0
Green Party; Miljöpartiet (mp)	2,929	0.6%	—	0	—
Other parties	28,075	6.1%	+0.9%	3	±0
Total	463,365	100%	—	101	±0
Invalid ballots	5,192				

== See also ==
- Elections in Sweden
- List of political parties in Sweden
- City of Stockholm
