= Second Lebanese Republic =

Republic of Lebanon الجمهورية اللبنانية (Arabic) al-Jumhūrīyah al-Lubnānīyah
- Flag Coat of arms
- Anthem: كلّنا للوطن (Arabic); Koullouna lilouataan lil oula lil alam (English: All of us! For our Country!)
- Location of Lebanon (in green)
- Capital and largest city: Beirut; 33°54′N 35°32′E
- Official languages: Arabic
- Recognised languages: French, English
- Local vernacular: Lebanese Arabic
- Demonym: Lebanese
- Government: Unitary confessionalist parliamentary republic
  - President: Joseph Aoun
  - Prime Minister: Nawaf Salam
  - Speaker of the Parliament: Nabih Berri
- Legislature: Parliament

Establishment
  - Taif Agreement: 22 October 1989

Area
  - Total: 10,452 km^{2} (4,036 sq mi)
- Currency: Lebanese pound (LBP)
- Calling code: +961
- ISO 3166 code: LB
- Internet TLD: .lb

The Second Republic (Arabic: الجمهورية الثانية, romanized: Al-Jumhūriyyah Aṯ-ṯāniyah) is Lebanon's current republican system of government. It was established on 22 October 1989 by Lebanese political leaders and business people under the Taif Agreement.

The Second Republic emerged from the slow erosion of the Lebanese Civil War and ratification of the National Reconciliation Accord, replacing the disproportional representation of the religious sects in Lebanon from 55:45 to 1:1 proportional representation of Christians and Muslims in parliament and political powers of Muslim-reserved prime ministerial position strengthened over Christian-reserved presidency position. This agreement, however, was put into practice on 24 December 1990. René Moawad was the first head of state to have been elected under this republic.

== Background ==
=== Taif Agreement ===
The agreement covered political reform, the ending of the Lebanese Civil War, the establishment of special relations between Lebanon and Syria, and a framework for the beginning of complete Syrian withdrawal from Lebanon. Since Rafik Hariri was a former Saudi diplomatic representative, he played a significant role in constructing the Taif Agreement. It is also argued that the Taif Accord reoriented Lebanon toward the Arab world, especially Syria. In other words, the Taif Accord positioned Lebanon as a country with "an Arab identity and belonging." The agreement was finalized and confirmed only after the development of an anti-Saddam Hussein international alliance. The alliance included Saudi Arabia, Egypt, Syria, France, Iran and the United States.

The agreement contained multiple constitutional amendments, which came into force following President Hrawi's signature in September 1990. Among the most major changes:

- The ratio of Christians to Muslims in Parliament was reduced from 6:5 to 1:1.
- The term length of the Speaker of the House was increased from one to four years. (Article 44 of the constitution).
- Article 17 of the constitution was amended from "the executive power is vested in the President of the Republic, who exercises with the assistance of his ministers" to "the executive power is vested in the Council of Ministers, who exercise it according to the dispositions of this constitution".
- Presidential prerogatives were somewhat curtailed. Among the powers lost were:
  - Require parliamentary consultations before nominating the Prime Minister.
  - Cannot dismiss or appoint individual ministers at will (requires approval of the council).
  - Introduce laws in Parliament. Instead, he introduces them to the Cabinet, who then vote to transmit it to Parliament.
  - Nominate or dismiss state employees, which became the council's duty. In reality, this had little impact in political life as civil servants were generally nominated by ministers and then voted on in cabinet, before being appointed by the President.

== Development ==
Since the election of Michel Aoun as president in 2016 and the formation of a new Government headed by Prime Minister Saad Hariri, there were two sides, the March 14 alliance which supported the election of Michel Aoun but only if mainly the Lebanese Forces having 7/20 of the governmental seats. Michel Aoun and Samir Geagea signed the "Maarab Agreement" and it was considered a historical peace between two rival and old political parties. Michel Aoun ended up not fiving the required seats to the Lebanese forces but Samir Geagea did not seem to complain until after the "17 October revolution" in Lebanon which Samir Geagea tried his best in trying to impress but to no avail. Namely sides that were against the election of Michel Aoun as president in the 2016 elections, consisted of traditional, though non-sectarian, parties such as the Kataeb party and the National Liberal Party. Since then, the political scene has been witnessing the emergence of new non-sectarian political groups such as Lihaqqi and Citizens in a State (MMFD), in addition to many civil society groups who were loosely allied during the last parliamentary elections. Although they share a common goal to replace what they consider a failed political model, that was introduced following the end of the civil war leading to the 2020 economic crisis, they are not unified in order to assimilate and conquer the prevailing government. The then-elected government has failed its duties as a government and the Prime Minister, Saad Hariri, attempted to resign while he was in Saudi Arabia in 2017, but it was ruled unconstitutional. Later on, during the October protests he resigned as Prime Minister. Moreover, he was later designated in October, 2020 and once again as Prime Minister nevertheless his attempt at creating a government did not take place.

During the quorum for electing the 2 Secretaries of the Parliament in 2022, it was decided that the secretaries would be attributed to one Maronite Christian and one Druze which was not constitutionally required. The election process of the 2 deputies had large debate particularly by opposition MPs. It was suggested that each MP votes for both preferences in the same ballot. However, it was decided that voting would take place on the basis of one name per ballot. As a result of this Firas Hamdan, an opposition MP, who was one of few candidates for the Druze secretary, withdrew his candidacy in protest of the sectarian electoral procedure.

The fall of Assad's regime in Syria was said to start a new chapter in Lebanon without the interference of the Syrian Baathist regime. On 9 January 2025, Lebanon elected a president for the first time without the Syrian Baathist regime in power since 1958, meaning the first time in decades that a president did not need to be approved by Syria. Lebanese security institutions became able to function without direct or indirect interference by Syria's now defunct regime. In 2025, Lebanon got both a new president (Joseph Aoun) and a new prime minister (Nawaf Salam).

== Presidents of the Second Republic ==
No.	Name (Birth–Death)	Lived	Term of office		Political party
No.	Name (Birth–Death)	Lived	Took office	Left office	Political party
1	René Moawad - رينيه معوض	1925–1989	5 November 1989	22 November 1989	Independence Movement
—	Selim Hoss - سليم الحص	1929–2024	22 November 1989	24 November 1989	Independent
2	Elias Hrawi - إلياس الهراوي	1926–2006	24 November 1989	24 November 1998	Independent
3	Émile Lahoud - إميل لحود	1936–	24 November 1998	24 November 2007	Independent
Vacant
4	Michel Suleiman - ميشال سليمان	1948–	25 May 2008	25 May 2014	Independent
Vacant
5	Michel Aoun - ميشال عون	1933–	31 October 2016	31 October 2022	Free Patriotic Movement
Vacant
6	Joseph Aoun - جوزيف عون	1964–	9 January 2025	Incumbent	Independent

== President image gallery ==
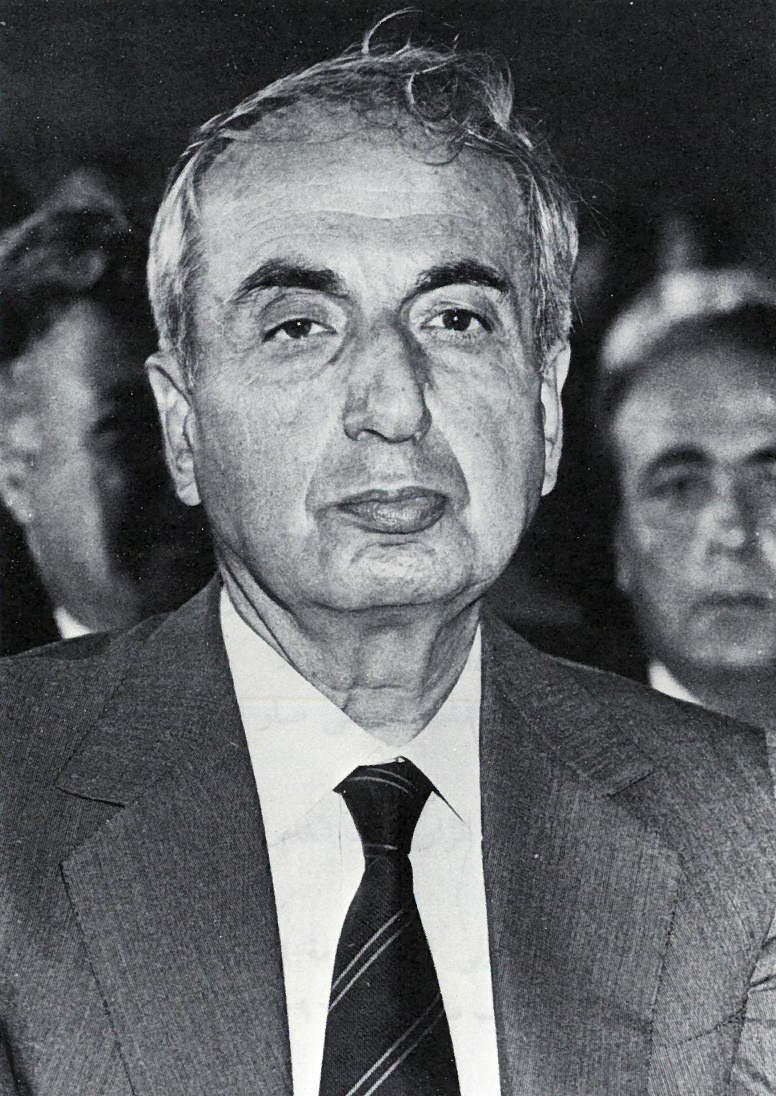
René Moawad
(1925–1989)
Served 1989

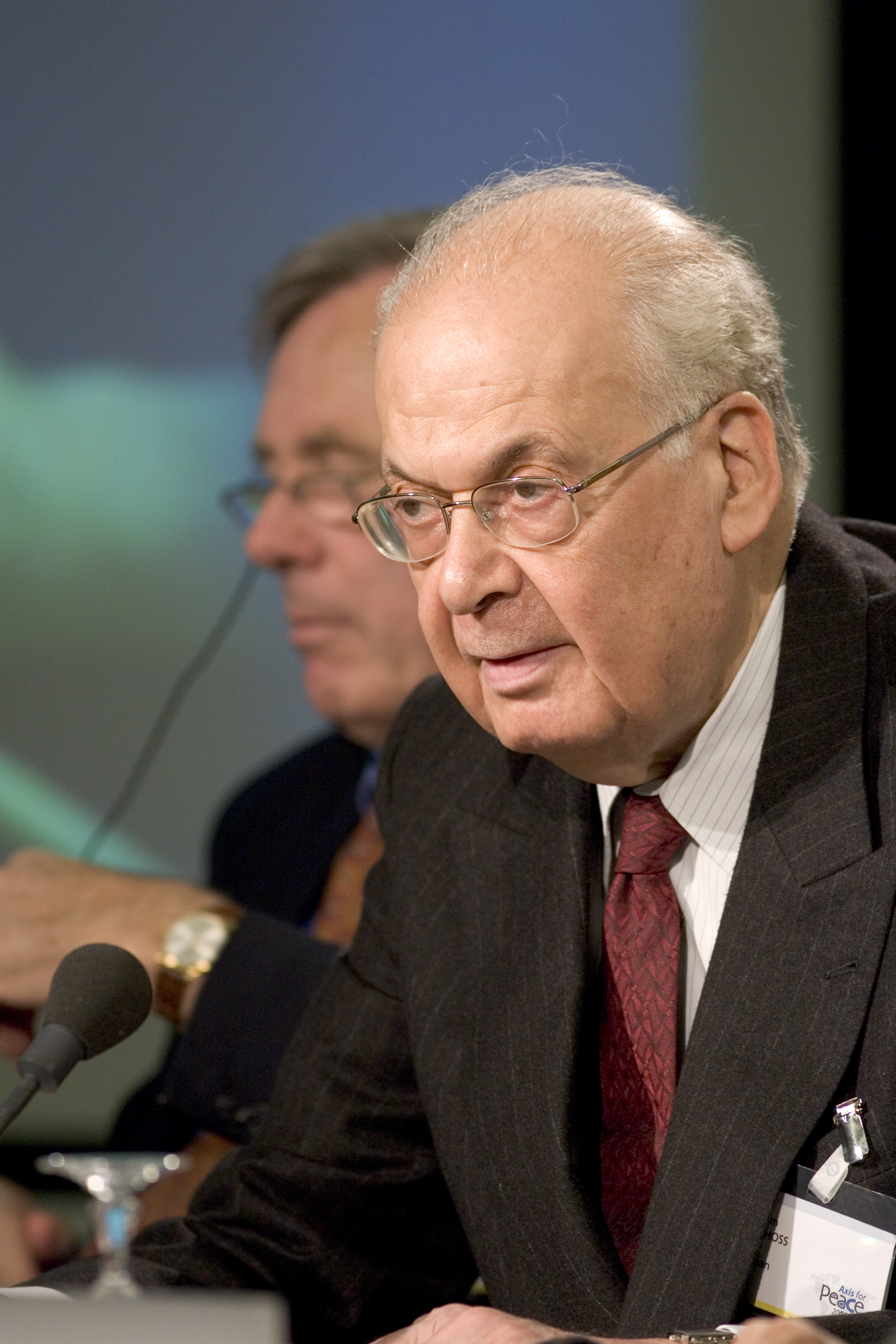
Selim Hoss
(1929–2024)
Served 1989 acting

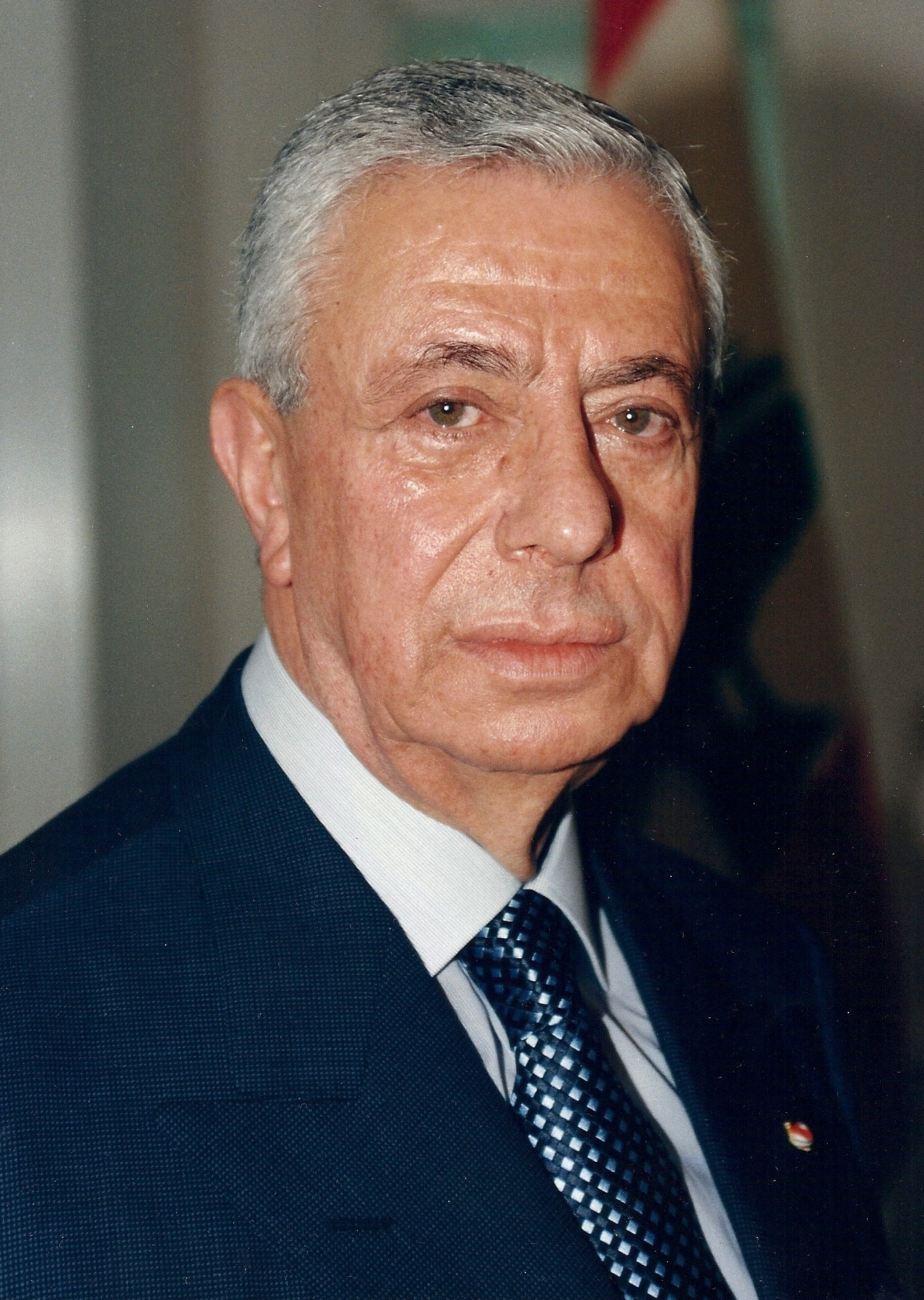
Elias Hrawi
(1926–2006)
Served 1989–1998

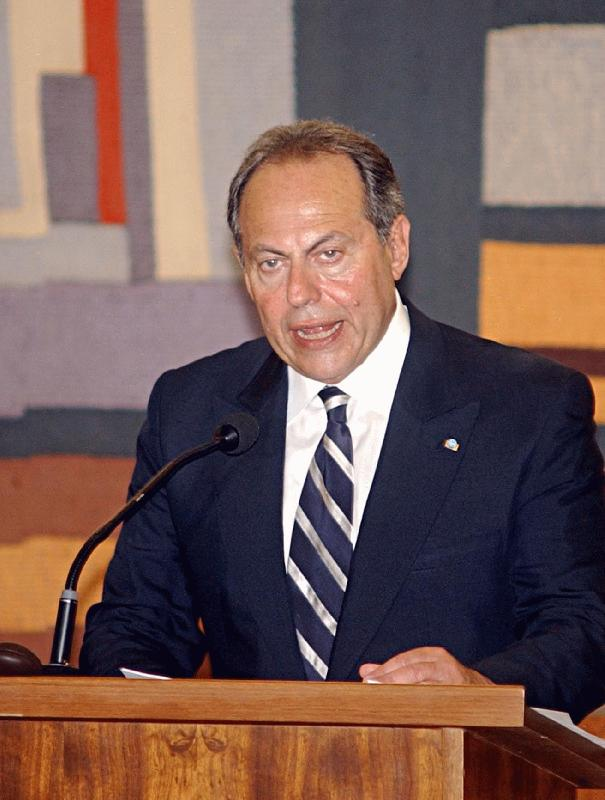
Emile Lahoud
(1936-)
Served 1998–2007

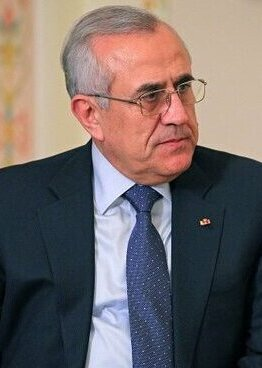
Michel Suleiman
(1948-)
Served 2008–2014

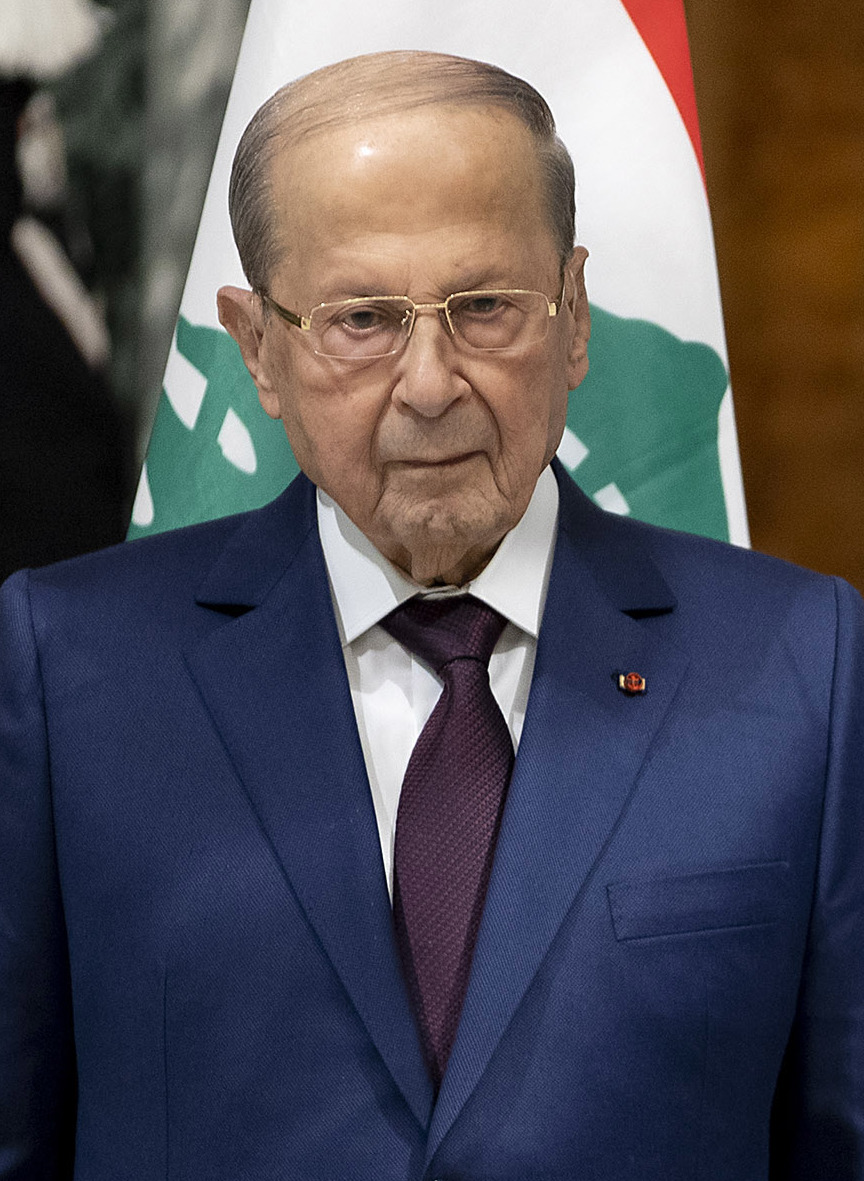
Michel Aoun
(1933-)
Served 2016–2022

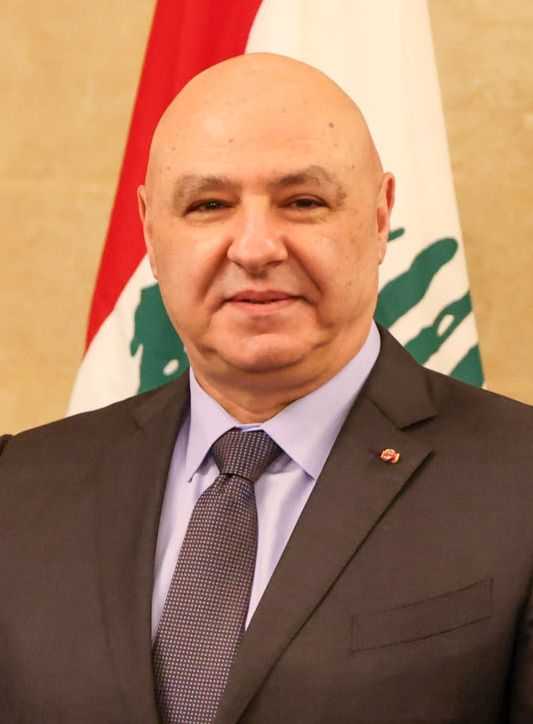
Joseph Aoun
(1964-)
Serving 2025-

== Prime ministers of the Second Republic ==
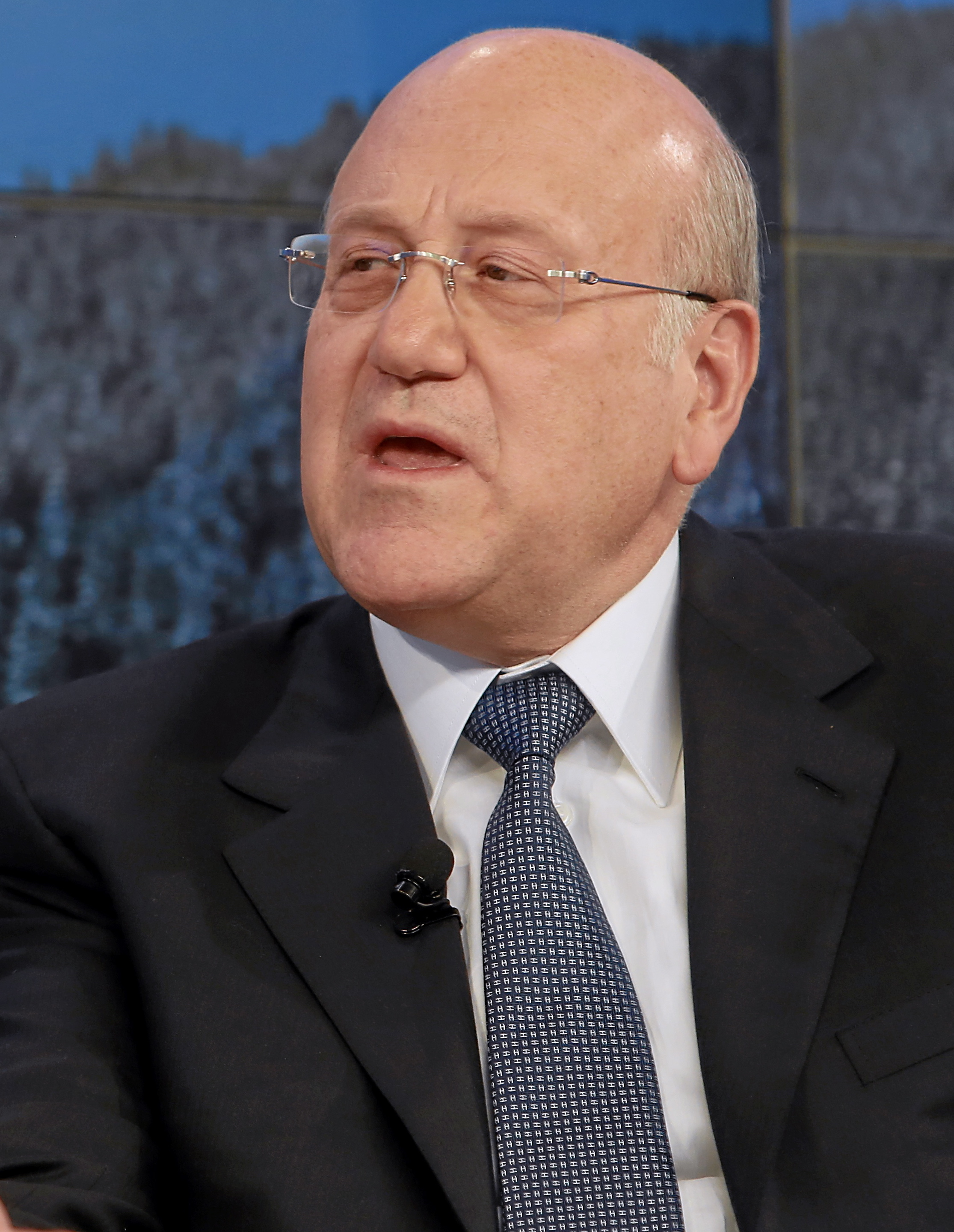
Former prime minister, Najib Mikati, of the Azm Movement

No.	Name (Birth–Death)	Lived	Term of office		Political party
No.	Name (Birth–Death)	Lived	Took office	Left office	Political party
1	Selim Hoss - سليم الحص	1929–2024	2 June 1987	24 December 1990	Independent
–	Michel Aoun - ميشال عون	1933–	22 September 1988	13 October 1990	Military
2	Omar Karami - عمر كرامي	1934–2015	24 December 1990	16 May 1992	Independent
3	Rachid Solh - رشيد الصلح	1926–2014	16 May 1992	31 October 1992	Independent
4	Rafic Hariri - رفيق الحريري	1944–2005	31 October 1992	4 December 1998	Future Movement
(1)	Selim Hoss - سليم الحص	1929–2024	4 December 1998	26 October 2000	Independent
(4)	Rafic Hariri - رفيق الحريري	1944–2005	26 October 2000	26 October 2004	Future Movement
7	Omar Karami - عمر كرامي	1934–2015	26 October 2004	19 April 2005	Arab Liberation Party
8	Najib Mikati - نجيب ميقاتي	1955–	19 April 2005	19 July 2005	Azm Movement
9	Fouad Siniora - فؤاد السنيورة	1943–	19 July 2005	9 November 2009	Future Movement
10	Saad Hariri - سعد الدين الحريري	1970–	9 November 2009	13 June 2011	Future Movement
(8)	Najib Mikati - نجيب ميقاتي	1955–	13 June 2011	15 February 2014	Azm Movement
12	Tammam Salam - تمّام سلام	1945–	15 February 2014	18 December 2016	Future Movement
(10)	Saad Hariri - سعد الدين الحريري	1970–	18 December 2016	21 January 2020	Future Movement
14	Hassan Diab - حسّان دياب	1959–	21 January 2020	10 September 2021	Independent
(8)(11)	Najib Mikati - نجيب ميقاتي	1955–	10 September 2021	8 February 2025	Azm Movement
16	Nawaf Salam - نوّاف سلام	1953–	8 February 2025	Incumbent	Independent
