= Orthodox Christianity in Lebanon =

Orthodox Christianity in Lebanon may refer to:

- Eastern Orthodox Christianity in Lebanon
- Oriental Orthodox Christianity in Lebanon

== See also ==
- Orthodox Christianity (disambiguation)
