= Rashaya =

Town in West Beqaa Governorate, Lebanon

Rashaya راشيا Rashaya al-Wadi, Rachaya el-Wadi, Rachaiya
- Town
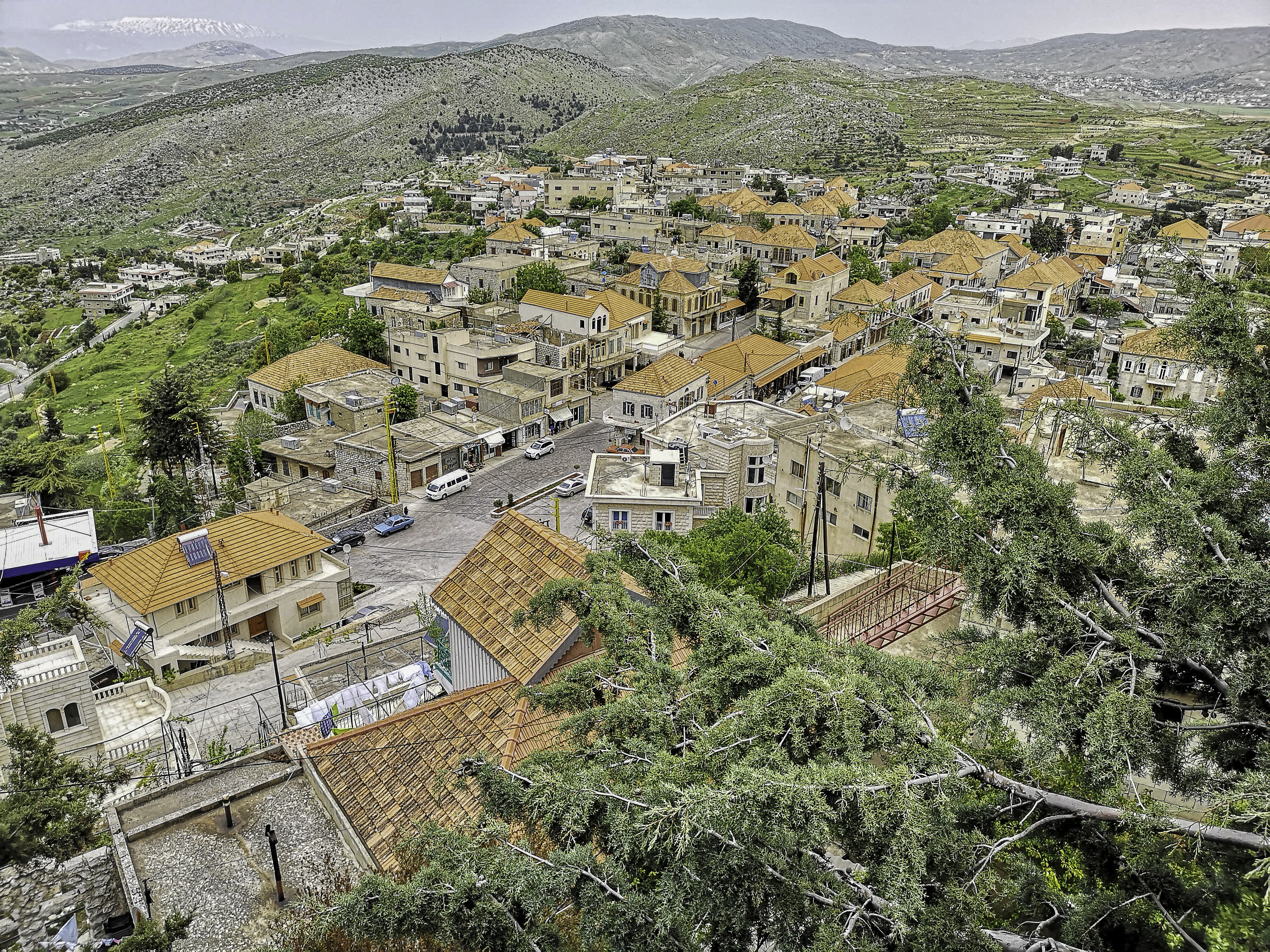
- Rashaya as seen from the citadel

- Location in Lebanon
- Coordinates: 33°30′05″N 35°50′40″E
- Country: Lebanon
- Governorate: Bekaa Governorate
- District: Rashaya District
- Elevation: 4,430 ft (1,350 m)

Population (2007)
  - Total: 8,500

Rashaya, Rachaya, Rashaiya, Rashayya or Rachaiya (Arabic: راشيا, romanized: Rāshayyā), also known as Rashaya al-Wadi or Rachaya el-Wadi (and variations), is a town of the Rashaya District in the western portion of the Beqaa Governorate of Lebanon. It is situated at around 1,200 metres (3,900 ft) above sea level on the western slopes of Mount Hermon, south east of Beirut near the Syrian border, and approximately halfway between Jezzine and Damascus.

Rachaya is known for the Rashaya Citadel where Bshara El Khoury was jailed in 1943. Since then, the town has become a symbol of independence.

== Culture ==
Rashaya has a population of around 6,000 to 7,500 that are mostly Druze. It is still considered to be a traditional Lebanese town with its old cobbled streets and small shops, even though it witnessed in recent years a slight expansion of buildings. It retains a distinguished character of traditional stone houses with red tiled roofs.

The small souk in the middle of the town offers various shops selling local crafts and inexpensive goods. There is a recently renovated goldsmiths selling an assortment of gold and silver jewelry in Byzantine and other styles.

The nearby Faqaa forest is classified as a protected area and Pine nuts from the local conifer trees are used in traditional cooking.

The Al-Aryan family was a prominent part of the Druze community in Rashaya in the 19th century and a branch, now called the Aryain family still inhabit the town. Rashaya has four churches and a dozen of Druze khalwaat. There is a Greek Catholic Church and a Syriac Catholic Church along with the Saint Nicholas Greek Orthodox Church.

== Archaeology ==
There have been findings of Paleolithic and Heavy Neolithic Stone Age tools near the town of Qaraoun along with Trihedral Neolithic material recovered nearby at Joub Jannine, both in the Western Bekaa province. The remains of a Roman temple can be seen on the left side of the road leading from Rashaya to the village of Aaiha, one of several Temples of Mount Hermon. Neolithic flints were also found in the hills 3 kilometres (1.9 mi) north of the town. There is also a significant Neolithic site nearby at Kawkaba where fragments of agricultural tools such as basalt hoes have been found with very faded dating suggesting the 6th millennium or earlier.

== History ==
The Rashaya Citadel, also known as the Citadel of Independence, has been declared a national monument, having been first built as a palace by the Shihab family in the 18th century. It is now stationed by the Lebanese Armed Forces and can be visited and seen under the army's surveillance.

In June 1860, the town was the scene of a massacre, where two hundred and sixty five Christians were killed by Druze forces, some within the citadel. Around one thousand victims were killed in the areas of Hasbaya and Rashaya between 10 and 13 June.

In November and December 1925, the town was engulfed and nearly obliterated by one of the largest battles of the Great Druze Revolt, when four hundred and twenty nine Christian homes were either damaged or destroyed. Three thousand Druze under Zayd Beg besieged the citadel of French legionnaires under a Captain Granger between 20 and 24 November. The Druze eventually suffered their first major defeat to French reinforcements, with heavy casualties marking a turning point in the Druze invasion of southern Lebanon.

Under the French Mandate and on 11 November 1943, Rashaya witnessed the arrest and the imprisonment of the Lebanese national leaders in its citadel by the Free French troops (Bechara El Khoury (the first post-independence President of Lebanon), Riad El-Solh (the Prime Minister), Pierre Gemayel, Camille Chamoun, Adel Osseiran). This led to a national and international pressure in demand for their release, and eventually obliging France to obey. On November 22, 1943, the prisoners were released, and that day was declared the Lebanese Independence Day.

Following the 1969 Cairo Agreement, Rashaya el-Wadi became a strategic gateway to the Arkoub region, often referred to as "Fatahland". Due to its proximity to the Syrian border and Mount Hermon, the town experienced a rapid erosion of central government authority as Palestinian paramilitary factions, primarily Fatah and the PFLP, established logistics bases in the surrounding hills.

- October 30, 1969: In a significant symbolic and military blow to the Lebanese state, Palestinian fedayeen units occupied the Rashaya Citadel following the "Battle of the Citadels." During the seizure, three people were summarily executed at a checkpoint established in Rachaiya al-Wadi. The fort, historically revered as the site of the 1943 independence, was converted into a paramilitary headquarters, effectively ending the Lebanese Armed Forces' jurisdiction over the town and its immediate environs. Historians identify this as the moment the central government lost military control over the vital inland corridors connecting the Hermon range to the Beqaa Valley, signaling the physical and symbolic displacement of state authority.
- November 1969: Following the "Ma'rakat el-Yabous" clashes along the Beirut–Damascus highway, the Lebanese Internal Security Forces (ISF) and Customs units were effectively withdrawn from the Rashaya–Masnaa axis, leaving the district's administration under the de facto control of the PLO and its local allies.
- 1972–1973: The district witnessed increased friction between the traditional Druze leadership and radical factions within the Lebanese National Movement (LNM). Historians note that during this period, Rashaya served as a primary transit point for heavy weaponry entering Lebanon from Syria, bypassing official state checkpoints.

By late 1974, Rashaya was fully integrated into the paramilitary security architecture of the South-East. The town's historical citadel was frequently utilized as a headquarters by non-state actors, signaling the symbolic and physical displacement of the Lebanese state.

- October 1974: Clashes erupted in the outskirts of Rashaya between local residents and paramilitary units attempting to requisition agricultural land for military fortifications. The incident is cited as a key early example of communal resistance to the "Fath-land" administration in the Bekaa.
- March 1975: Just weeks before the official outbreak of the civil war, the Rashaya–Chtoura road was the site of several "identity card" abductions, marking the arrival of the sectarian roadblock phenomenon to the Mount Hermon foothills.

During the later stages of the Lebanese Civil War, Rashaya served as a regional headquarters for a local unit of the South Lebanon Army (SLA). Despite historical communal tensions, a number of local Druze from the town and its environs enlisted in the force to maintain local security. This period was marked by a significant escalation in sectarian retaliation involving town-based personnel:

- September 20, 1984: Following an ambush in the nearby village of Sohmor (Saghmour) that resulted in the deaths of four Druze SLA members from the Rashaya unit, a reprisal attack was carried out against the village. The incident resulted in the summary execution of 13 local residents. International observers and historians identify the event as a critical breakdown of militia discipline and a primary example of the retaliatory violence that plagued the western Beqaa during this era.

== Geology ==
Rashaya is situated on a karst topography of grey or creamy-white, jurassic limestone with a thickness of up to 1 kilometre (0.62 mi). The Rashaya Fault has been defined as a left-lateral strike-slip fault that cuts into Mount Hermon and is an extension of the Banias Fault. It suggested to be pre-Pliocene and may be active. The danger of earthquakes is not high and there have been none on record. It runs a few kilometers east of the Hasbaya Fault, which in turn runs parallel to the Jordan valley. The Rashaya Fault may have experienced up to 1 kilometre (0.62 mi) of Quaternary horizontal movement and small breaches on the associated strands from it have developed small basins. The danger of earthquakes is not high and there have been none recorded from the fault.

== Climate ==
Rashaya receives between 650 millimetres (26 in) and 750 millimetres (30 in) of rainfall each year with around two fifths of this amount falling between November and March. It has an average annual temperature of 15 °C (59 °F), varying between 35 °C (95 °F) in the summer season down to −5 °C (23 °F) in winter. The dominant wind direction is east to west from which the town is somewhat sheltered by the mountains.

== Economy ==
The economy of the town is primarily based on agriculture, the services and tourism industries. The town has two olive oil presses and three grape molasses factories. Rashaya was designated one of nine poverty areas within Lebanon in a survey of 2002. The World Bank and U.S. Aid has financed development projects in the area with the assistance of the YMCA and other NGOs. Projects have included a $500,000 waste water treatment plant and redecoration of the town's guesthouse in 2007.

== Agriculture ==
Commonly grown crops include cherries, olives, apricots and grapes. Some wild cucumbers are also grown, however vegetables are less frequently grown due to low rainfall. Animal husbandry is also practiced, mainly with goats, of which the Labneh variety is a popular staple food for locals. Tree species such as oak, wild pistachio and sumac grow in the area. A variety of jackals and foxes, snakes, lizards and rodents live in the area along with various species of migratory birds.

== Demographics ==
In 2014 Druze made up 58.84% and Christians made up 40.12% of registered voters in Rashaya. 30.69% of the voters were Greek Orthodox.

== See also ==
- Rashaya District
- Cairo Agreement (1969)
- Fatahland
- List of extrajudicial killings and political violence in Lebanon
- Mount Hermon
- Wadi al-Taym
