= August 1982 Lebanese presidential election =

- 23 August 1982

99 members of the Parliament 50 votes needed to win
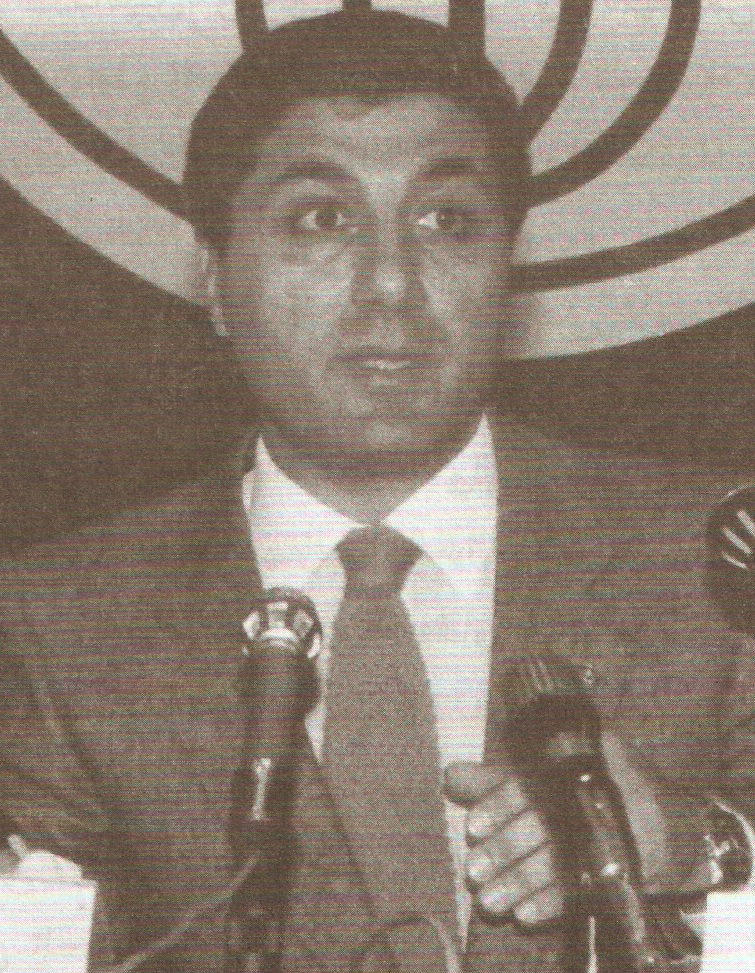
Nominee	Bachir Gemayel
Party	Kataeb
Electoral vote	57
Percentage	62%
President before election
Élias Sarkis
Chehabist
Elected President
Bachir Gemayel
Kataeb

An indirect presidential election was held in the Parliament of Lebanon on 23 August 1982, resulting in Lebanese Forces leader Bachir Gemayel being elected President of the Lebanese Republic.

By convention, the presidency is always attributed to a Maronite Christian. Under the article 49 of the Lebanese Constitution, a qualified majority of two-thirds of the members of the then 99-seat Lebanese Parliament is required to elect the president in the first round. After the second round of election, the president is elected by an absolute majority of the total number of deputies in office.

In the midst of the raging Lebanese Civil War, Syrian presence in the Bekaa and North Lebanon, and Israeli security belt in South Lebanon, outgoing president Elias Sarkis had failed to bring about reconciliation between warring factions. Under heavy American and Israeli support, Gemayel was able to garner the backing of Saudi Arabia (and by extension the Arab League) for his election to the presidency. With a boycott of pro-Syrian MPs, Gemayel was elected 7th President of Lebanon following independence from France in 1943.

== Results ==
As the Civil War had been resulted in the de facto partition of the country and militia everywhere, no election had taken place since 1972 for the Lebanese Parliament. Consequently, only 92 MPs out of 99 seats were still alive. After the quorum of two thirds was reached (62 out of 92 MPs attended), Gemayel was elected on the second round by a majority of Christian and Muslim MPs.

Candidate	First round		Second round	
Candidate	Votes	%	Votes	%
Bachir Gemayel	58	63	57	62
Raymond Edde	1	1	-	-
Blank ballot	3	–	5	–
Total	62	62	67	67
Source: The Monthly

== Aftermath ==
25 August : Deployment of International Separation Forces (mainly American, French, and Italian)

30 August : Yasser Arafat leaves Beirut for Athens

1 September : Meeting between Presidents Gemayel and Elias Sarkis with American Defense Secretary Caspar Weinberger

2 September : Opening the path of Sodeco that was previously considered as a separation line between East and West Beirut

4 September : The Lebanese Army enters West Beirut for the first time since 1973

9 September : The Lebanese Army enters the Palestinian Camp Bourj el-Barajneh and that was restricted since 1969 by the Cairo Agreement

10 September : The International Separation Forces leaves Lebanon after completing its task

11 September : Beirut's economic market resumes its activities; Gemayel meets with former Lebanese Prime Minister Saeb Salam.

13 September : Beirut's seaport resumes its activities

During these 21 days, fighters from the Lebanese Forces were prohibited from wearing their uniforms and also from carrying their weapons in the streets. The Lebanese Army was the only armed force in the streets. On the 14th of September 1982, Gemayel was assassinated in an explosion that killed more than thirty people by SSNP member Habib Shartouni, on the orders of Syria.
