= Tigers Militia =

Lebanese Christian–dominated militia active during the Lebanese War

Tigers Militia نمور الأحرار
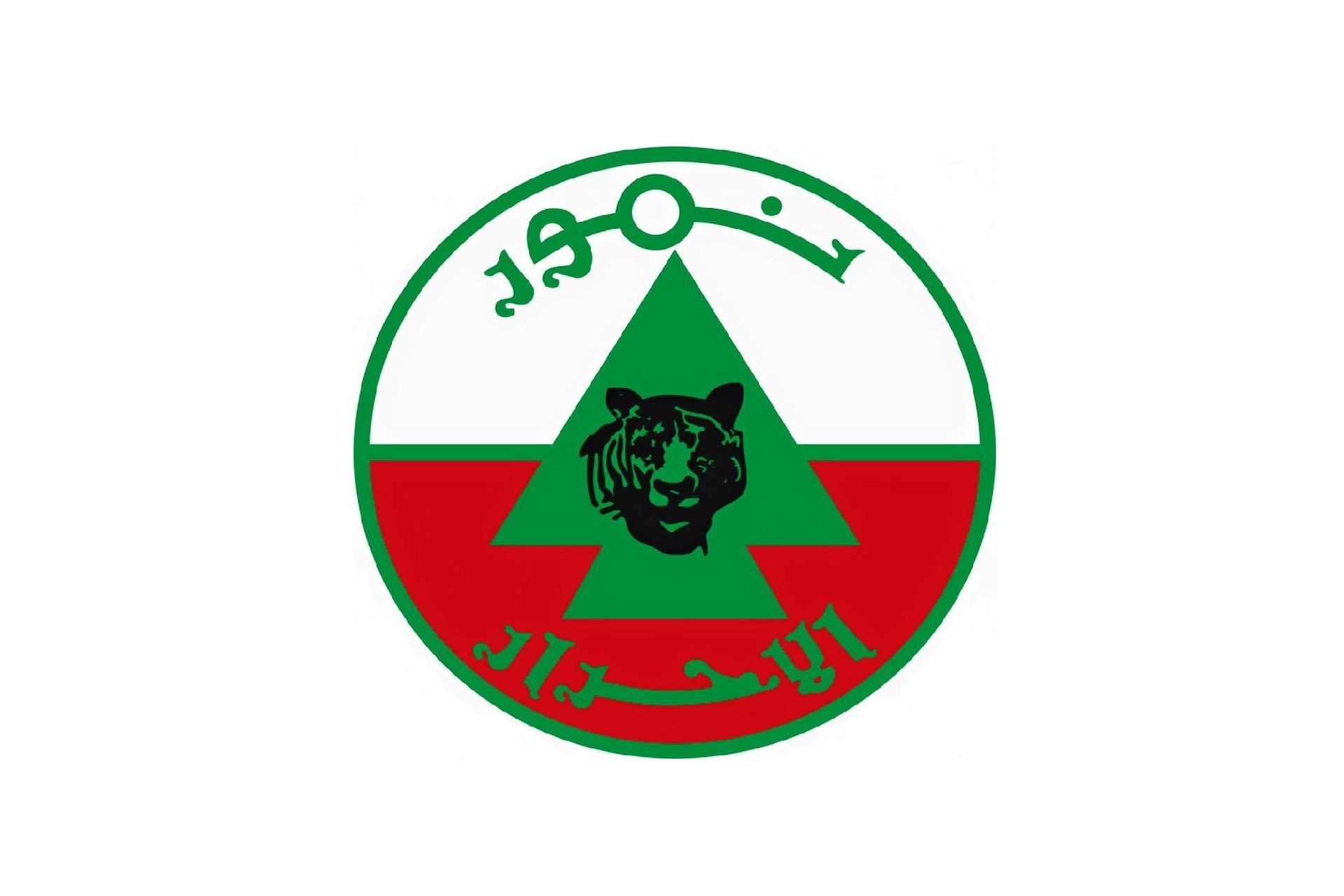
- Flag of the NLP Tigers Militia (1968–1980)
- Leaders: Naim Berdkan, Dany Chamoun, Dory Chamoun
- Dates active: October 1968 – August 1980
- Headquarters: Sodeco Square (Achrafieh – Beirut), Safra
- Active regions: East Beirut, Mount Lebanon, South Lebanon
- Ideology: Lebanese nationalism National liberalism Anti-communism; Anti-Palestinianism; Anti-pan-Arabism; Maronite interests
- Political position: Centre-right to right-wing
- Size: 5,000 fighters
- Part of: National Liberal Party; Lebanese Front; Lebanese Forces
- Wars: Lebanese Civil War

The Tigers militia (Arabic: نمور الأحرار, transliterated: Numūr al-Aḥrar), also known as the NLP Tigers or PNL "Lionceaux" and Milice des Tigres in French and Tigers of the Liberals (Arabic: نمور الليبراليين, transliterated: Numūr al-Lībrāliyyīn) was the military wing of the National Liberal Party (NLP) during the 1975-78 phase of the Lebanese Civil War. Established in the late 1960s, the NLP militia was the second major faction within the Lebanese nationalist Christian Lebanese Front coalition under the leadership of Dany Chamoun, son of the NLP's president Camille Chamoun, from 1976 until 1980, when it was forcefully incorporated into the Lebanese Forces.

== Origins ==
The NLP militia was first raised in October 1968 by the former President of Lebanon Camille Chamoun at his home town of Es-Saadiyat, in the predominantly Maronite region of Mount Lebanon. Chamoun was an important za'im, or political boss, being the patriarch of the prominent political Chamoun family. He held a number of important political positions in Lebanon, most importantly as Head of State, but he served also as minister of defense, minister of the interior, and minister of finance. While president, he established the National Liberal Party in 1958, and ten years later, he founded the Tigers militia, intended to be the military wing of the party, originally under the title Brigade of the Lebanese Tigers – BLT (Arabic: كتيبة النمور اللبنانية| Katībat al-Numūr al-Lubnāniyya) or Brigade des Lionceaux Libanais (BLL) in French, allegedly taken from his middle name, Nimr – meaning "Tiger" in Arabic. Initially just 500-men strong, the BLT was organized, trained, and led by the "defence secretary" of the NLP, Naim Berdkan; after his death in action in January 1976, he was succeeded by Dany Chamoun, Camille Chamoun's younger son.

Initially located in the NLP party offices' at Sodeco Square in the Nasra (Nazareth) neighbourhood of the Achrafieh quarter in Beirut, the Tigers' military HQ was relocated in 1978 to Safra, a boat marina and tourist beach resort located 25 km north of the Lebanese capital in the Keserwan District, where it remained until the militia's dissolution.

== Structure and organization ==
Under the command of Dany Chamoun, the Tigers had become by 1978 the second largest force in the Christian Lebanese Front, and although the Chamouns never achieved with their own militia the same level of organizational efficiency displayed by the rival Phalange' Kataeb Regulatory Forces militia, they were nonetheless capable of aligning 3,500 men and women, though other sources list a total of 4,000, which included civilian recruits and deserters from the Lebanese Army. However, some unconfirmed sources advance an even higher number, about 15,000. Their 500 full-time fighters and 3,000 part-time reservists were organized into armoured, 'commando', infantry, artillery, signals, medical, logistics and military police branches. The Tigers' own chain of command was predominantly Maronite, though the rank-and-file were drawn from the 150,000 Maronite, Greek-Orthodox, Druze and Shi'ite militants of the NLP and trained in-country at clandestine facilities; first set up by the NLP in 1966 these training centres were located at Naas in the Matn District, Es-Saadiyat in the Iqlim al-Kharrub coastal enclave south of Beirut and at Adma in the northern mountainous Keserwan District. Upon the outbreak of the Lebanese Civil War in April 1975, the government of Israel secretly assisted the NLP Tigers with training and materiel aid, and from 1976 onwards, the israelis provided US$50 million-worth of weaponry and equipment per year to the Tigers and other Christian militias, after several clandestine contacts were made between Dany Chamoun and the Mossad.

NLP militia units operated mainly in East Beirut, the Byblos, Matn and Keserwan Districts and Tripoli, but also had a presence at Zahlé in the Beqaa Valley, at the south in the Iqlim al-Kharrub, the Aley District and the Jabal Amel, where their local militants – after merging with other Christian, Shia Muslim and Druze militias – played a key part in the formation on 21 October 1976 of the Israeli-backed informal "Army for the Defense of South Lebanon" or ADSL (French: Armée de Défense du Liban-Sud or ADLS), later to become known as the "Free Lebanese Army" (FLA), the predecessor of the South Lebanon Army (SLA).

== Illegal activities and controversy ==
Financing for the NLP Tigers' came at first from both Chamoun's personal fortune and from protection rackets collected in the areas under their control, though they also received outside support. Conservative Arab countries such as Jordan provided covert funding, weapons, munitions, training and other non-lethal assistance. Most of it entered towards the illegal ports of Tabarja and Dbayeh, both located north of Beirut in the Keserwan District, set up in early 1976 and administered by Joseph Abboud, former personal chauffeur and hunting partner of Camille Chamoun, who ran drug-smuggling and arms contraband activities on the behalf of the NLP until October 1980, when the Lebanese Forces brought the ports under their control. The NLP and its military wing did edit their own official newspaper, "The Battles" (Arabic: Ma'arik), but they never set up a radio or television service.

Ruthless fighters with a reputation of aggressiveness, often initiating hostilities with the opposition side, aggravated by their lack of discipline and restraint, the Tigers were also involved in several other acts of sectarian violence. On December 16, 1975, despite a ceasefire established the previous day, the NLP militia forcibly displaced all the 450 residents of Sebnay, a Muslim village southeast of Beirut, in the predominantly Maronite neighborhood of Hadath, Baabda District.

On January 18, 1976, the NLP Tigers participated alongside the Army of Free Lebanon, Al-Tanzim, Kataeb Regulatory Forces, Lebanese Youth Movement and the Guardians of the Cedars in the massacres of the Palestinian refugees and Lebanese Muslim residents of the Karantina and Al-Masklah refugee camps and adjoining slums in east Beirut, and later on June 28, Dany Chamoun led its men in the final assault on the Tel el-Zaatar Palestinian refugee camp, which resulted in a significant loss of life and the forceful displacement of its Palestinian residents when the camp fell. During the Karantina siege, Dany Chamoun gave on April 22 that year a televised interview to Thames Television in which he denied that it was a "ruthless operation", instead referring to it as a "concise military operation" aimed at reclaiming private property.

Towards the end of the 1970s, however, rivalries within the Lebanese Front coalition strained the relationship between the NLP Tigers' and their erstwhile Christian allies, leading them to violent confrontation with the Phalangists and the Guardians of the Cedars. The Tigers' even battled these two factions in May 1979 for control of the Furn esh Shebbak and Ain El Remmaneh districts in Beirut, and for the town of Akoura in the Byblos District.

== List of NLP Tigers commanders ==
- Naim Berdkan (October 1968–January 1976)
- Dany Chamoun (January 1976–July 1980)
- Dory Chamoun (July–August 1980)

=== NLP Tigers junior commanders ===
- Freddy Nasrallah
- Bob Azzam
- Dr. Naji Hayek
- Georges Araj
- Elias El-Hannouche (الحنش | a.k.a. 'Hannache')
- Nouhad Chelhot
- Jean Eid
- Nabil Nassif
- Paul Sefar
- Toufic Nehme (a.k.a. 'Abou Antoun')
- Tony Chamoun (Zahle)

=== Other NLP Tigers personnel ===
- Rudolf Polikovic – Head of the fifth division, and the official spokesperson to foreign media of the NLP Tigers Militia.

== The Tigers in the Lebanese civil war ==
=== Early expansion phase 1975–1977 ===
Upon the outbreak of the civil war in April 1975, the NLP Tigers immediately engaged the leftist Lebanese National Movement (LNM) militias and their Palestinian PLO allies, being heavily committed in several battles in and outside the Beirut area. In October 1975, they supported their Phalangist allies of the Kataeb Regulatory Forces (KRF) militia against the Al-Mourabitoun and the Nasserite Correctionist Movement (NCM) for the control of the Hotels district in centre Beirut.

In January 1976 the collapse of the Lebanese Armed Forces (LAF) enabled the Tigers to take over Army barracks and depots located at Achrafieh, Ain El Remmaneh, Hadath, Baabda, and Hazmiyeh districts of East Beirut, seizing heavy weapons and enrolling defectors into their ranks. The Tigers later joined in March that year the allied Christian Lebanese Front militias in the defense of the Mount Lebanon region and the Aley District against the combined LNM-PLO-Lebanese Arab Army (LAA) 'Spring Offensive'. During the Hundred Days' War in February 1978 the Tigers, backed by the Tyous Team of Commandos (TTC), put a spirited defence of the Achrafieh and Fayadieh districts in support of the Army of Free Lebanon (AFL) against the Syrian Army.

=== Reversals and decline 1978–1980 ===
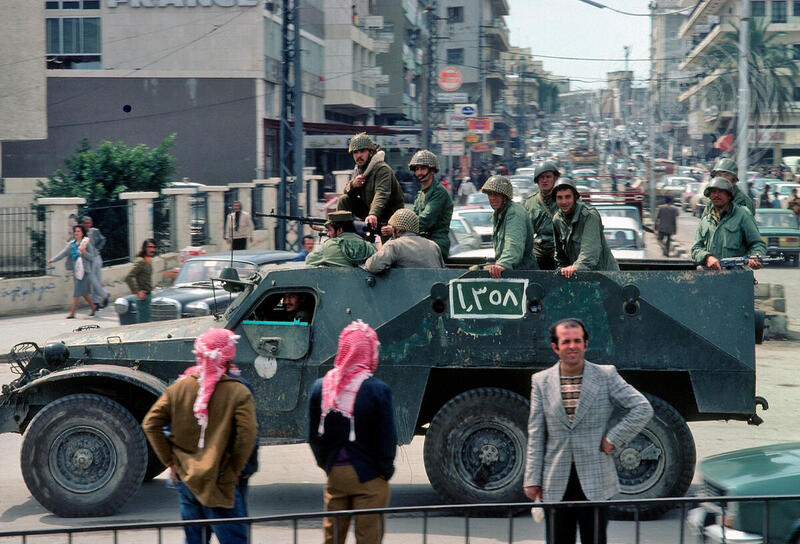
A Syrian BTR-152 armoured personnel carrier patrols the streets of the Lebanese port city of Saida (Sidon), March 1978.

The Tigers' involvement in these campaigns, however, cost them the loss of the Iqlim al-Kharrub to the LNM-PLO alliance supported by Palestine Liberation Army units on 20–22 January 1976, which they failed to defend despite being backed by ISF units and Lebanese Army troops. The fall of this important stronghold was a severe blow to the NLP and the Tigers (coupled by the death in action of their commander Naim Berdkan), depriving them of their main recruiting area along with their local training infrastructure, chiefly the Es-Saadiyat camp, and the port towns of Damour and Jiyeh.

Relations between the NLP political board and the Tigers' military command soured after the former, headed by Camille Chamoun, supported Syria's military intervention in June that year whereas the latter, now led by Camille's son Dany Chamoun, opposed it. Fearing that its own party's militia was getting out of his control, Camille tacitly allowed its Kataeb rivals to absorb the Tigers' into the Lebanese Forces (LF) under Bachir Gemayel. Resentful of the growing power of his young adversary Bachir Gemayel, Dany Chamoun made clear that he objected the former's own domination of the LF Command Council and refused to allow the incorporation of the NLP Tigers into the LF structure, an act that led to a Phalangist assault of his militia's headquarters in Safra on July 7, 1980, which resulted in a massacre that claimed up to 500 lives, including civilians and 80 of Dany's men (other source states that the dead toll amounted to 150 Tigers' fighters).

While their leader Dany was rushed to exile, first to Syria and then to Paris, France, after handing over the command of the Tigers to his elder brother Dory Chamoun, the militia was officially disbanded on Camille's orders in late August. Soon afterwards, the Phalangists seized nearly all of the Tigers' positions in and outside East Beirut, including the vital Naas and Adma training camps. The remaining 3,000 or so demoralised militiamen either surrendered their weapons to the Lebanese Army or the Lebanese Forces and returned home or found themselves being consolidated by the end of October of that year into the Damouri Brigade within the LF.

=== Revival and disbandment 1983–1990 ===
The Israeli invasion of Lebanon in June 1982, coupled by the death of the LF supremo Bachir Gemayel in September that year brought the resurgence of the National Liberals into the political scene, although the efforts by Camille Chamoun to revive the Tigers militia in 1983–84 proved less successful. The small force of only 100 or so lightly equipped fighters they gathered proved incapable of competing with the Lebanese Forces' military might, being relegated to the role of a mere bodyguard for the NLP political leaders for the remainer of the war.

Upon the end of the civilian strife in October 1990 and the subsequent assassination of Dany Chamoun – who had succeeded his late father at the NLP's presidency in October 1987 – the last remaining National Liberals' paramilitary organization operating in east Beirut was ordered by the new Lebanese Government on March 28, 1991, to disband and surrender their weaponry by April 30 as stipulated by the Taif Agreement. The NLP Tigers are no longer active.

== The Free Tigers ==
Free Tigers نومور الحر
- Leader: Elias El-Hannouche
- Dates active: 1980–1981
- Active regions: Beirut, Beqaa Valley, Zahlé
- Size: 200 men
- Wars: Lebanese Civil War

The Free Tigers (Arabic: نومور الحر , transliterated: Numūr al-Hurr) or Lionceaux Libres in French, also known variously as the "Hannache Group", "Hannache's Tigers" or "Lionceaux d'Hannache", were a dissident splinter group of the NLP Tigers formed soon after the forcible merger of the latter into the Lebanese Forces in July 1980. Defying the official orders to disband, about 200 Tigers' militiamen commanded by Elias El-Hannouche (nom de guerre 'Hannache') went underground to wage a guerrilla war against the LF, operating in the Hadath and Ain El Remmaneh districts of East Beirut from August to late October 1980. The Free Tigers are believed to have been responsible for some bomb and guerrilla attacks in East Beirut, including an ambush with combined rocket- and small-arms' fire on the U.S. ambassador John Gunther Dean's motorcade in August that year (intended to discredit the LF), followed on 10 November by two car-bomb explosions on the Achrafieh quarter that left 10 dead and 62 wounded.

Defeated after a four-day street battle despite being backed by Lebanese Army troops sent upon request of the NLP president Camille Chamoun and forced out in mid-November of their last remaining strongholds at Ain El Rammaneh by the LF, Hannache and a number of its dissident Tigers fled across the Green Line into the Muslim-controlled western sector of the Lebanese Capital. Once there, they placed themselves under the protection of the Palestinian Fatah intelligence service before moving to the Syrian-controlled Beqaa Valley.

Believed to have become an agent of the Syrian regime, Hannache instigated the Battle of Zahleh by deliberately provoking the LF militia forces defending the Greek-Catholic town of Zahlé to engage in a gunfight, so that the Syrian troops would become involved. On 14 December 1980, Hannache and 50 Free Tigers' militiamen stormed and seized the Hoche el-Oumara suburb of Zahlé, before being driven out by local LF units the following day; the Free Tigers returned to Zahlé on December 20 and managed to seize by force the former NLP party offices' but they were resisted by the LF and subsequently forced to withdraw from the town on December 22 under Syrian Army protection. The Free Tigers seemed to have remained operational until 1981, though very little was heard from them afterwards.

== Weapons and equipment ==
The Tigers received covert support not only from the Lebanese Army in the pre-war years, but also from the United States, Iran, Jordan and Egypt since 1973, followed by Israel and Syria in 1976–77, who provided weapons and heavy equipment. In addition, the collapse of the Lebanese Armed Forces (LAF) and the Internal Security Forces (ISF) in January 1976, coupled by the massive influx of Israeli military aid, allowed NLP militia units to re-equip themselves with modern small-arms and military vehicles seized from LAF barracks and ISF Police stations or supplied by the Israelis. Additional weapons and other military equipments were procured in the international black market. Besides providing training, weapons and ammunition, the Lebanese Army also lent to the NLP Tigers sophisticated mobile communications equipment.

=== Small arms ===
Tigers' militiamen were provided with a variety of small arms, including Mauser Karabiner 98k, Lee–Enfield SMLE Mk III and MAS-36 bolt-action rifles, Carl Gustaf m/45, MAT-49 and PPSh-41 submachine guns, M2 and SIG SG 543 carbines, MAS-49, M1 Garand (or its Italian-produced copy, the Beretta Model 1952), Vz. 52, SKS, Beretta BM 59 and M14 semi-automatic rifles, Heckler & Koch G3, CETME Model C, FN FAL (variants included the Israeli-produced 'lightened' ROMAT), FN CAL, M16A1, SIG SG 542, Vz. 58, AK-47 and AKM assault rifles (other variants included the Zastava M70, Chinese Type 56, Romanian Pistol Mitralieră model 1963/1965, Bulgarian AKK/AKKS and former East German MPi-KMS-72 assault rifles). Several models of handguns were used, including Smith & Wesson Model 10, Smith & Wesson Model 13, Smith & Wesson Model 14, Smith & Wesson Model 15, Smith & Wesson Model 17 and Smith & Wesson Model 19 revolvers, Colt M1911A1, Tokarev TT-33, CZ 75, FN P35 and MAB PA-15 pistols. FN FAL, HK G3 and M16A1 assault rifles equipped with telescopic sights, and Enfield L42A1 (military version) rifles were used for sniping.

Squad weapons consisted of Chatellerault FM Mle 1924/29, Bren Mk. I .303 (7.7mm), MG 34, MG 42, Heckler & Koch HK21, AA-52, RPD, RPK and FN MAG light machine guns, with heavier Besa Mark III 7.92mm, Browning M1919A4 .30 Cal, Browning M2HB .50 Cal, SG-43/SGM Goryunov and DShKM machine guns being employed as platoon and company weapons. Grenade launchers and portable anti-tank weapons comprised M203 grenade launchers, 88.9mm Instalaza M65, RL-83 Blindicide, M72 LAW, RPG-2 and RPG-7 rocket launchers, whilst crew-served and indirect fire weapons included M2 60mm mortars, 82-PM-41 82mm mortars and 120-PM-38 (M-1938) 120mm heavy mortars, plus B-10 82mm, B-11 107mm and M40A1 106mm recoilless rifles (often mounted on technicals).

=== Armoured and transport vehicles ===
The Tigers' own armoured corps was created in early 1976, equipped with an assortment of ex-Lebanese Army M41A3 Walker Bulldog and AMX-13 light tanks, Charioteer tanks, M42A1 Duster SPAAGs, M113 and Panhard M3 VTT Armoured personnel carriers, Cadillac Gage V-100 Commando armoured cars, Bravia V-200 Chaimite armoured cars, Staghound armoured cars, and Panhard AML-90 armoured cars. These were bolstered by twenty Israeli-supplied M50 Super Sherman Tanks, M3/M9 Zahlam half-tracks and BTR-152 APCs, later joined by two M41A3 light tanks captured from the Lebanese Arab Army in July 1976.

The NLP militia also raised a mechanized force of gun trucks and 'technicals', comprising M151A1 utility trucks, VIASA MB-CJ6 and Willys M38A1 MD jeeps (or its civilian version, the Jeep CJ-5), UAZ-469, Land-Rover series II-III, Santana Series III (Spanish-produced version of the Land-Rover long wheelbase series III), Morattab Series IV (Iranian-produced unlicensed version of the Land-Rover long wheelbase series III), Toyota Land Cruiser (J40), Toyota Land Cruiser (J45), Peugeot 404, Dodge Power Wagon W200, Dodge D series (3rd generation), GMC Sierra Custom K25/K30, Chevrolet C-10/C-15 Cheyenne and Chevrolet C-20 Scottsdale light pickups, and Toyota Dyna U10-series trucks armed with heavy machine guns, recoilless rifles, and anti-aircraft autocannons. For logistical support, the Tigers relied on Range Rover 1st generation and Toyota Land Cruiser (J42) hardtop light pickups, Toyota U10-series route vans (minibus), Chevrolet C-50 medium-duty, Dodge F600 medium-duty, GMC C4500 medium-duty trucks and GMC C7500 heavy-duty cargo trucks; a number of Volkswagen Type 2 Transporter minibuses were used as military ambulances.

=== Artillery ===
They also fielded a powerful artillery corps equipped with British QF Mk III 25-Pounder field guns, French Mle 1950 BF-50 155mm howitzers, Soviet M1954 (M-46) 130mm towed field guns, Soviet AZP S-60 57mm anti-aircraft guns, British Bofors 40mm L/60 anti-aircraft guns and anti-aircraft autocannons. The latter consisted of Yugoslav Zastava M55 20mm triple-barreled, Soviet ZPU (ZPU-1, ZPU-2, ZPU-4) 14.5mm and ZU-23-2 23mm AA autocannons (mostly mounted on technicals and transport trucks), which were employed in both air defense and direct fire supporting roles. In addition to field artillery and AA autocannons, the Tigers also employed SNEB 68mm (2.7-inch) unguided rocket projectiles fired from locally built eight-tube Multiple rocket launchers installed on Technicals.

== Uniforms and insignia ==
NLP Tigers' militiamen usually wore in the field a mix of military uniforms and civilian clothes, though they were known to have worn a variety of battle dress, depending on whom they allied to and what other armed forces were occupying the areas where the militia operated in the East Beirut canton, the Iqlim al-Kharrub coastal enclave, and Southern Lebanon.

=== Fatigue clothing ===
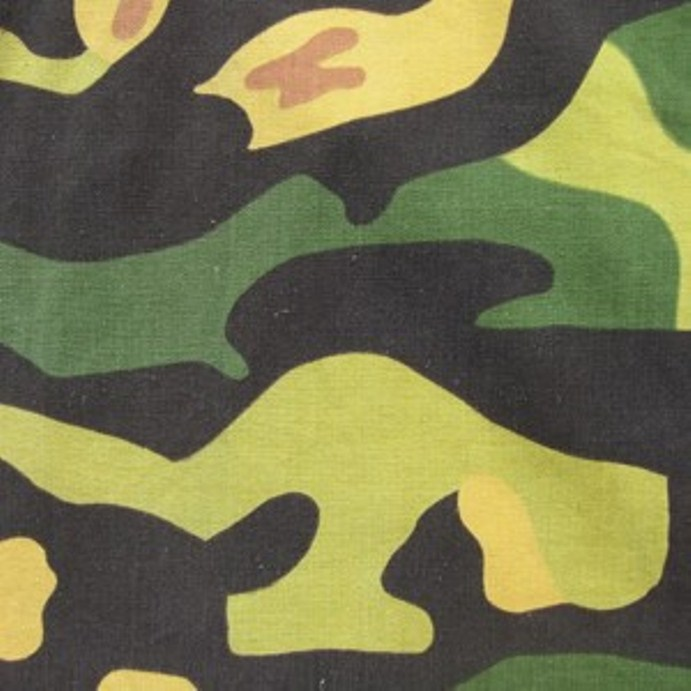
NLP Tigers Militia Czechoslovak Vz 60 "Salamander" (Mlok) pattern.

The NLP Tigers adopted early on the Lebanese Army olive green fatigues (a special domestic variant of the US Army OG-107 cotton sateen utilities) as their standard field dress, though surplus American olive green tropical uniforms, the US Army OG-107 utilities and the M1967 Jungle Utility Uniform, and later Israeli olive drab Uniform "B" (Hebrew: Madei Bet) fatigues were used as well.

Camouflage uniforms consisted of "Leopard spot" pattern fatigues of either Belgian or Polish origin, Czechoslovak Vz 60 "Salamander" (Mlok) pattern fatigues, Syrian or captured PLO Lizard horizontal and vertical patterns' fatigues, and Lebanese Army Lizard-style pattern (colloquially nicknamed mlukhiyah, a.k.a. molokhia or molohiya) fatigues; the latter was a unique Lebanese-designed pattern which incorporated dense vertical stripes of dark brown and olive green on a pinkish-tan or khaki background. Originally developed in the late 1960s or early 1970s for the Lebanese Commando Regiment, this pattern saw widespread usage with the Christian Lebanese Front militias. During its brief revival in the 1980s, NLP Tigers militiamen were seen wearing U.S. Woodland Battle Dress Uniforms (BDU) or locally produced cheap copies. Civilian or surplus military Parkas and OG US M-1965 field jackets were worn in cold weather.

=== Headgear ===
Standard headgear for all-ranks was the ex-Lebanese Army Olive Green OG-106 Baseball cap, though drab green French M1949 bush hats, and blue or olive green bucket hats were also used, along with OG or khaki Baseball-style field caps provided with a folding round neck flap (which, judging from photographic evidence, appeared to have been quite popular among Christian Lebanese Front militiamen). Camouflage baseball caps in the Lebanese mlukhiyah pattern and field caps in the "leopard spot" pattern were also used. Besides fatigue caps and bucket hats, black, midnight blue and maroon berets were worn French-style, pulled to the left; fur-lined cloth bomber hats, civilian knitted woollen caps and military commando caps of various colours were used in the winter.

Cloth or fabric hoods with eye holes, rib-knit single-slit, two-hole or three-hole balaclavas, and dark green plastic or cloth face masks attached to field caps were worn by NLP Tigers' militiamen to conceal identity.

=== Footwear ===
NLP Tigers Militia footwear was diverse. Black leather combat boots initially came from Lebanese Army stocks, the US Army M-1967 model with DMS "ripple" pattern rubber sole and the French Army "Rangers" BM65 (French: Rangers de l'Armée Française BM65) with double-buckle ankle cuff or were provided by Israel, complemented by high-top Pataugas khaki or olive green canvas-and-rubber patrol boots. Several models of civilian sneakers or "trainers" and "chucks", black Beatle boots, black or brown leather laced low shoes, boat shoes, loafers, commercial plastic or rubber slides and flip-flops, and leather sandals were also used by NLP Tigers' militiamen.

=== Helmets and body armour ===
In the field, NLP Tigers' infantrymen could be found wearing a variety of helmet types, consisting of US M-1 and French M1951 NATO (French: Casque Mle 1951 OTAN) steel helmets taken from Lebanese Army stocks or provided by Israel, British RAC Mk II helmets, Mk III/MK IV "Turtle" helmets of British or Belgian origin and Soviet SSh-60 helmets, the latter probably obtained through Syrian Army sources. Armoured crews, depending on the vehicle they manned, received the standard Lebanese Army dark green tanker's compressed fibre-and-leather crash helmet (French copy of the World War II US Army M-1938 Tanker Helmet, nicknamed the "Gruyére") or the OR-601 and OR-603 tanker's helmets in ballistic Kevlar (Israeli copies of the US fibreglass "bone dome" Combat Vehicle Crewman (CVC) T-56-6 helmet and CVC DH-132 helmet, respectively) provided by Israel. In addition to helmets, some Tigers' militiamen also used captured flak jackets, in the form of the Ballistic Nylon US M-1952/69 "Half-collar" vest.

=== Accoutrements ===
Web gear consisted of Soviet three-cell and four-cell AK-47 magazine pouches in khaki or olive green canvas, Czechoslovak four-cell Vz 58 brown leather magazine pouches, ChiCom Type 56 AK, Type 56 SKS and Type 63 SKS chest rigs in khaki or olive green cotton fabric for the AK-47 assault rifle and the SKS semi-automatic rifle, plus several variants of locally made, multi-pocket chest rigs and assault vests in camouflage cloth, khaki and OG canvas. Brown and Black leather belt pouches of various shapes and sizes were locally produced in sets of one, two and three to hold pistol and assault rifles' magazines. In addition, the US Army M-1956 load-carrying equipment (LCE) in khaki cotton canvas captured from the Lebanese Army, and the IDF 1950's "Old style" Tan-Khaki cotton canvas equipment (similar in design to the British Army's 58 pattern webbing) were also widely used. Anti-tank teams issued with the RPG-2 and RPG-7 rocket launchers received the correspondent Soviet rocket bag models in khaki canvas, the gunner backpack 6SH12, the assistant gunner backpack and the munitions bag 6SH11; Polish and East German versions in rubberized canvas were employed as well.

=== Insignia ===
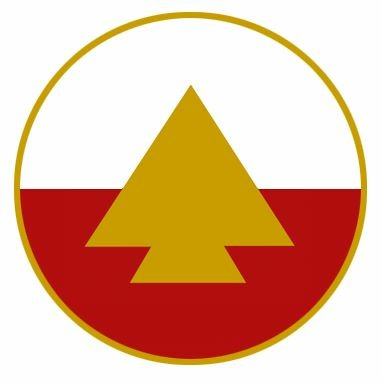
National Liberal Party (NLP) logo (1958–present), used on pin-back badges, paper stickers and printed on T-shirts.

NLP Tigers Militia patch (1975–1980), worn on combat fatigues and brassards.

The NLP Tigers Militia apparently never devised a system of rank, branch or unit insignia of their own, although its personnel did wear a variety of field recognition signs. A forest green cloth, fabric or canvas brassard of roughly triangular shape and attached to a shoulder strap, bearing the round printed or embroidered full-colour Tigers Militia logo was worn on either the upper left shoulder or the right shoulder, whilst a red brassard appears to have been given to the members of the Tigers Militia Military Police corps. Another version of the brassard was also issued, patterned after the NLP official flag, which consisted of two horizontal bands of white (top) and red (bottom) with a stylized Lebanese Cedar tree in Gold set on the centre. In alternative to a brassard, a simple white cloth armband with the Tigers militia emblem printed on could be worn on the left arm.

An olive green nametape bearing "Tigers Militia" inscribed in yellow Arabic script, with the NLP logo set in the middle was occasionally worn above the right shirt pocket on field dress; a full-colour cloth woven or embroidered Tigers Militia round patch was also issued to all ranks, although its placement varied greatly. Photographic evidence shows that it could be displayed either on the right upper shoulder, left upper shoulder, left breast pocket or right breast pocket. A round metal enamelled badge bearing the NLP logo was frequently seen among Tigers militiamen, who usually wore it French-style on the left or right breast suspended from a pocket hanger, but also could be founded in the form of a pin-back badge pinned to combat uniforms, berets, baseball caps, field caps and bucket hats. The NLP Tigers did develop though a standard beret cap badge, which consisted of a miniature detailed Lebanese Cedar tree issued in gilt metal to all-ranks and worn placed above the right eye in the usual French manner. Interestingly, many period photos also show that Tigers militiamen often applied round printed paper stickers bearing their militia's logo to their steel helmets, assault rifles' stocks and the pouches of chest rigs.

Long-sleeved pullover collarless sweatshirts and turtleneck sweaters in thick forest green cotton cloth with the Tigers Militia logo in white printed on the left side of the upper chest, plus white, light forest green, light khaki, light blue and black T-shirts printed with either the Lebanese National Flag, the NLP or Tigers Militia logo, unit and sub-unit insignia or the militia leaders' effigy were commonly worn by NLP Tigers' fighters.

== Legacy ==
Since 2002, several former NLP Tigers' commanders known for their right-wing, nationalist leanings, rallied in support of General Michel Aoun and went on to occupy various key positions within the Aounist Free Patriotic Movement (FPM) hierarchy, ranging from political (Dr Naji Hayek and Georges Aaraj) to security (Jean Eid). In 2015 Jean Eid, Georges Aaraj, Nabil Nassif and others founded a new organization named Al-Noumour, which strives to rally what is left of the Tigers' legacy. They remain staunch supporters of former President Michel Aoun.

While the Tigers were officially disbanded in 1990, their ideology did not disappeared at the end of the War. According to the website of Al-Noumour, “[t]he tigers will remain alive as long as there would be foreign presence on the Lebanese ground, and foreign interventions in its internal affairs."

The Chamoun family is still involved in politics, and remain prominent within the National Liberal Party. In the 2022 general elections, the NLP itself won one seat in the Lebanese Parliament, which is currently held by Camille Dory Chamoun, the son of Dory Chamoun, Dany Chamoun's elder brother.

== See also ==
- Damour massacre
- Lebanese Civil War
- Lebanese Forces (militia)
- Lebanese Front
- List of extrajudicial killings and political violence in Lebanon
- List of weapons of the Lebanese Civil War
- National Liberal Party (Lebanon)
- People's Liberation Army (Lebanon)
- Phoenicianism
- Safra massacre
- South Lebanon Army
- Tyous Team of Commandos
- Zahliote Group
