= Tracy Chamoun =

Lebanese writer and political activist (born 1960)

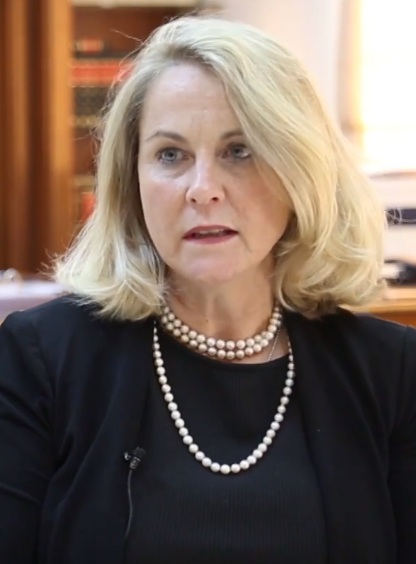
- Chamoun in 2018

Ambassador of Lebanon to Jordan
- In office 19 June 2017 – 7 August 2020
- Succeeded by: Youssef Rajji

Personal details
- Born: 22 October 1960 (age 65)
- Parent: Dany Chamoun (father)
- Relatives: Camille Chamoun (grandfather); Dory Chamoun (uncle); Camille Dory Chamoun (cousin)
- Occupation: Diplomat, writer, politician

Tracy Chamoun (Arabic: ترايسي شمعون; born 22 October 1960) is a Lebanese author, diplomat and political activist of Lebanese and Australian descent. She was the Lebanese ambassador to Jordan from 19 June 2017 until 7 August 2020.

== Early life ==
Tracy Chamoun was born on 22 October 1960 to the Chamoun political family. She is one of two surviving children of Dany Chamoun, the assassinated former leader of the National Liberal Party and son of former President Camille Chamoun; her mother is the late Patti Morgan Chamoun, an Australian fashion model and actress. In October 1990, a militia attacked her father's home and killed him, his second wife and two of their three young children. The Lebanese courts convicted Samir Geagea of the assassination.

== Career ==
=== Dany Chamoun Foundation ===
Through the Dany Chamoun Foundation, Tracy Chamoun has sought to perpetuate the legacy of her father, who, on 21 October 1990, was assassinated together with his second wife and two children. Many received amnesty. Eleven associates are also sentenced. Her autobiography, Au Nom du Pere, centered on her relationship with her father and his life and work. In it, she recounts the harrowing experience in which she and her mother were kidnapped in 1980 during a surprise attack on the National Liberal Party headquarters by Phalangist militiamen under the command of Bachir Gemayel, her father's former ally.

=== Syrian occupation ===
Chamoun was an outspoken critic of the Syrian occupation of Lebanon. She has described her country's independence as a "myth". Before the Independence Day celebrations in 1990 she asked rhetorically:

To what extent does the establishment believe that the population is so blind that it cannot see that the nation is far from independent? Like the myth of the emperor with no clothes, it is a charade that only the sycophants see and celebrate.

=== Political views ===
Chamoun is known for her moderate political views. She became the first woman to found a political party in the Arab world, called the "Liberal Democrats Party of Lebanon" (also translated as the Party of Liberal Democrats of Lebanon). She favors the building of a modern democracy, and has spoken out against what she sees as the feudal political system in which clan loyalties often play a more significant role than ideology in politics.

Chamoun has vowed to continue to remind people of the truth behind the assassination of her slain father which she writes about in her books Le Sang De la Paix published by Lattes in France and (ثمن السلم) published by Antoine in Lebanon.

=== Ambassador ===
She served as ambassador to Jordan from 19 June 2017 to 7 August 2020.when she resigned after the 2020 Beirut explosion, saying the catastrophe showed the need for a change in leadership.

=== Candidacy for presidency ===
On 29 August 2022, she announced her candidacy for president in the 2022 presidential election.

== See also ==
- Chamoun family
- Samir Geagea
