= 1952 Lebanese presidential election =

- 23 September 1952

77 members of the Parliament 51 votes needed to win
- Turnout: 98.70%
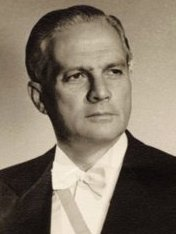

| Nominee | Camille Chamoun | Abdullah Al-Hajj |
| Party | National Liberal | PSP |
| Electoral vote | 74 | 1 |
| Percentage | 98.67% | 1.33% |
President before election
Fouad Chehab (acting)
Military dictatorship
Elected President
Camille Chamoun
National Liberal

An indirect presidential election was held in the Parliament of Lebanon in 1952 following the end of Fouad Chehab's military cabinet. The Parliament of Lebanon elected Camille Chamoun, who at that time was an ally of Kamal Jumblatt and a member of the Progressive Socialist Party parliamentary bloc, as the next president of Lebanon on 23 September 1952 to officially succeed Bechara Khoury's term becoming the second president of the Lebanese Republic. Chamoun won with 74 votes out of the 76 attending MPs.

By convention, the presidency is always attributed to a Maronite Christian. Under the article 49 of the Lebanese Constitution, a qualified majority of two-thirds of the members of the then 77-seat Lebanese Parliament is required to elect the president in the first round. After the second round of election, the president is elected by an absolute majority of the total number of deputies in office.

== Results ==
76 out of the 77 MPs of parliament were present. The round of voting saw Camille Chamoun winning 74 votes and 1 vote for Shiite deputy Abdullah Al-Haj along with 1 blank ballot.

| Candidate | Votes | % |
|---|---|---|
| Camille Chamoun | 74 | 98.67 |
| Abdullah Al-Hajj | 1 | 1.33 |
| Total | 75 | 100.00 |
| Blank votes | 1 | 1.32 |
| Total votes | 76 | – |
| Registered voters/turnout | 77 | 98.70 |

== Aftermath ==
During Chamoun's presidency, Lebanon experienced an economic boom, in particular in the construction, banking and tourism sectors. He implemented a 1954 law on the creation of joint-stock companies and a 1956 law on banking secrecy. According to Fawwaz Traboulsi, Chamoun concentrated power into his hands, blurring the limits of democracy and autocracy.

Near the end of his term, Pan-Arabists and other groups backed by Gamal Abdel Nasser, with considerable support in Lebanon's Muslim (particularly Sunni) community attempted to overthrow Chamoun's government in June 1958 after Chamoun tried to seek another term as president against the constitution. The mood may have been itself indicative of the fact that nine prime ministers formed cabinets under the six years of Chamoun's presidency since Sunni politicians were not always able to justify their association with his politics to their constituencies and popular power base. That fact was evident in the pressures that faced the El-Bizri political base in Sidon, and the longstanding parliamentarian Dr. Nazih El-Bizri served as a cabinet minister during Chamoun's term. Facing unrest in the country, with its epicentre in Sidon at the start of the protests, Chamoun eventually appealed to the United States for help under the new Eisenhower Doctrine, and American Marines landed in Beirut. Moreover, Naim Moghabghab, a close friend and political ally, formed and led a military group to reinforce Chamoun's position. Many battles occurred, mainly in Beirut and in the Chouf district, where clashes between Naim Moghabghab and Kamal Jumblatt's men led to bloody fights. The revolt was squashed, but to appease Muslim anger, General Fuad Chehab, who claimed to be a Christian enjoying considerable popularity in the Muslim community, was elected to succeed Chamoun.
