= Chamoun family =

Lebanese political family

Chamoun (Arabic: شمعون, romanized: Shamʿūn) is a Lebanese political family.

== Camille Chamoun ==
Camille was the head of the family. He was elected as a deputy five times, and served as minister multiple times, most notably in the first cabinet of Riad Solh. In 1952, he was elected president, and served in office until 1958. He founded the National Liberal Party, and its military wing, the Tigers Militia. He participated in the Lebanese Civil War.

== Dory Chamoun ==
Dory is the oldest son of Camille, and serves as the president of the National Liberal Party.

== Dany Chamoun ==
Dany was the youngest son of Camille who led the Tigers Militia.

== Tracy Chamoun ==
Tracy is the daughter of Dany. She served as the Ambassador of Lebanon to Jordan from 2017 until her resignation in 2020.

== Jackie Chamoun ==
Jackie is the grand daughter of Dory, daughter of Gabriel Chamoun and Denise Chehab.

== See also ==
- List of political families in Lebanon
