= Camille Chamoun =

President of Lebanon from 1952 to 1958

Camille Chamoun OM ONC
- كميل شمعون
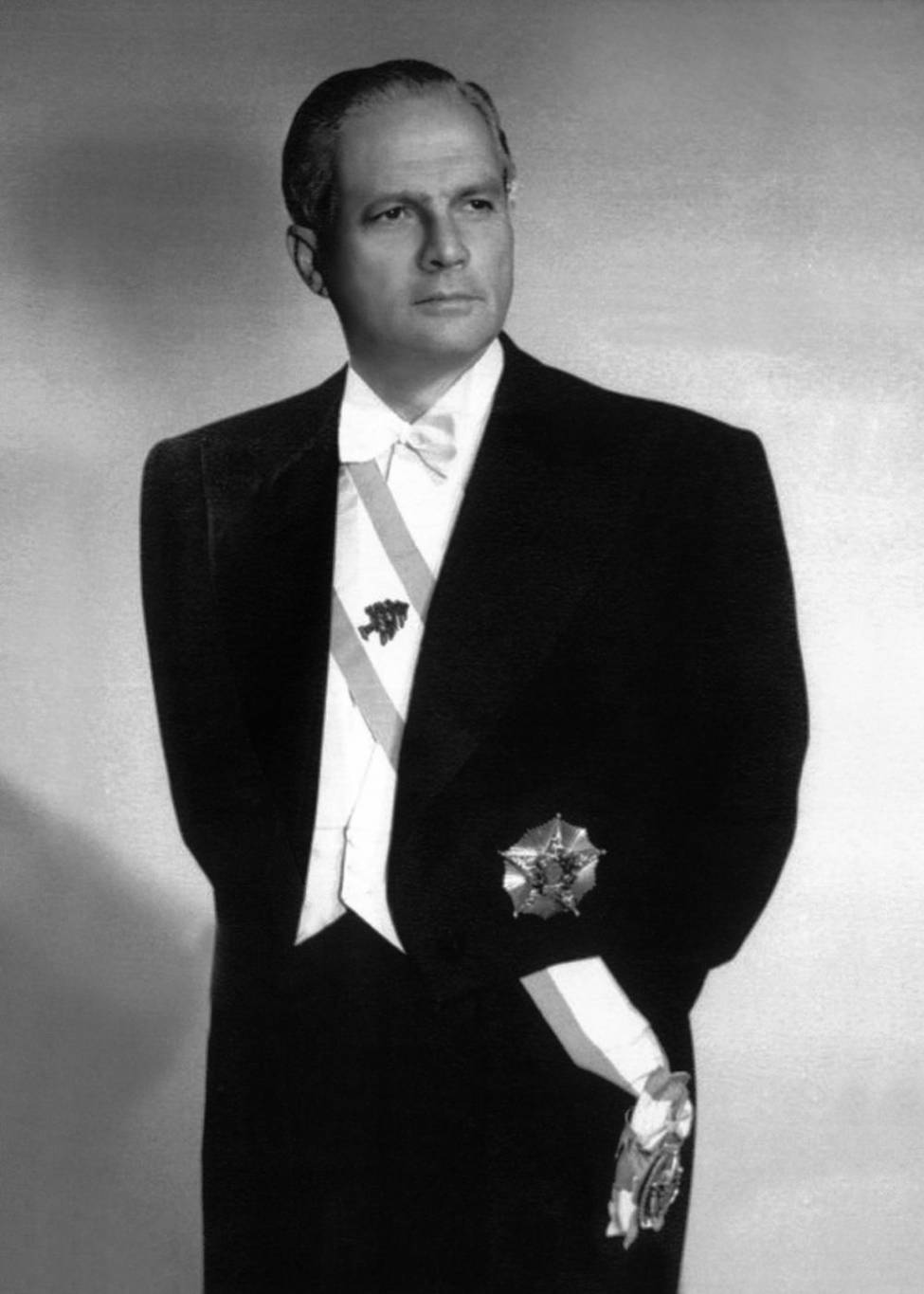
- Official portrait, 1952

2nd President of Lebanon
- In office 23 September 1952 – 22 September 1958
- Prime Minister: See list: Abdallah El-Yafi; Khaled Chehab; Saeb Salam; Abdallah El-Yafi; Sami as-Solh; Rashid Karami; Abdallah El-Yafi; Sami as-Solh; Khalil al-Hibri (Acting)
- Preceded by: Bechara El Khoury
- Succeeded by: Fouad Chehab

Member of the Lebanese Parliament
- In office 1934–1952
- In office 1960–1964
- In office 1968–1987

Leader of National Liberal Party
- In office 10 September 1958 – 1985
- Preceded by: Post established
- Succeeded by: Dany Chamoun

Personal details
- Born: 3 April 1900 Deir el Qamar, Mount Lebanon Mutasarrifate, Ottoman Empire
- Died: 7 August 1987 (aged 87) Beirut, Lebanon
- Party: Constitutional Bloc (1934–?); Independent (1951–1958); National Liberal Party (1958–1987)
- Spouse: Zelpha Tabet (m. 1930; died 1971)
- Children: Dory, Dany
- Relatives: Camille Dory Chamoun (grandson); Tracy Chamoun (granddaughter); Auguste Adib Pacha (uncle)
- Education: Saint Joseph University
- Religion: Maronite Catholic Christian

Camille Nimr Chamoun OM, ONC (Arabic: كميل نمر شمعون, romanized: Kamīl Nimr Shamʿūn, pronounced [kaˈmiːl ʃamˈʕuːn]; 3 April 1900 – 7 August 1987) was a Lebanese politician and statesman who served as the 2nd president of Lebanon from 1952 to 1958. He was one of the country's main Christian leaders during most of the Lebanese Civil War and considered a za'im (political hegemon) in Lebanon.

Born in Deir al-Qamar, into the Maronite Chamoun family, Camille Chamoun was a nephew of Lebanese Prime Minister Auguste Adib Pacha. He studied at Saint Joseph University and initially pursued a career in law and journalism before being elected to the Parliament of Lebanon. He served as finance minister in 1938 and then as interior minister and minister of telegraph and post from 1943 to 1944 during Lebanon's first post-independence government. Chamoun was elected to the presidency of Lebanon in 1952.

During his presidency, Lebanon experienced an economic boom, with Chamoun promoting the banking and tourism sectors and pursuing trade deals with Arab neighbors and the United States. He initially sought to balance relations with the West and the Arab states, but sectarian divides increased during his rule, and he concentrated power around the presidency. He attempted to seek an unconstitutional second term, which culminated in the 1958 Lebanon crisis between Chamoun's supporters and Muslim-dominated Nasserites, during which Chamoun attained American military intervention. American mediation ended the crisis, with Chamoun finishing his term and being succeeded by General Fouad Chehab.

Chamoun remained politically active following the end of his presidency, forming the National Liberal Party, and continuing to serve in parliament and several future cabinets. During the Lebanese Civil War, he was one of the country's main Christian leaders, helping to create and lead the Lebanese Front. He initially supported the Syrian occupation of Lebanon but later switched to endorsing a tactical alliance with Israel instead. During the war, he survived several assassination attempts, finally dying in Beirut of a heart attack in 1987. He founded a political dynasty, which includes his sons Dory and Dany, as well as his grandchildren Camille and Tracy.

== Early years and education ==
Camille Nimr Chamoun was born in Deir al-Qamar on 3 April 1900. He was the son of the civil servant Nimr Chamoun and Antoinette Adib, with the former hailing from a peasant family in Deir al-Qamar, while the latter was the younger sister of Auguste Adib Pacha, who served as Prime Minister of Lebanon during the French Mandate and was one of the creators of the modern Lebanese state. The Chamoun family was Maronite Christian and middle-class.

Chamoun was first educated at a Sisters of St. Joseph school, then at a Marist Brothers school, and then at the College of the Sacred Heart of the Brothers of the Christian Schools in Beirut. As all of the schools were run by French missionaries, they closed upon the beginning of World War I, and so Chamoun continued his studies at the Saint-Antoine school in Baabda.

Nimr Chamoun was, due to his pro-French sympathies, expelled to a village in Anatolia near Ankara in 1916 by the Ottoman government. In 1919, the Chamoun family was allowed to return to Lebanon. Chamoun briefly worked in the Ottoman Public Debt Administration, before being admitted to Saint Joseph University in 1920. In 1923, he graduated with a law degree. Chamounn worked at Lebanese National Library, but left in 1924 when he was admitted to the Beirut bar. He trained at the law firm of Émile Eddé, then proceeded to open his own practice. He also began contributing to the newspaper Le Reveil around this time, with law and journalism being his introduction to politics. Chamoun took on important clients and forged political connections with associates of his father and uncle.

== Career and activities ==
=== French Lebanon ===
In 1926, the Lebanese Republic was declared under the French Mandate. In 1929, Chamoun participated in the legislative elections, securing his first electoral victory. Chamoun was first elected to the Parliament of Lebanon in 1934, and was reelected in 1937 and 1943. Chamoun was a Lebanese nationalist and an opponent of continued French rule of Lebanon. In September of 1934, with fellow politician Bechara El Khoury and others, he helped found the Constitutional Bloc, which sought to establish constitutional rule and end the French Mandate.

Chamoun served as finance minister in the cabinet of Prime Minister Khaled Chehab from 21 March to 1 November 1938. In the 1943 parliamentary election, Chamoun was the only prominent Maronite leader to win in the first round. Also in 1943, the Maronite El Khoury and the Sunni politician Riad Al Solh forged the verbal agreement known as the National Pact, which balanced the power of Lebanon's Christians and Muslims. According to the pact, the parliament would have a 6:5 ratio of Christians to Muslims, and the president would be a Maronite, the prime minister a Sunni, and the speaker of parliament a Shia. The pact also mandated that Muslims not attempt to unify with other Arab states and the Christians would cooperate with said states and not ally with France.

In the 1943 presidential election, the two candidates were El Khoury and Eddé. When the latter realized that he would not win, he proposed Chamoun as a candidate to the British Levant envoy, Edward Spears. El Khoury accepted and briefly dropped out of the election, but the French, fearing Chamoun, then supported El Khoury. He won the election held on 21 September, became president, and then appointed his ally Al Solh to the post of prime minister. Chamoun was then made interior minister and minister of telegraph and post on 25 September in the Al Solh's cabinet.

As a result of the Lebanese government amending Lebanon's constitution to end the French Mandate, on 11 November, French authorities arrested Chamoun, President El Khoury, Prime Minister Al Solh, and other ministers. They were imprisoned in the castle of Rashayya for eleven days. Massive public protests and foreign pressure from Arab monarchs and the British led to their release on 22 November, while the French officially declared an end to the mandate. 22 November has since been celebrated as the Lebanese Independence Day.

=== Post-independence ===
Chamoun continued to serve in parliament after independence, and his term in Al Solh's cabinet ended on 3 July 1944. He left the post to become the country's first ambassador to the United Kingdom. In the post, he made the Lebanese embassy the location wherein Arab delegates discussed unfolding events in British Mandatory Palestine. He attended the International Conference on Civil Aviation in Chicago in November 1944, and represented Lebanon at the founding of UNESCO in November 1945 in London. He returned to Lebanon in 1946, and again served as the finance minister from 14 December 1946 to 7 June 1947 and then as minister of health until 26 July 1948, both under Al Solh.

Chamoun was the ambassador to the United Nations (UN) at the 1947 and 1948 sessions. At the 1947 session, he rejected the UN Partition Plan for Palestine, arguing that Palestinians should control the whole territory. Chamoun suffered a heart attack in January 1948 while defending the Palestinian cause at the UN. This led to him getting the nickname "The glorious young man of Arabism" (Arabic: فتى العروبة الأغر) and increased his reputation among the Arabs, Americans and British. Chamoun's diplomatic efforts increased his profile among Arab nationalists abroad and his time out of the country allowed him to distance himself from the corruption in El Khoury's administration.

=== "White revolution" and 1952 presidential election ===
Chamoun was re-elected to parliament in 1947. El Khoury, with the support of Al Solh, amended the constitution to allow for his reelection in 1948. In late May, following the amendment of the constitution, Chamoun joined the opposition. In early 1950, various opposition forces, including Chamoun, Kamal Jumblatt's Progressive Socialist Party, Raymond Eddé's National Bloc, Pierre Gemayel's Kataeb Party, the Najjadeh Party, the Syrian Social Nationalist Party in Lebanon, and the Lebanese Communist Party formed the Patriotic Socialist Front (PSF). Chamoun and Jumblatt were the leaders of the coalition.

Chamoun was reelected in 1951, but that election left the opposition with only eight seats. On 16 May 1952, the PSF adopted a left-wing program that called for, among other reforms, an independent judiciary and left-wing economic policy, and was signed by Chamoun. The PSF held a large rally in Chamoun's hometown on 17 August wherein Jumblatt called for the elimination of sectarian quotas for parliament. In September, the PSF announced a general strike to force El Khoury's resignation. Commander-in-chief of the Lebanese Armed Forces General Fouad Chehab refused to suppress the strike, so on 18 September El Khoury resigned. The ousting of El Khoury was described by supporters such as Jumblatt as a "white" or "glorious" revolution due to the lack of bloodshed and the mobilization of popular support.

Chehab headed the government in an interim capacity until a new election could be held on 23 September. In the election, the two frontrunners were Chamoun and the former foreign minister Hamid Frangieh. Chamoun had the support of a majority of Lebanon's Muslim deputies, the British, Syrian leader Adib Shishakli, and Iraqi prime minister Nuri al-Said, while Frangieh was supported by the French and many Christian deputies. Frangieh dropped out of the race when Ahmed Abdel Latif Asaad indicated that his 16-member parliamentary bloc would support Chamoun. In a single round of voting, Chamoun won with 74 votes, with one opposing vote going to Abdullah El-Haj, one vote being blank, and one deputy being absent.

== Presidency ==
=== Administration ===
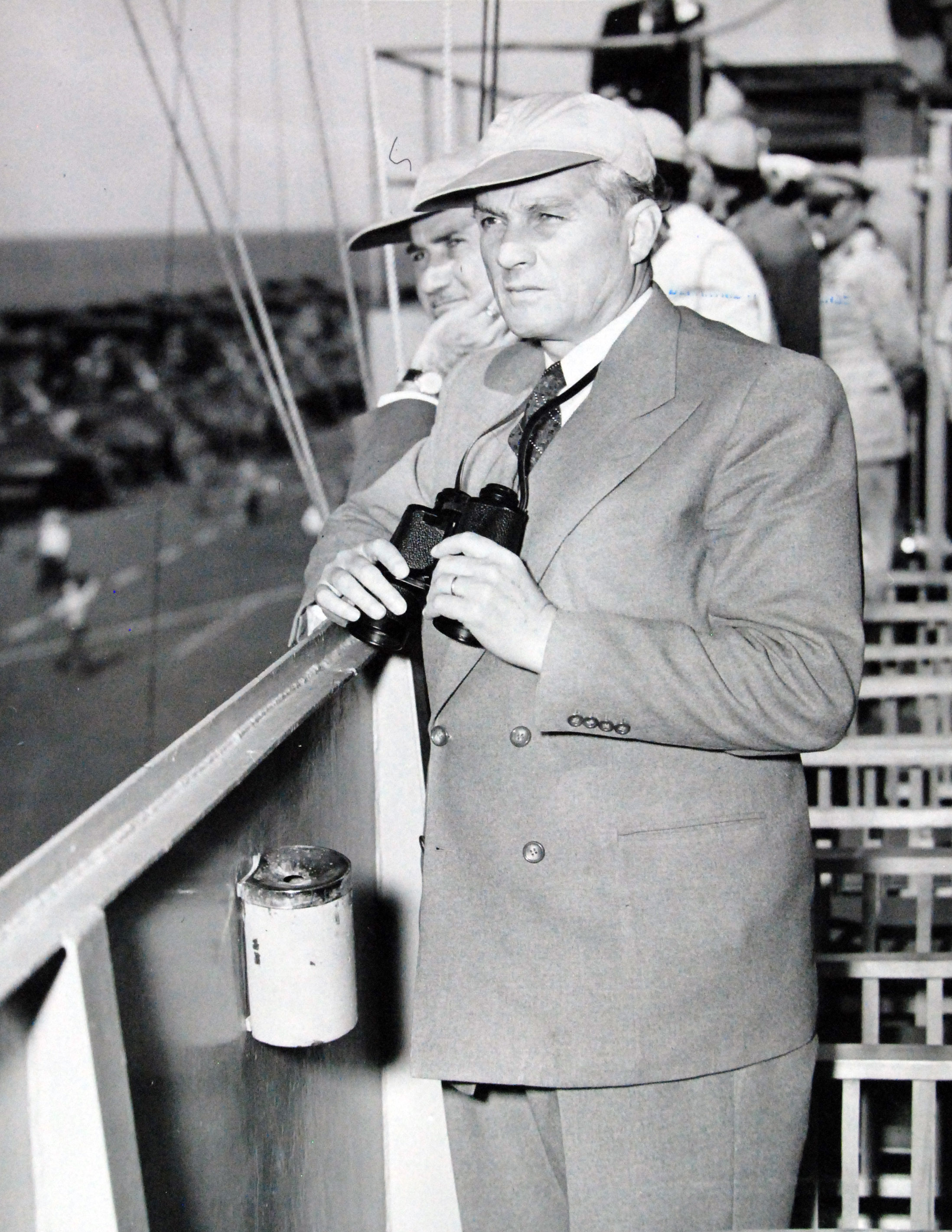
Chamoun aboard the USS Franklin D. Roosevelt, 1953

Chamoun became president on 23 September 1952, the same day as the election. In his inaugural speech, Chamoun signaled his desire to implement reform, but was hesitant to include PSF members in a cabinet and quickly broke with Jumblatt, who became a critic of Chamoun. Chamoun was unsuccessful in forming a national unity government due to divides between reformists and traditionalists in parliament. On 30 September, Chamoun named Khaled Chehab as prime minister, who served until 30 April 1953. The cabinet consisted of four non-parliamentarians.

Chehab was succeeded by Saeb Salam, who served until 16 August 1953. Salam was succeeded by Abdallah El-Yafi, who served until 16 September 1954. Sami Solh, a cousin of Riad Al Solh, succeeded El-Yafi, serving until 19 September 1955, when he was replaced by Rashid Karami, who was prime minister until 19 March 1956. Afterwards, El-Yafi served as prime minister again until 18 November. Afterwards, Solh again assumed the premiership, serving until 24 September 1958. A total of 13 cabinets were formed during Chamoun's presidency, with an average lifespan of six to eight months. According to Fawwaz Traboulsi, Chamoun concentrated power into his hands, blurring the limits of democracy and autocracy.

=== Domestic policy ===
Chamoun set out to implement governmental reforms. On 6 November 1952, the government published a new electoral law that allowed some women to vote, implemented compulsory voting, reduced the size of electoral districts to single-member constituencies, but reduced the number of parliamentary seats from 77 to 44. On 15 February 1953, Chamoun's administration announced the implementation of universal women's suffrage, removing a previous literacy requirement. The government also relaxed press censorship imposed by El Khoury's administration, and created a Higher Judicial Council whose goal, according to Chamoun, was to give the country an independent judiciary.

During Chamoun's presidency, Lebanon experienced an economic boom, in particular in the construction, banking and tourism sectors. He implemented a 1954 law on the creation of joint-stock companies and a 1956 law on banking secrecy. Chamoun personally promoted the growing tourism industry in Lebanon, and in particular encouraged the creation of the Baalbeck International Festival. In 1957, Chamoun and Prime Minister Sami Solh placed the cornerstone of the first television station in Lebanon and the Middle East, belonging to Télé Liban.

=== Foreign policy ===
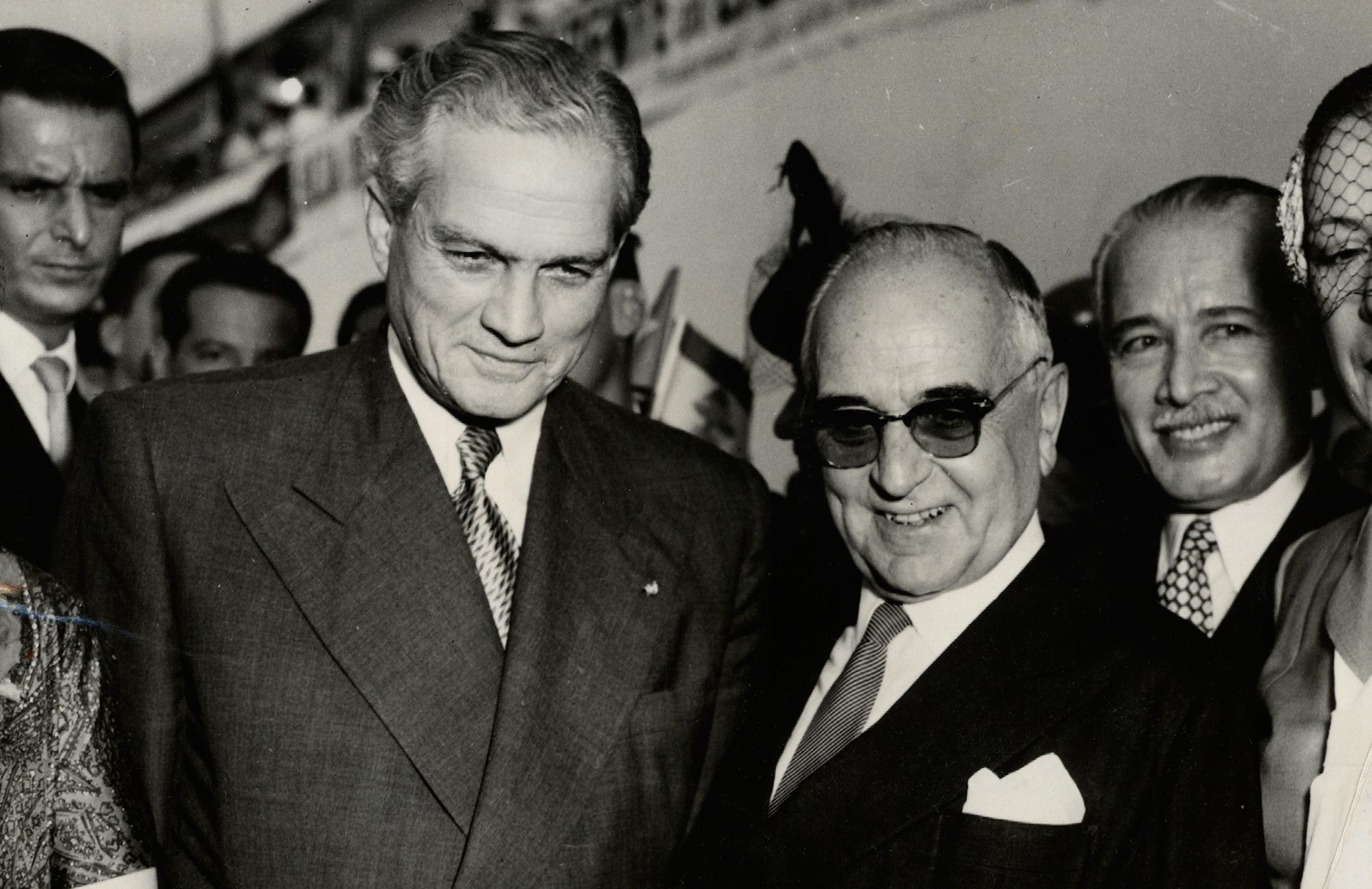
Chamoun with Brazilian president Getúlio Vargas in Brazil, 1954

Chamoun's first foreign visits during his term were to Egypt and other Arab states, whose markets for Lebanese products increased along with their oil wealth. In 1953, he signed a trade agreement with Egypt, Iraq, Jordan, and Syria. Chamoun's administration titled Lebanon towards the United States, and he sought to avoid involvement in the rivalries of the larger Arab states. In April 1955, Chamoun visited Turkey, and in June Turkish President Celâl Bayar visited Lebanon.

In 1953, Chamoun's government received $6 million in arms and economic aid from the United States. In 1954, Chamoun allowed the U.S. Air Force to use Lebanese airspace for reconnaissance missions. In 1955, Chamoun signed a long-desired trade deal wih the United States that was favorable to Lebanon.

In 1954, Chamoun visited Brazil, where there is a large Lebanese diaspora, and met President Getúlio Vargas. This made Chamoun the first head of state from the Middle East to visit South America. He subsequently visited Uruguay and Argentina, which also have notable Lebanese communities.

Lebanon did not officially join the anti-communist Baghdad Pact, but he did support it, and subsequently refused to join a defense pact signed in 1955 between Egypt, Saudi Arabia, and Syria in response to the Baghdad Pact.

=== Crisis of 1958 ===
Universal Newsreel about Middle East developments in 1958, including a meeting between Chamoun and Robert Daniel Murphy

Near the end of his term, Pan-Arabists and other groups backed by Gamal Abdel Nasser, with considerable support in Lebanon's Muslim (particularly Sunni) community attempted to overthrow Chamoun's government in June 1958 after Chamoun tried to seek another term as president against the constitution. The mood may have been itself indicative of the fact that nine prime ministers formed cabinets under the six years of Chamoun's presidency since Sunni politicians were not always able to justify their association with his politics to their constituencies and popular power base. That fact was evident in the pressures that faced the El-Bizri political base in Sidon, and the longstanding parliamentarian Nazih El-Bizri served as a cabinet minister during Chamoun's term. Facing unrest in the country, with its epicentre in Sidon at the start of the protests, Chamoun eventually appealed to the United States for help under the new Eisenhower Doctrine, and American Marines landed in Beirut. Moreover, Naim Moghabghab, a close friend and political ally, formed and led a military group to reinforce Chamoun's position. Many battles occurred, mainly in Beirut and in the Chouf district, where clashes between Naim Moghabghab and Kamal Jumblatt's men led to bloody fights. The revolt was squashed, but to appease Muslim anger, General Fouad Chehab, who claimed to be a Christian enjoying considerable popularity in the Muslim community, was elected to succeed Chamoun. The American diplomat Robert D. Murphy, who had been sent to Lebanon as personal representative of US President Dwight Eisenhower, played a significant role in allowing Chamoun to finish his term normally and Chehab to be elected according to the constitutional procedures.

== Post-presidency ==
On his retirement from the presidency, Chamoun founded the National Liberal Party (al-Ahrar). As its leader, Chamoun was elected to the National Assembly again in 1960, much to the consternation of Chehab. He was defeated in 1964 because of changes to the boundaries of his electoral district, which he and his supporters protested as deliberate gerrymandering. He was re-elected to the National Assembly, however, in 1968, and again in 1972, Lebanon's last parliamentary election in his lifetime. After the election of 1968, the National Liberal Party held 11 seats out of 99, becoming the largest single party in the notoriously fractured National Assembly. It was the only political party to elect representatives from all of Lebanon's major religious confessions.

=== Civil War ===
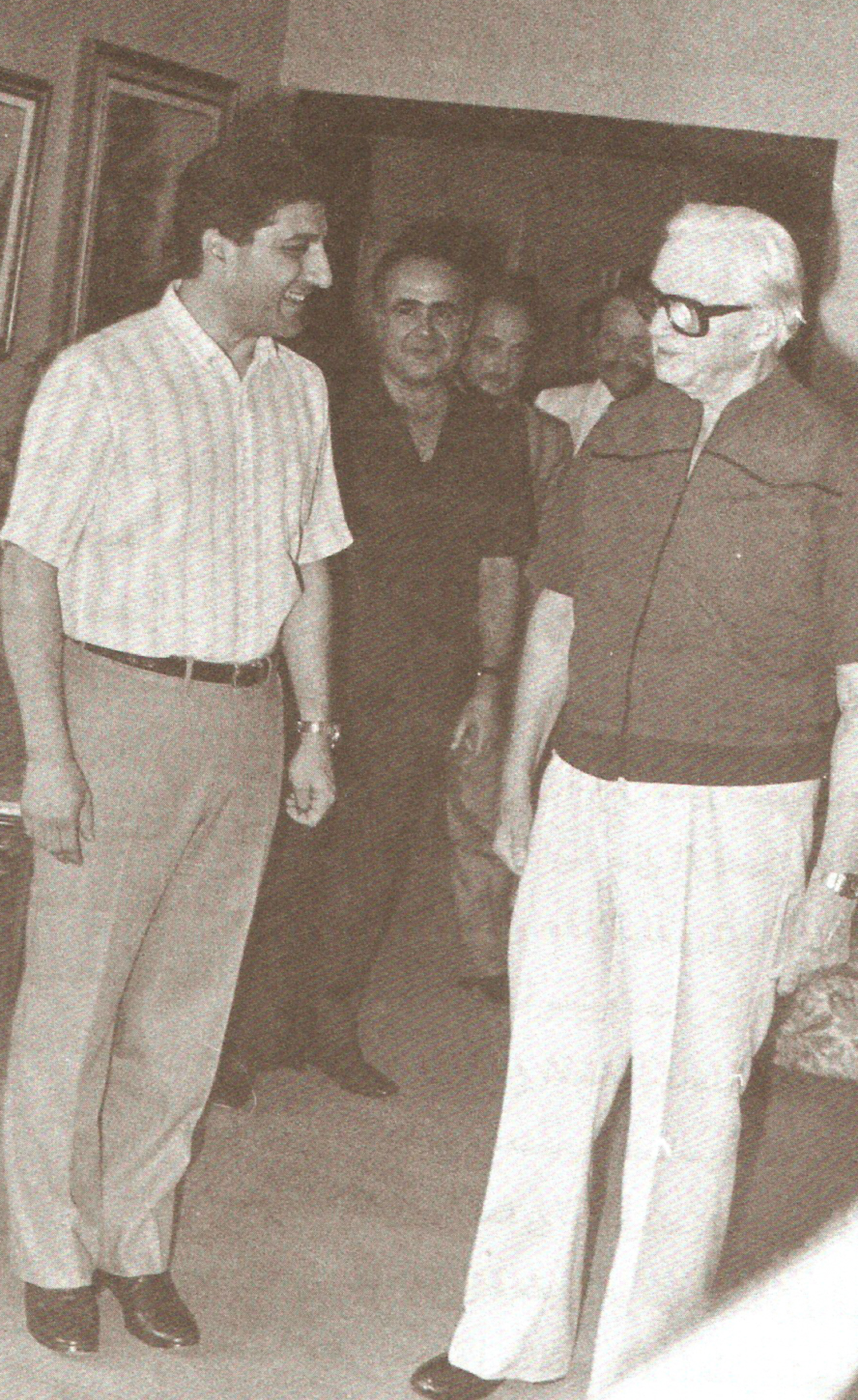
An elderly Chamoun with Bachir Gemayel during the Lebanese Civil War

In the 1970s and 1980s, Chamoun served in a variety of portfolios in the cabinet, including interior minister. That was during the Lebanese Civil War (1975–1990), in which Chamoun and his party participated through the party's militia, the Tigers (in Arabic, nimr means tiger). In the early stages of the war, he helped found the Lebanese Front, a coalition of mostly-Christian politicians and parties, whose united militia, dominated by the Kataeb Party, became known as the Lebanese Forces (LF). Chamoun was chairman of the Lebanese Front from 1976 to 1978. He was defense minister in the cabinet of Rashid Karami in 1976.

In a 1976 diplomatic cable from Beirut, special US envoy L. Dean Brown stated, "If I got nothing else from my meeting with Frangieh, Chamoun and Gemayel, it is their clear, unequivocal and unmistakable belief that their principal hope for saving Christian necks is Syria. They sound like Assad is the latest incarnation of the Crusaders."

Though initially aligned with Syria and inviting the Syrian Army to intervene against the leftist Lebanese National Movement (LNM) and its Palestinian allies in 1976, Chamoun later gravitated towards opposition to the Syrians' presence.

On 12 March 1980, In Dora, Mount Lebanon, a remote-controlled bomb exploded near the car of Camille Chamoun. One bodyguard was killed while Chamoun, his driver, another bodyguard and a passerby suffered minor injuries.

In 1980, the NLP's Tigers militia was virtually destroyed by a surprise attack from Chamoun's Christian rival, Bachir Gemayel. After Israel's invasion of Lebanon, Chamoun decided to enter a tactical cooperation with Israel to oppose the Syrian occupation in Lebanon.

Gemayel was elected to the presidency in August 1982, but was assassinated before taking office. Chamoun announced his candidacy, but withdrew one day before the election, after the United States endorsed Amine Gemayel. Chamoun declared his withdrawal by saying: "O Lebanese, it is no coincidence that behind my withdrawal lies the one who will impose a unilateral peace [meaning Israel] on the one who fills the presidential seat." Chamoun at the same time publicly supported the formation of an official security accord between Israel and Lebanon, framing it as a necessary mechanism to stabilize the southern border and guarantee Lebanese sovereignty against regional adversaries.

In early 1984, Chamoun provided political backing to Lebanese Armed Forces Major General Antoine Lahad, a close associate, to assume command of the South Lebanon Army (SLA) southern militia operating from its military headquarters in Marjayoun. Chamoun's high-level backing protected Lahad's leadership against encroachment from rival northern factions like the Phalangists and the Lebanese Forces, as Lahad expanded the militia into a multi-sectarian force that included Lebanese Christian, Muslim, and Druze forces.

In 1985, 5 people were killed and 23 injured in a suicide attack during a meeting between Christian parties in the St. Georges Monastery in Beirut which was aimed at the five main leaders of the Christian factions of the war. A Christian group called "the Vanguard of Arab Christians" was named as responsible for the attack. Another assassination attempt occurred again on 7 January 1987 which killed 6 people and wounded 40 others when 165 pounds of explosives was detonated as Chamoun passed through East Beirut in the morning.

== Corruption allegations ==
According to As'ad AbuKhalil, an American document from 1975 revealed that when Chamoun, as Interior Minister, used to import glass, he asked the Tigers militia to "ignite the fronts" to secure glass deals.

== Personal life ==
In 1930 he married Zelpha (or Zalfa) Tabet, a Protestant of maternal English ancestry from a wealthy political family. They had two sons, Dany and Dory, both of whom became politicians in the NLP. Dany, his second wife and two sons were all shot dead in their Beirut apartment on 21 October 1990.

In 1984 Chamoun agreed to join the National Unity government as deputy prime minister, which he held until his death on 7 August 1987, at the age of 87.

== Death ==
He died of a heart attack at Saint George's Hospital in Beirut. He spent his last months mostly in the care of his protégée Aida Yahchouchi and her husband, Joseph Wehbe. He is remembered as one of the main Christian nationalist leaders and one of the last significant figures of Lebanon's prewar generation of politicians whose political influence was eclipsed during the war by that of younger militia commanders.

== Legacy ==
The early years of Chamoun's presidency has been viewed as a "golden age" in Lebanon's history due to its economic success and press freedom. However, by the time of the 1958 crisis, he was increasingly unpopular. Traboulsi criticized Chamoun's presidency as authoritarian and exacerbating sectarian divides in Lebanon. The academic Adnan Iskander argued that Chamoun was willing to reform Lebanese politics, but in ways that were "superficial and unsuccessful and did not result in overall significant changes". Thomas Collelo described Chamoun as "perhaps the most charismatic of all [of Lebanon's] Christian leaders". The Camille Chamoun Sports City Stadium in Beirut is named in Chamoun's honor.

== See also ==
- Chamoun family

Political offices
Preceded by Fouad Chehab; Acting	President of Lebanon; 1952–1958	Succeeded by Fouad Chehab
