= Maronite politics =

Form of political sectarian nationalism

Maronite politics (Arabic: المارونية السياسية), also translated as political Maronism, is a form of identity politics used in Lebanon that refers to sectarian ideals of Maronite politicians, as well as the period where Maronites were the main political actors in negotiations with France for political autonomy.

In 1920, Maronites played a key role in the establishment of Greater Lebanon by the French Mandate. They were the largest sect at the time, and were appointed to the main political offices; the President, the Prime Minister and the Speaker. The National Pact of 1943 dedicated their right to hold the presidency.

Maronites are usually associated with Phoenicianism and Lebanese nationalism, which are ideologies that reject the Arab identity of Lebanon and the Lebanese people, claiming that they are descended from Phoenicians, an ancient civilization that lived on the coast of the Eastern Mediterranean.

== Major parties ==
Party		Leader	Alliance	Notes
Lebanese Forces القوات اللبنانية al-Quwwāt al-Lubnānīyah	LF	Samir Geagea	March 14	The Lebanese Forces is a Christian-based political party and former militia during the Lebanese Civil War. It currently holds 19 of the 128 seats in Lebanon's parliament and is therefore the largest party in parliament. It was a major Christian player during the civil war while it controlled its own Maronite canton (Marounistan) north of the country.
Free Patriotic Movement التيار الوطني الحرّ at-Tayyār al-Waṭanī al-Horr	FPM	Gebran Bassil	March 8	The Free Patriotic Movement is Maronite-based political party which follows the agenda of former president Michel Aoun. It currently holds 17 seats of the 128 seats in Lebanon's parliament. The party has large support in Christian districts like Batroun and Jezzine.
Kataeb Party (Phalanges) حزب الكتائب اللبنانية Ḥizb al-Katā'ib al-Lubnānīya	Kataeb	Samy Gemayel	March 14	The Phalange Party is a Christian-based political party of Maronite majority and former militia. it currently holds 4 of the 128 seats in parliament, all of which are Maronite Christian. As a militia, it played a pivotal role during the Lebanese Civil War as it controlled its own Maronite canton (Marounistan) as part of the Lebanese Front. The party is also led by the Gemayel family, a notable Maronite family based in the regions of Achrafieh and Metn which carries the legacy of Pierre and Bashir Gemayel.
Marada Movement تيار المردة Tayyār al-Marada	MM	Suleiman Frangieh	March 8	The Marada Movement is a former militia active during the Lebanese Civil War named after the legendary Marada (also called Mardaites) warriors of the early Middle Ages that fought on the external edge of the Byzantine Empire. The party holds 2 of the 128 seats in parliament and is popular in the districts of Zgharta and Koura. The party was founded and led by the Frangieh family who claim descendance from the Franks.
National Liberal Party حزب الوطنيين الأحرار Ḥizb al-Waṭaniyyīn al-Aḥrār	NLP	Camille Dory Chamoun	March 14	The NLP is a party that is Maronite-based led by the Chamoun family. It currently holds 1 seat of the 128 seats in Lebanon's parliament. The party has large amounts of support from Christians in Chouf and Baabda.
Independence Movement حركة الاستقلال Harakat Al-Istiklal	IM	Michel Moawad	March 14	The Independence Movement is a sovereigntist, reformist and secular centre-right political party based in Zgharta, Lebanon, founded in 2006 by Michel René Moawad, son of the assassinated Lebanese President President René Moawad and first lady Nayla Moawad; a former Member of the Lebanese Parliament. It held 3 seats in the 2005 Lebanese general election, and currently holds 1 seat in the Lebanese Parliament.
