= Dany Chamoun =

Lebanese politician (1934–1990)

- داني شمعون
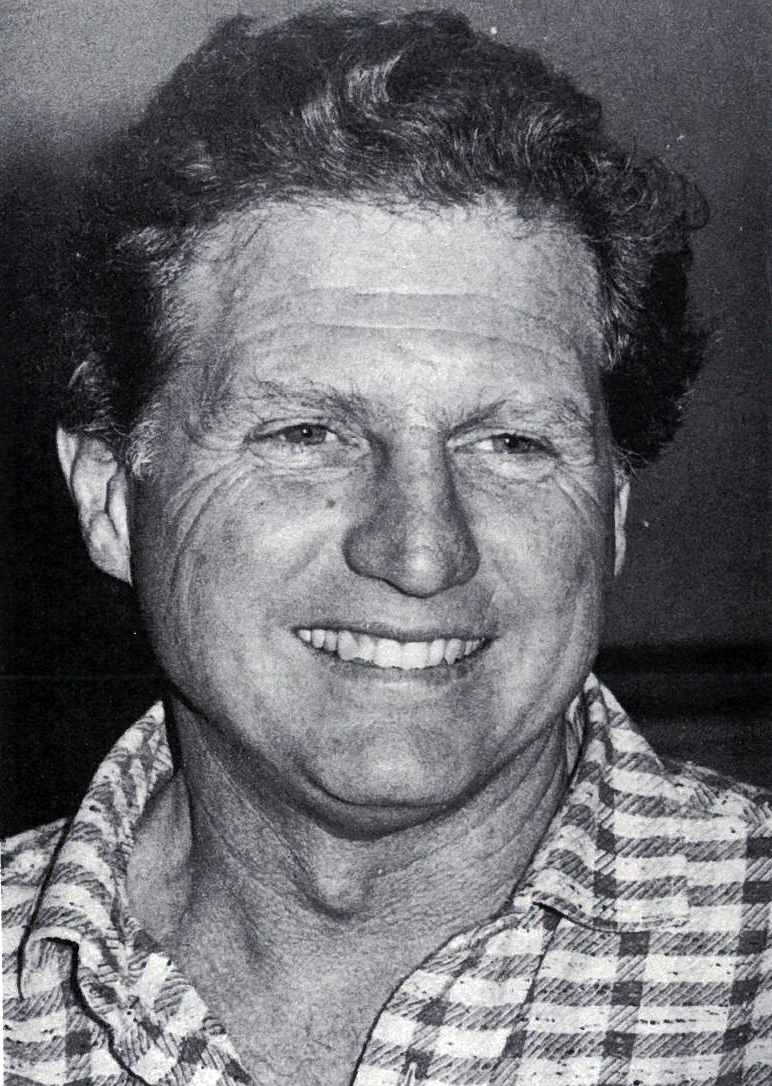
- Dany Chamoun in 1988

President of the National Liberal Party
- In office 1985–1990
- Preceded by: Camille Chamoun
- Succeeded by: Dory Chamoun

Personal details
- Born: 26 August 1934 Deir el Qamar, Lebanon
- Died: 21 October 1990 (aged 56) Beirut, Lebanon
- Cause of death: Assassination by firearm
- Party: National Liberal Party
- Children: 4 (including Tracy Chamoun)
- Parent: Camille Chamoun (father)
- Relatives: Dory Chamoun (brother); Camille Dory Chamoun (nephew)

Dany Chamoun (Arabic: داني شمعون, romanized: Dānī Shamʿūn; 26 August 1934 – 21 October 1990) was a prominent Lebanese politician. A Maronite Christian, the younger son of former President Camille Chamoun and brother of Dory Chamoun, Chamoun was also a politician in his own right. He was murdered on October 21, 1990 at age 56, along with his family.

== Early life and education ==
Dany Chamoun was born in Deir el-Qamar on 26 August 1934. He was the younger son of former Lebanese President Camille Chamoun. He studied civil engineering in the United Kingdom at Loughborough University.

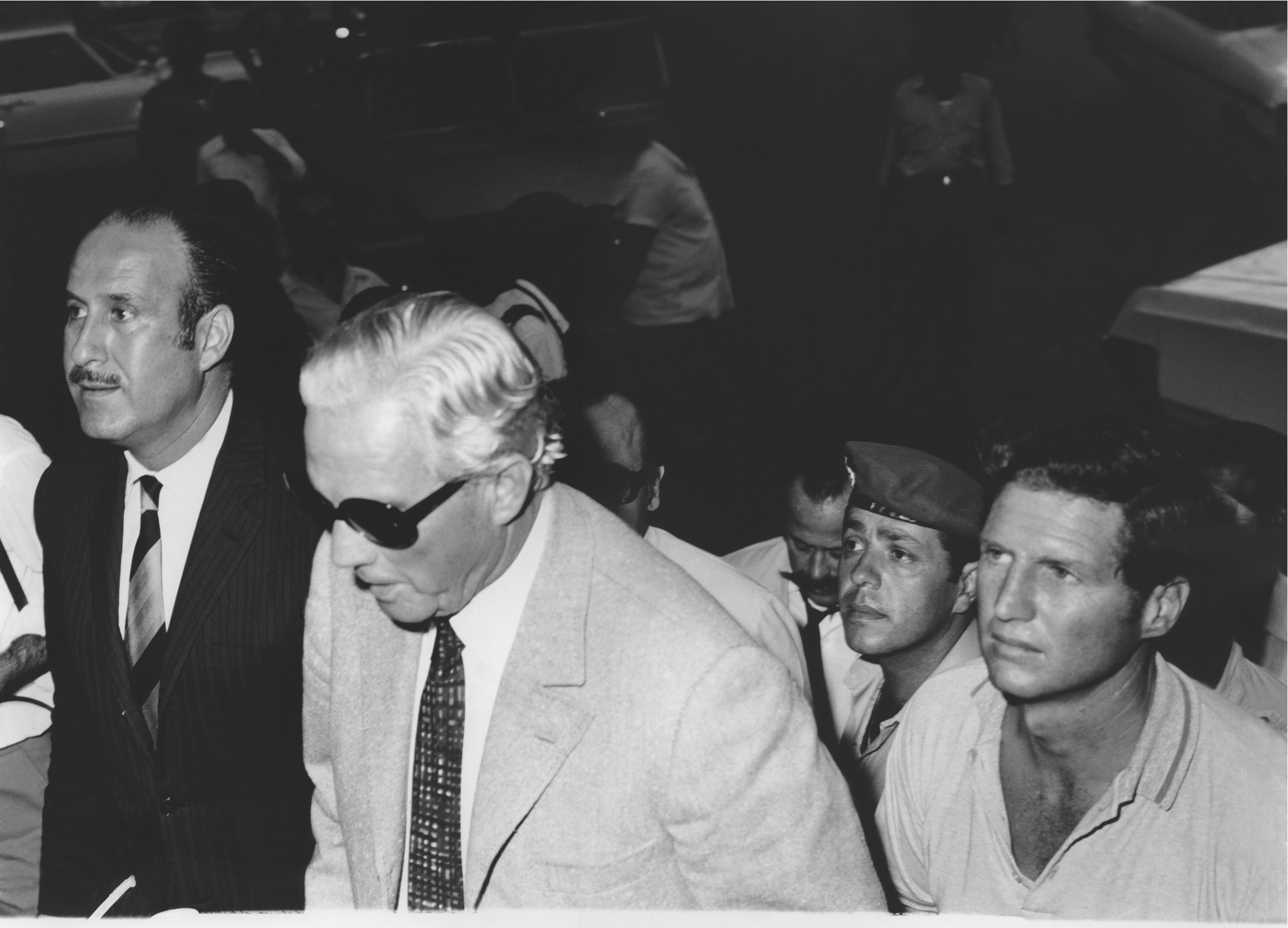
Young Dany Chamoun (right) with his father Camille (middle) and Michel Sassine (left)

== Political career ==
Chamoun reported that he had not had any interest in politics before the Lebanese Civil War. He became the National Liberal Party Secretary of Defense in January 1976, after the death of his predecessor Naim Berdkan. As Supreme Commander of the NLP's military wing, the Tigers, he also played a major role in the early years of the Lebanese Civil War.

By 1980, the Phalangist-dominated Lebanese Forces were under the command of Bachir Gemayel. The Tigers were eliminated as a military force in a surprise attack by Gemayel’s militia on 7 July 1980.

Chamoun's life was spared, and he fled to the Sunni Muslim-dominated West Beirut. He then went into self-imposed exile.

He served as General Secretary of the National Liberal Party from 1983 to 1985, when he replaced his father as the party leader. In 1988, he became President of the revived Lebanese Front—a coalition of nationalist and mainly Christian parties and politicians that his father had helped to found. The same year, he announced his candidacy for the Presidency of Lebanon to succeed Amine Gemayel (Bashir's brother), but Syria (which by this time occupied some 70 percent of Lebanese territory) vetoed his candidacy.

Gemayel's term expired on 23 September 1988 without the election of a successor. Chamoun declared his strong support for Michel Aoun, who had been appointed by the outgoing president to lead an interim administration and went on to lead one of two rival governments that contended for power over the next two years. He strongly opposed the Taif Agreement, which not only gave a greater share of power to the Muslim community than they had enjoyed previously, but more seriously, in Chamoun's opinion, formalized what he saw as the master-servant relationship between Syria and Lebanon, and refused to recognize the new government of the President Elias Hrawi, who was elected under the Taif Agreement.

=== War period ===
On January 18, 1976 Dany Chamoun was one of the militia commanders who participated in the Karantina Massacre. After the massacre, Dany Chamoun conducted an interview in which he denied that it was a massacre, instead referring to it as a "concise military operation" aimed at reclaiming private property.

On June 28, 1976 Dany Chamoun led the attack on Tal el-Zaatar Palestinian camp which resulted in a significant loss of life and displacement of Palestinian refugees. Dany Chamoun and Bachir Gemayel claimed that they didn't destroy the entire camp out of concern for the lives of civilians.

== Death ==
On 21 October 1990, Chamoun, his second wife Ingrid Abdelnour (aged 45), and their two sons, Tarek (aged 7) and Julian (aged 5), were all shot dead in their apartment.

Chamoun was survived by his two daughters Tracy (through his first wife Patti Morgan) and Tamara, eleven months old at the time of the massacre. Chamoun's eldest daughter, Tracy had been overseas at the time of the massacre while his youngest daughter, Tamara survived.

=== Aftermath and trials ===
On 24 June 1995, the Lebanese Tribunal found Christian rival Samir Geagea guilty of the murder of Dany Chamoun and his family. He was sentenced to death commuted to life in prison with hard labour. Co-defendants Camille Karam and Rafic Saadeh were sentenced to ten and one year respectively. Ten other members of the Lebanese Forces were sentenced to life in absentia. The case was based entirely on circumstantial evidence and the trial was described by Amnesty International as seriously flawed. Geagea remained on trial for the Saydet al-Najat Church bombing. The verdict was rejected by a part of the Lebanese public opinion and by Dany's brother, Dory Chamoun, who declared that the Syrian occupation army was responsible for the massacre. Geagea was released on 18 July 2005 when the 14 March Alliance-controlled Lebanese Parliament voted an amnesty bill. This is despite the amnesty bill nominally excluding the release of convicts of "crimes of assassination or attempted assassination of religious figures, political leaders and foreign or Arab diplomats".

== See also ==
- List of assassinated Lebanese politicians
- List of extrajudicial killings and political violence in Lebanon
- List of attacks in Lebanon
- Tracy Chamoun
