= Dory Chamoun =

Lebanese politician (1931–2026)

- دوري شمعون
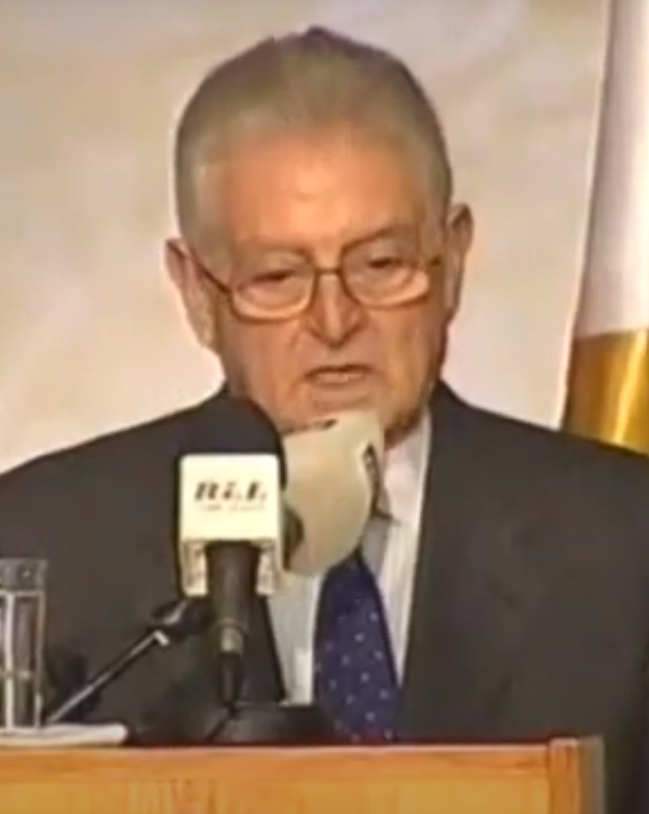

Member of the parliament of Lebanon
- In office 8 June 2009 – 22 May 2018
- Constituency: Chouf

President of the National Liberal Party
- In office 25 May 1991 – 10 April 2021
- Vice President: Robert Khoury
- Preceded by: Dany Chamoun
- Succeeded by: Camille Dory Chamoun

Personal details
- Born: 8 November 1931 Deir el Qamar, Lebanon
- Died: 14 September 2026 (aged 94)
- Party: National Liberal Party
- Spouse: Nayla Gabriel Tabet (died 2013)
- Children: Camille Dory Chamoun
- Parent: Camille Chamoun (father)
- Relatives: Dany Chamoun (brother); Tracy Chamoun (niece); Jackie Chamoun (grand daughter)

Dory Chamoun (Arabic: دوري شمعون, romanized: Dūrī Shamʿūn; 8 November 1931 – 14 September 2026) was a Lebanese politician who led the National Liberal Party (NLP) from 25 May 1991 until 10 April 2021, when he was succeeded by his son Camille Dory Chamoun who became an MP in the 2022 Lebanese general election. He was also a prominent member of the Qornet Shehwan Gathering, a coalition of politicians, academics, and businessmen who oppose the pro-Syrian March 8 Alliance and Syrian influence in Lebanon. He was the eldest son of Lebanese president Camille Chamoun and brother of Dany Chamoun.

== Early life ==
Dory Chamoun was the elder son of Camille Chamoun (1900–1987), who was President of Lebanon from 1952 to 1958. An industrialist by profession, he initially showed much less interest in politics than his younger brother, Dany Chamoun. During the Lebanese Civil War, Dory briefly replaced his brother Dany as commander of the NLP's military wing, the Tigers Militia, between July–August 1980, prior to its disbandment by order of their father following the Safra massacre perpetrated by the Lebanese Forces (LF) led by Bachir Gemayel, which eliminated the backbone of the NLP militia and incorporated the rest into the LF structure.

== Political career ==
After Dany was assassinated in October 1990, in what is qualified as an "unfair trial" by several organizations such as Amnesty International, Samir Geagea, the Christian leader of the Lebanese Forces, was subsequently tried for the murder. The fairness of the trial was challenged by Dory who declared publicly on 25 April 2005 that he believed Geagea to be innocent and demanded a new investigation to uncover the real assassins, whom he suspected of being Syrian agents. Nevertheless, he agreed to take over the leadership of the National Liberal Party, which his father had founded in 1958 and which Dany was leading at the time of his death. He subsequently travelled extensively, visiting Lebanese communities in France, Canada, Australia, New Zealand, and the United States, encouraging them to oppose the Syrian military occupation of Lebanon. He is known to have been wary of foreign support; he stated publicly that he did not trust Israel, which he accused of "abandoning" Lebanese Christians at a time when they depended on Israeli aid, and frequently expressed doubts about the sincerity of U.S. and French demands for a withdrawal of Syrian forces from Lebanon. He expressed deep disappointment that countries to which the Lebanese opposition has looked for support have not, in his opinion, lived up to their expectations.

Chamoun led the National Liberal Party in its boycott of the last three parliamentary elections (1992, 1996, and 2000), which he claimed were gerrymandered and rigged to produce a pro-Syrian majority. Following the assassination of former Prime Minister Rafik Hariri on 14 February 2005, he became a prominent participant in the Cedar Revolution protests that have swept Beirut, calling for the total withdrawal of all Syrian troops from Lebanese territory, the resignation of the pro-Syrian government, and the holding of free and fair parliamentary and presidential elections.

His political boycott did not extend to municipal politics. He himself served as Mayor of the Deir el-Qamar municipality from 2004 until his election to the parliament seat for the Chouf in 2009.

On 27 January 2006, Dory Chamoun announced his candidacy for the vacated Maronite seat in Lebanon's Baabda-Aley by-election alongside reporter May Chidiac who was also running for the same post. However, the seat went to Pierre Daccache, whom most of Lebanon's Christian parties accepted as a consensus candidate.

On 8 June 2009, Chamoun was elected member of parliament for the Maronite seat in the Shouf area.

== Personal life and death ==
On 2 November 2012, Chamoun suffered a heart attack. He was transferred to St.Charles Hospital at Fiyadieh whereby he underwent an angioplasty surgery.

On 5 March 2013, Dory Chamoun's wife Nayla Gabriel Tabet died. She was 78. His eldest son, Camille Dory, is also politically active and was an unsuccessful parliamentary candidate in the general election held in May and June 2005. He is currently an MP after succeeding in the 2022 Lebanese general election.

Chamoun died on 14 September 2026, at the age of 94. In a statement, the National Liberal Party described him as “a man of unwavering principles and courageous positions” and long political career was tied to the party and the “sovereign cause.”

== See also ==
- Cedar Revolution
- National Liberal Party
- Tigers Militia
- Lebanese Civil War

== Bibliography ==
- Afaf Sabeh McGowan, John Roberts, As'ad Abu Khalil, and Robert Scott Mason, Lebanon: a country study, area handbook series, Headquarters, Department of the Army (DA Pam 550-24), Washington D.C. 1989. -
- Alain Menargues, Les Secrets de la guerre du Liban: Du coup d'état de Béchir Gémayel aux massacres des camps palestiniens, Albin Michel, Paris 2004. ISBN 978-2226121271 (in French)
- Claire Hoy and Victor Ostrovsky, By Way of Deception: The Making and Unmaking of a Mossad Officer, St. Martin's Press, New York 1990. ISBN 0-9717595-0-2
- David Gilmour, Palestine: The Fractured Country, Sphere Books, 1984 (2nd edition, 1987). ISBN 978-0747400745, 0747400741
- Edgar O'Ballance, Civil War in Lebanon, 1975-92, Palgrave Macmillan, London 1998. ISBN 0-333-72975-7
- Matthew S. Gordon, The Gemayels (World Leaders Past & Present), Chelsea House Publishers, 1988. ISBN 978-1-55546-834-7
- Samuel M. Katz, Lee E. Russel, and Ron Volstad, Armies in Lebanon 1982-84, Men-at-arms series 165, Osprey Publishing Ltd, London 1985. ISBN 0-85045-602-9
- Tom Najem and Roy C. Amore, Historical Dictionary of Lebanon, Second Edition, Historical Dictionaries of Asia, Oceania, and the Middle East, Rowman & Littlefield Publishers, Lanham, Boulder, New York & London 2021. ISBN 9781538120439, 1538120437
