= Mk III helmet =

British combat helmet

MK III helmet
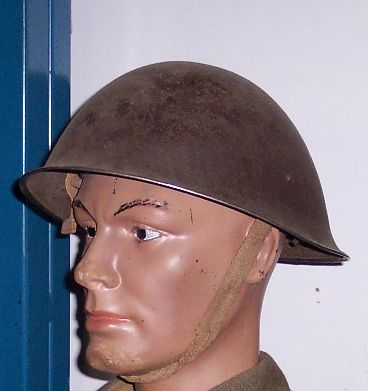
- MK III "Turtle" helmet
- Type: Combat Helmet
- Place of origin: United Kingdom

Service history
- In service: 1944 - 1980s
- Used by: See Users
- Wars: World War II

Production history
- Designer: Medical Research Council
- Designed: 1941
- Manufacturer: Briggs Motor Bodies Ltd; Fisher & Ludlow Ltd; Rubery Owen Co. Ltd
- Produced: 1943 – 1945
- No. produced: 500,000

Specifications
- Weight: 1.2 kg.

The Mk III Helmet, also known as the "turtle" helmet or M44, is a British steel combat helmet that was first developed for the British Army in 1941 by the Medical Research Council. It was issued to troops in April 1944 and then worn in combat for the first time by British and Canadian troops on D-Day. Mk III helmets were used alongside the Mkll helmet for the remainder of the Second World War, with the former's successor, the Mk IV, serving with the Army well into the late 1980s.

== Design ==
The Mark III helmet was designed to provide better protection for the side of the head than its predecessor. It was a deeper helmet with a smaller brim and provided 38% more protection than the Mark II, particularly at the sides (total area of head protection was increased by 12%, horizontal protection was increased by 15% and from items falling from overhead by 11%). The Mark III helmet was issued primarily to assault troops for the Normandy invasion in June 1944, and a large number of helmets from British stocks were issued to the 3rd Canadian Infantry Division in addition to British units. Small numbers also went to the 2nd and 4th Canadian Divisions. All Mark III helmets in Canadian stores were returned to the UK shortly after the end of World War II.

The Mk III gradually replaced the Mkll helmet from 1944 onwards. The Mk III was itself replaced after the war by the Mark IV helmet, which it closely resembled. The differences were that the rivets attaching the chinstrap to the helmet were placed much lower down on the shell and the use of a "lift-the-dot" fastener for the liner. These modifications allowed the Mk IV to be utilised for carrying water. In 1959 a new, more padded, liner was introduced into service but the steel helmet body was unchanged. Hence, the title of the helmet (at least in British army stores catalogues) remained the MK IV. In 1985 the nylon fiber Mark 6 helmet was introduced into service to replace the MK IV, although it was some years before the issue was universal.

== Production ==
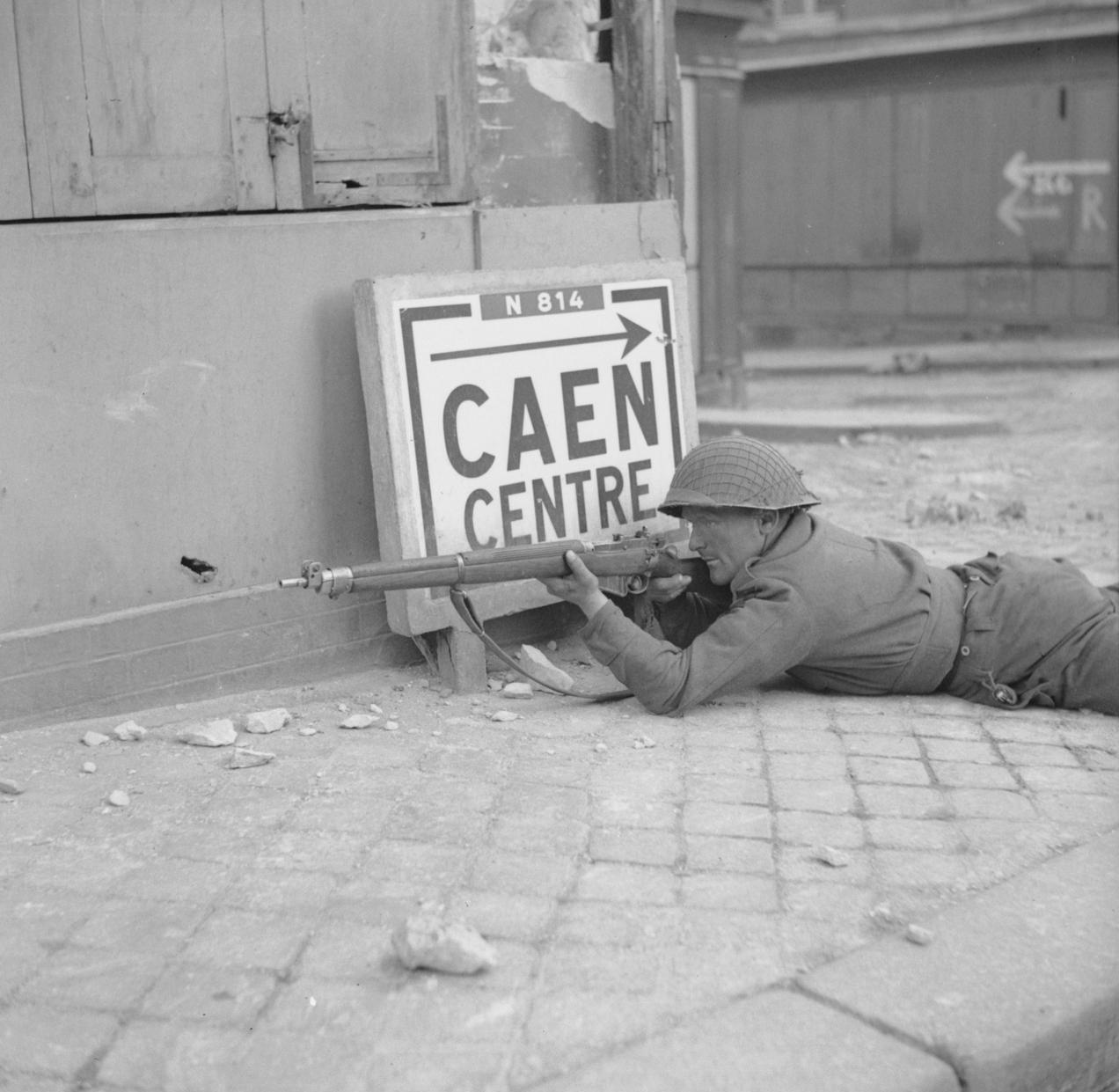
A British soldier wearing a Mark III helmet during the Normandy Campaign in 1944

Although designed in 1941, due to production issues, the helmet was not manufactured until November 1943. It was produced by three manufacturers in the UK:

Code	Maker	Location
BMB	Briggs Motor Bodies Ltd	Dagenham
F&L	Fisher & Ludlow Ltd	Castle Bromwich
ROCO	Rubery Owen Co. Ltd	Leeds

Helmet manufacture commenced in November 1943 until early 1945 when production shifted to the MK IV helmets. Mk III helmets were initially painted with textured khaki green colour, later replaced by a textured dark brown.

=== Post-war manufactured helmets ===
In 1951, the Belgian military began contracting manufacturers to produce a domestic copy of the Mk III. Most known examples were produced by Sartel. Belgian flag decals were placed on the left side of the helmet, as was customary for Belgian military helmets.

Belgian MK III liners have the manufacturer's name, a production date and their size printed in white ink. The shell itself is devoid of such markings.

The Belgian helmet is a few millimeters longer, front to back, than its British Counterpart. The liner uses brown, not black leather in its construction.

== Users ==
- Australia: Used by the Second Australian Imperial Force during World War II
- Belgium
- British Raj
- Canada: Used during World War II, specifically during the invasion of Normandy
- Malaysia
- Netherlands
- New Zealand
- (Union of South Africa) South Africa
- (Tanganyika (1961–1964)) Tanganyika
- United Kingdom: Used during World War II, specifically during the invasion of Normandy
- Ireland - Used by the Irish UN contingent in the Congo during the Congo Crisis
