= Naim Moghabghab =

Lebanese politician (1911–1959)

- Born: January 11, 1911; Egypt
- Died: July 27, 1959 (aged 48); Maaser Beiteddine, Lebanon
- Other names: Mughabghab, Moughabghab
- Occupations: Lawyer, politician
- Children: 2

Naim Moghabghab (Arabic: نعيم مغبغب) (January 11, 1911 – July 27, 1959) was a Lebanese political leader and an independence hero among Lebanon's Christian population. He founded, along with president Camille Chamoun (in office 1952–1958), the National Liberal Party (حزب الوطنيين الأحرار Hizbu-l-waTaniyyīni-l-aHrār).

He was elected member of Parliament in 1953, re-elected in 1957, and served as Minister of Public Works in 1955. He formed a Christian (Maronite) militia under the name of the "National Guard" for Chamoun's government, and also led the military front in the 1958 revolt to reinforce Camille Chamoun's position.

He was assassinated on 27 July 1959, when his car was attacked by opposition supporters. He received the highest honor of Lebanon: Grand Officer of the National Order of The Cedar.
