= First cabinet of Khaled Chehab =

Lebanese government in 1938

The first Cabinet of Khaled Chehab is the thirteenth government during the French mandate over Lebanon and the sixth during the era of the President of the Republic, Emile Eddé. The government was formed on March 21, 1938 and delivered the ministerial statement on March 25, then it won the acceptance of the House of Representatives with a majority of 41 votes against 14. 3 MPs did not participate, 4 were absent, and one abstained. The government lasted until October 27, 1938.

The first Cabinet of Khaled Chehab
| Image | Portfolio | Minister | Political affiliation | Religious affiliation | Governorate |
|---|---|---|---|---|---|
| | Prime Minister | Khaled Chehab | National Bloc | Sunni | South Governorate |
| | Justice | Khaled Chehab | National Bloc | Sunni | South Governorate |
| | National Defense | Youssef Estephan | National Bloc | Maronite | North Governorate |
| | Interior | Youssef Estephan | National Bloc | Maronite | North Governorate |
| | Finance | Camille Chamoun | Constitutional Bloc | Maronite | Mount Lebanon Governorate |
| | Foreign Affairs | Salim Takla | Constitutional Bloc | Greek Catholic | Mount Lebanon Governorate |
| | Public Works | Salim Takla | Constitutional Bloc | Greek Catholic | Mount Lebanon Governorate |
| | Education | Khalil Kuseib | National Bloc | Greek Orthodox | Beirut |
| | Economy | Khalil Kuseib | National Bloc | Greek Orthodox | Beirut |
| | Agriculture | Hikmat Jumblatt | National Bloc | Druze | Mount Lebanon Governorate |
| | Public Health | Ahmed Abdel Latif Asaad | Constitutional Bloc | Shi'ite | South Governorate |
| | Telecommunications | Ahmed Abdel Latif Asaad | Constitutional Bloc | Shi'ite | South Governorate |

Source: Legallaw

| Name | Ministers |
|---|---|
| National Bloc | 4 / 7 |
| Constitutional Bloc | 3 / 7 |
