= First cabinet of Riad Solh =

The first cabinet of Riad Al Solh, the first under President Bechara El Khoury, was formed on 25 September 1943 and lasted until 3 July 1944.

== Members of government ==
Military Cabinet of Michel Aoun
Image	Portfolio	Minister	Political affiliation	Religious affiliation
	Prime Minister	Riad Al Solh	Constitutional Bloc	Sunni
	Finance	Riad Al Solh	Constitutional Bloc	Sunni
	Deputy Prime Minister	Habib Abou Chahla	National Bloc	Greek Orthodox
	Education	Habib Abou Chahla	National Bloc	Greek Orthodox
	Justice	Habib Abou Chahla	National Bloc	Greek Orthodox
	Interior	Camille Chamoun	Constitutional Bloc	Maronite
	Minister of Telecommunications	Camille Chamoun	Constitutional Bloc	Maronite
	Foreign Affairs	Salim Takla	Constitutional Bloc	Greek Catholic
	Public Works	Salim Takla	Constitutional Bloc	Greek Catholic
	National Defense	Majid Arslan	Constitutional Bloc	Druze
	Agriculture	Majid Arslan	Constitutional Bloc	Druze
	Health	Majid Arslan	Constitutional Bloc	Druze
	Housing	Adel Oseiran	Independent	Shia
	Economy and Trade	Adel Oseiran	Independent	Shia

Name	Ministers
Constitutional Bloc	4 / 6
National Bloc	1 / 6
Independent	1 / 6
