= Safra, Lebanon =

Safra صفرا
- Municipality
- Location in Lebanon
- Coordinates: 34°2′15″N 35°38′16″E
- Country: Lebanon
- Governorate: Keserwan-Jbeil
- District: Keserwan

Area
  - Total: 3.06 km^{2} (1.18 sq mi)
- Elevation: 150 m (490 ft)
- Time zone: UTC+2 (EET)
  - Summer (DST): UTC+3 (EEST)

Safra (Arabic: صفرا, romanized: Ṣafrā) is a Mediterranean Lebanese village, located at the middle of the Lebanese coast. Its morphology is rich with natural valleys. Safra is known by its strategic location, old houses and beach resorts. It has a municipality in the Keserwan District of the Keserwan-Jbeil Governorate in Lebanon. It is located 29 kilometers north of Beirut. The village has a land area of 306 hectares. Safra is perched on a curve on a rocky butte overlooking the Mediterranean Sea, standing at an average elevation of 150 meters above sea level,

The inhabitants are predominantly Maronite Catholics.

Hawa Chicken, Lebanon's largest poultry production and distribution company, is based in Safra.

- Safra On Google Maps Street View By Paul Saad

== See also ==
- Safra massacre
