= Mk 6 helmet =

Combat helmet

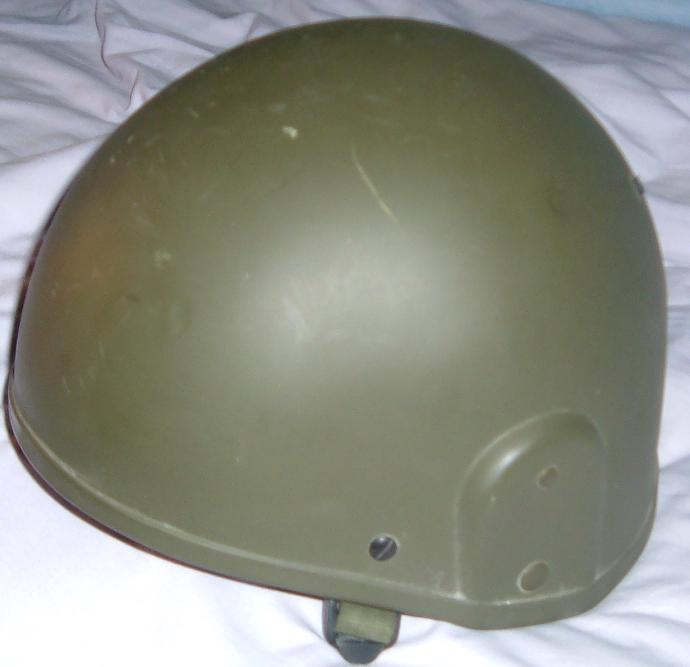
- A British Mk 6 helmet
- Type: Combat helmet
- Place of origin: United Kingdom

Service history
- In service: 1986
- Used by: See Users
- Wars: The Troubles; Gulf War; War in Afghanistan (2001-2021); Iraq War; Russo-Ukrainian War

Production history
- Designer: NP Aerospace

The Mk 6 helmet is a British combat helmet that was the standard issue helmet of the British Armed Forces until its gradual replacement by the Mk 7 helmet. It has also seen use by UN forces during peacekeeping operations. The Mk 6 replaced the Mk IV helmet (more correctly titled – Helmet Steel MK IV, General Service) in army service and the RAC helmet in naval service. The jump in MK numbers is thought to be due to the confusion surrounding the MK IV helmet using the MK V lining, introduced in 1959.

The helmet is manufactured by NP Aerospace, and is reported to have an "almost unlimited service life" by the manufacturer.

== History ==
The Mk 6 was issued to the British military in 1986. They were known to be used in Operation Desert Storm and Desert Shield.

From 1992, the Mk 6 was supplied to the UN alongside the M88, MICH and the M1 to allow for protection of peacekeeping forces. Many military forces used these helmets, such as Argentina, Mexico, and most of the listed UN countries as stated. These were either covered with the respective country's camouflage helmet cover, or issued with a blue Mk 6 cover to indicate it as a peacekeeping helmet.

From June 2009, the helmet was replaced by the Mk 7 helmet.

== Design ==
The Mk 6, in its default configuration, is in dark green color. The British Army use covers to camouflage the helmet and adapt it to different environments. Covers include the British Disruptive Pattern Material in temperate woodland and desert patterns, multicam pattern, Disruptive Pattern Combat Uniform, a pure white cover for arctic environments and a United Nations blue coloured cover. The MK 6 is designed to accept modern ear protection, Bowman personal radios, and respirators.

It is sometimes referred as the "battle bowler", a term first used for the First World War Brodie helmet.

The Mk 6 is often mistakenly thought to be made out of kevlar when in fact it is constructed of ballistic nylon.

== Variants ==
=== Mk 6A ===
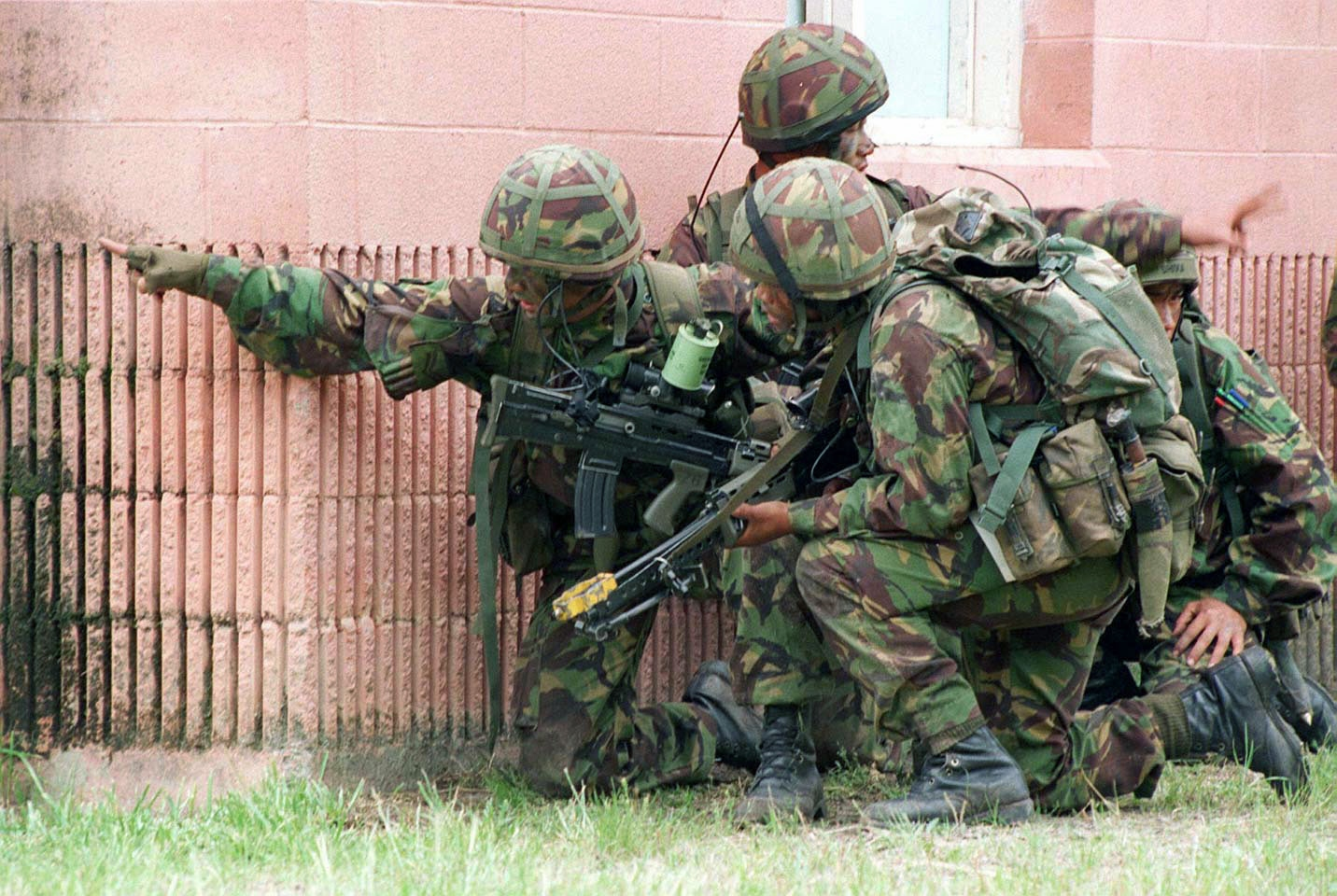
Gurkhas wearing the Mk 6 helmet with temperate DPM covers during an exercise.

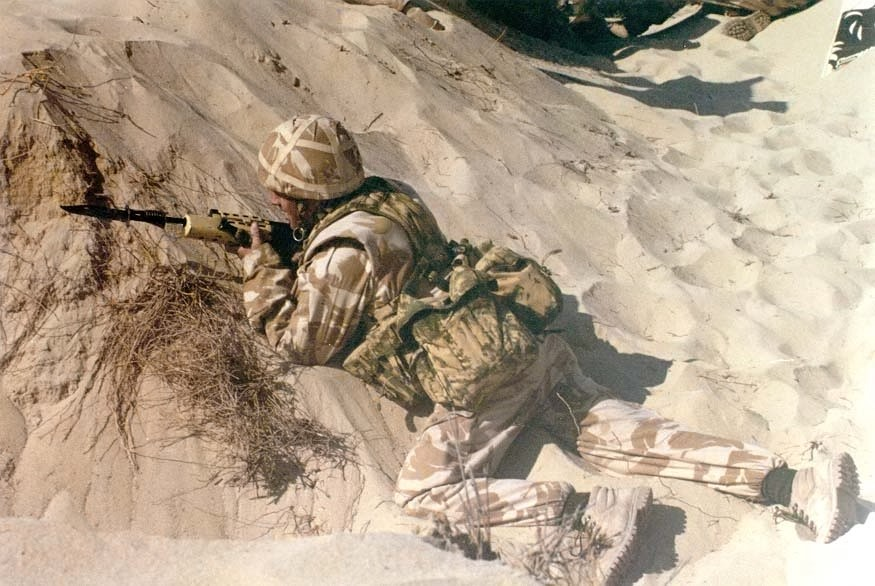
British soldier wearing the Mk 6 helmet with desert DPM cover during Operation Granby.

In 2005, the Mk 6 began to be replaced by an evolution of the original design, the Mk 6A helmet. NP Aerospace also manufactures the Mk 6A.

Although it looks very similar to the Mk 6, the Mk 6A has enhanced ballistic protection and is marginally heavier than the earlier model. The two variants can be easily distinguished from each other when the cover is removed, as the material of the Mk 6 is olive green whilst the Mk 6A is black.

== Users ==
=== Current ===
- Bermuda
- Ghana
- Iraq
  - Iraqi Kurdistan
- Ukraine – 2,000 helmets were supplied by the British Government (bringing the total supplied to 3,000) to the Ukrainian government on 3 July 2015; further helmet donations were made during the 2022 Russian invasion of Ukraine.

=== Former ===
- Afghanistan
- Netherlands: Worn by Korps Mariniers personnel assigned to UK/Netherlands Landing Force
- United Kingdom: Replaced with Mk 7 helmet.
  - British Hong Kong

== See also ==
- Mk 7 helmet - Mk 6 replacement, general issue commenced in June 2009
