= Mk IV helmet =

British combat helmet

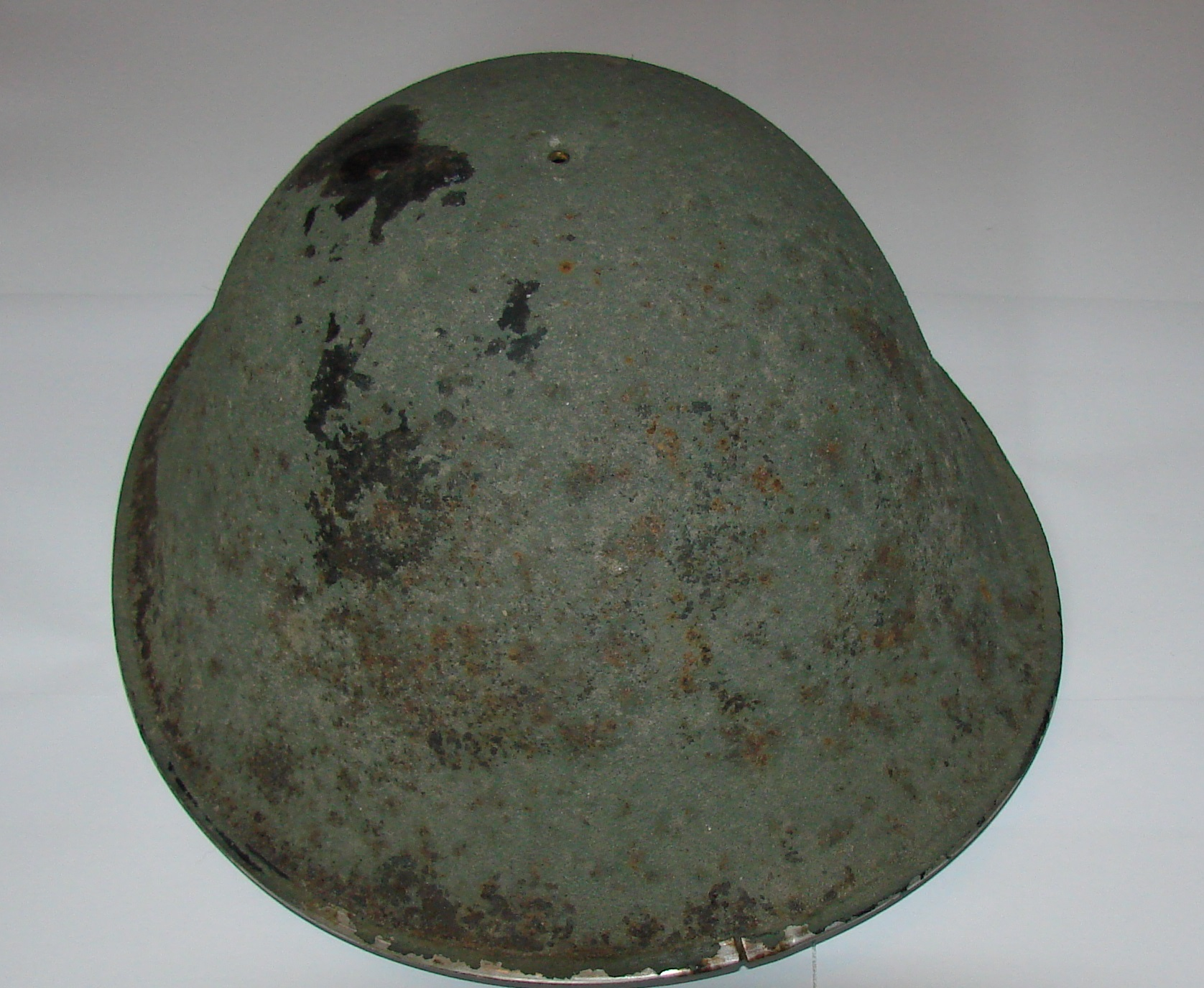
Canadian Mk IV helmet

Mk IV helmet is a combat helmet that was used by the British Army in the 1950s to 1980s.

It replaced the Mk III helmet and became the British Army's last metal helmet when it was replaced by the composite material Mk 6 helmet in 1985.

== Design ==
The Mark IV helmet was a modified design of the Mk III helmet with the chinstrap rivet moved down the bottom of the helmet shell as well as the introduction of a lift the dot style fastener for the inner liner.

== Users ==
=== Former ===
- United Kingdom - Used during the Korean War
- Croatia - Used by Croatian forces during the Croatian War of Independence
- Malaysia

== Bibliography ==
- Thomas, Nigel; Mikulan, Krunoslav (2006). The Yugoslav Wars (1): Slovenia & Croatia 1991–95. Bloomsbury Publishing. ISBN 978-1841769639.
- Brayley, Martin J. (2008). Tin Hats to Composite Helmets: A Collector's Guide. Crowood Press UK. ISBN 978-1847970244.
