= Safra massacre =

1980 battle during the Lebanese Civil War

- Part of Lebanese Civil War & Inter-Christian conflicts in Lebanon
Date	7 July 1980
Location	Safra, Lebanon
Result	Decisive Kataeb Party victory: Tigers Militia liquidated; survivors incorporated into Lebanese Forces; Elias El-Hannouche flees to the Beqaa Valley and forms the "Free Tigers"

Belligerents
Kataeb Party: Lebanese Forces; Tyous Team of Commandos	NLP: Tigers Militia

Commanders and leaders
Pierre Gemayel; Bashir Gemayel; Elie Hobeika	Camille Chamoun; Dany Chamoun; Elias El-Hannouche

Strength
Unknown	500 fighters

Casualties and losses
- 83 people killed

The Safra massacre, or the Day of the Long Knives, occurred in the coastal town of Safra (north of Beirut) on 7 July 1980, during the Lebanese civil war, as part of Bashir Gemayel's effort to consolidate all the Christians fighters under his leadership in the Lebanese Forces by eliminating rival militias.

The Phalangist forces launched a surprise attack on the Tigers, a 500-man militia that was the armed force of the National Liberal Party of former Lebanese President Camille Chamoun. The attack was supposed to be conducted at around 4:00 a.m., but in order to spare the life of Camille's son and commander of the Tigers Dany Chamoun, the attack was postponed to 10:00 a.m. to make sure that Dany left for Fakra. The attack claimed the lives of roughly 83 people.

Prior to the attack, Camille Chamoun decided to disarm the militia in order to avoid further bloodshed from both the Phalangists and the Tigers.

Since that time, the National Liberal Party has survived only as a political party as the Tigers were virtually wiped out in the July 1980 assault.

== See also ==
- List of extrajudicial killings and political violence in Lebanon
- Inter-Christian conflicts in Lebanon
- List of massacres in Lebanon
