= Camille Dory Chamoun =

Lebanese politician

Camille Dory Chamoun (Arabic: كميل دوري شمعون, romanized: Kamīl Dūrī Shamʿūn; 1957) is a Lebanese politician and a member of Lebanon's parliament. In April 2021 he was elected head of the National Liberal Party.

== Early life ==
Chamoun was born into a prominent Maronite political family in the town of Deir el Qamar in the Chouf district. His father is the former president of the NLP, Dory Chamoun.

He joined the Free Tigers militia, the military wing of the National Liberal Party, and participated in the battles of the first phase of the civil war before traveling to London to complete his studies.

== Politics ==
After a 30 year long absence in Lebanese politics Chamoun ran in 2005 parliamentary elections for the Maronite seat in the Chouf district, his family's historic stronghold, but lost to the Free Patriotic Movement list. He ran again in 2018 but lost with only 1,084 votes.

He assumed the presidency of the party to succeed his father on April 10, 2021, while Robert Khoury was chosen as his deputy. Chamoun sought to introduce a new dynamic to the party by opening or reopening a number of offices, the Aqiba branch in the Keserwan district on October 10, 2021 the Zahle Bekaa Commission on October 30, 2021, and the Batroun Commission on December 12, 2021.

During the 2022 Lebanese General election, Camille Dory Chamoun announced his candidacy along with two others in the districts of Matn, Baabda and Chouf, in alliance with Lebanese Forces Party and the PSP. On April 9, Chamoun participated in launching the list in Abadieh. On May 1, during the opening of its commission headquarters in Keserwan district headed by Chamoun, the party presented its electoral points, which included: sovereignty, positive impartiality, independence of the judiciary, expanded administrative decentralization, restoring confidence in the banking sector, and the return of refugees and displaced persons. The National Liberal Party was able to secure a single seat through Camille Chamoun in Baabda with 1,876 votes.
