= National Liberal Party (Lebanon) =

Political party in Lebanon

National Liberal Party حزب الوطنيين الأحرار
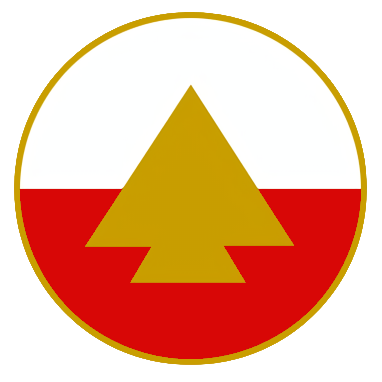
- Abbreviation: NLP
- President: Camille Dory Chamoun
- Vice president: Fady Samaha
- General Secretary: François Zaatar
- Founder: Camille Chamoun
- Founded: 10 September 1958; 67 years ago
- Headquarters: Rue du Liban, Achrafieh, Beirut
- Military wing: Tigers Militia (1968–1980)
- Ideology: Lebanese nationalism Civic nationalism Economic liberalism National liberalism Liberal conservatism Federalism
- Political position: Centre-right
- National affiliation: Strong Republic
- Regional affiliation: Arab Liberal Federation
- Colours: Red Gold White
- Military wing: Tigers Militia (1968–1980)
- Parliament of Lebanon: 1 / 128
- Cabinet of Lebanon: 0 / 30

Party flag
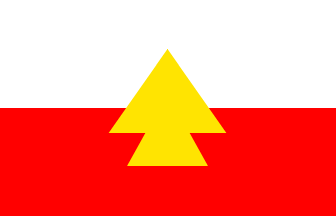

Website
- ahrar.me

The National Liberal Party (NLP, Arabic: حزب الوطنيين الأحرار, Ḥizb Al-Waṭaniyyīn Al-Aḥrār) is a nationalist political party in Lebanon, established by President Camille Chamoun in 1958. It is now under the leadership of Camille Dory Chamoun, his grandson, who is the MP for the Maronite seat in Baabda, elected in the 2022 Lebanese parliamentary elections allied with the Lebanese Forces Party.

== Policies ==
The party has adopted a hard line in regard to the preservation of Lebanese independence, and to the safeguard of the distinctive liberal practices in Lebanon with respect to freedom of expression and opinion and religious freedoms. Most Lebanese political parties have a sectarian basis; although the NLP during the civil war was mainly supported by Christians, the NLP is a non-sectarian, national, liberal, political party that adopted the Chamoun'ism (الفكر الشمعوني) that transcends sectarianism and has support among Lebanese citizens of different religions or sects.

== History ==
=== Formation ===
While in England and the United States, Camille Chamoun developed an appreciation for political, economic, and social liberalism, particularly in the media. After his presidential career ended, he set up the National Liberal Party to represent his views. Politically, he was anti-French and pro-British, and strongly supported independent action. The ideology of the National Liberal Party was primarily focused on allegiance to Chamoun and support for Lebanese independence. It distinguished itself from other parties mainly by its support for democratic governance and a free enterprise system.

=== Early politics and the Lebanese civil war ===
In 1968, the party joined The Helf Alliance formed with the two other big mainly Christian parties in Lebanon: the Kataeb of Pierre Gemayel, and National Bloc of Raymond Eddé. During the Lebanese Civil War of 1975–90, the NLP was aligned with the mainly Maronite Christian alliance who fought the Lebanese National Movement (LNM). It had its own armed militia, the Tigers. In 1976, the NLP joined with the Kataeb Party (Phalange) and the Lebanese Renewal Party (LRP) to form the Lebanese Front, a political coalition. This was paralleled by the joining of the militias under a central command, the Lebanese Forces, headed by Phalange leader Bashir Gemayel. In 1980, Gemayel turned on the Tigers, and in a surprise attack in Safra eliminated the militia. The NLP has survived as a party, however. Nevertheless, with the death of Camille Chamoun in 1987 and the assassination of his successor and son Dany in 1990, combined with the rise of the Lebanese Forces as political party, it seems that the NLP's political influence has considerably declined comparing to the 1960s and 1970s.

=== Modern politics ===
Following an ambush in Tabarja of a minibus carrying Syrian workers in which the driver was killed, 18 December 1996, and a number of attempted bombings, forty members of the NLP were detained by the security services. Some of those detained were later charged with offences such as having contacts with Israel, inciting Lebanese soldiers to disobey orders and “disturbing Lebanon’s relations with a friendly country”.

In 2005 the NLP was part of the Qornet Shehwan Gathering, opposed to the Syrian occupation of Lebanon, but later "took a long break" from activities in the March 14 Alliance but did not withdraw their membership.

During the 2022 Lebanese General election, Camille Dory Chamoun announced his candidacy along with two others in the districts of Matn, Baabda and Chouf, in alliance with Lebanese Forces Party and the PSP. On April 9, Chamoun participated in launching the list in Abadieh. On May 1, during the opening of its commission headquarters in Keserwan district headed by Chamoun, the party presented its electoral points, which included: sovereignty, positive impartiality, independence of the judiciary, expanded administrative decentralization, restoring confidence in the banking sector, and the return of refugees and displaced persons. The National Liberal Party was able to secure a single seat through Camille Chamoun in Baabda with 1,876 votes.

== Presidents of the National Liberal Party ==
	Leader	From	To
1	Camille Chamoun	1958	1985
2	Dany Chamoun	1985	1990
3	Dory Chamoun	1991	2021
4	Camille Dory Chamoun	2021	present
