= Kazem al-Khalil =

Minister of the Lebanese government (1901–1990)

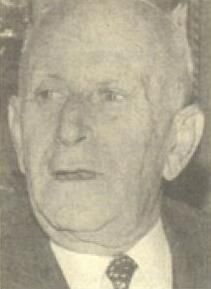
Kazem al-Khalil

Kazem Ismail al-Khalil (1901 – 22 April 1990) – commonly known as Kazem al-Khalil or Kazem el-Khalil, also transliterated Kazim from the Arabic (كاظم إسماعيل الخليل) – was a lawyer, doyen member of the Lebanese parliament, seven-time minister of the Lebanese government and right-wing militia-leader from a Shiite feudal dynasty in Southern Lebanon.

== Life ==
=== Family background ===
When the 1858 Ottoman Land reforms led to the accumulated ownership of large tracts of land by a few families upon the expense of the peasants, the al-Khalil family of grain merchants rose from the urban class of the mercantilist notables ("Wujaha' ") to the rank of Zu'ama (feudal landlords) in Tyre. The clan would go on to play a dominant role in the city for more than a century. It was reportedly a branch of the Al-Zayn (or El Zein) family in Nabatieh, which has been one of the main dynasties in Jabal Amel (modern-day Southern Lebanon), and connected to another feudal clan, the Sidon-based Osseirans, by marriage. Their arrival in Tyre was apparently welcomed at first:

"According to one source, they were supported by the ulama in their climb to prominence in an effort to undermine the unpopular dominance of the Sunni al-Mamluk family of that city."

However, it is undisputed that the uneducated population of Jabal Amal lived in

"a 'dark age' of ignorance and feudalism; it was a time when the masses, al ama, were terrified of their masters and landlords, of the Ottoman Officialdom, a time when the flock [..] took life as 'slavery and obedience."

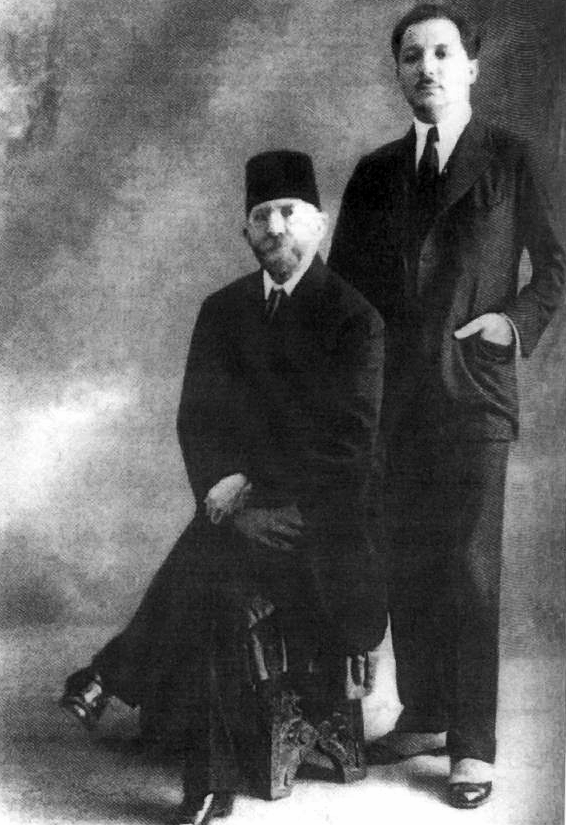
Riad al-Solh and his father Reda Al Solh in 1924

The 1908 Young Turk Revolution and its call for elections to an Ottoman parliament triggered a power-struggle in Jabal Amel: on the one hand side Rida al-Sulh of a Sunni dynasty from Sidon, which had sidelined the Shia Al-As'ad clan of the Ali al-Saghir dynasty (see above) in the coastal region with support from leading Shiite families like the al-Khalil clan in Tyre. His opponent was Kamil Al-As'ad from the Ali al-Saghir dynasty that still dominated the hinterland. The latter won that round of the power-struggle, but the political rivalry between al-Khalil and Al-As'ad would go on to be a main feature of Lebanese Shia politics for the next sixty years.

in 1915, Abdel Karim al-Khalil – the leader of the al-Khalil clan – was executed by the Ottoman regime "at the instigation" of Kamil al-As'ad from the rival Ali al-Saghir dynasty, some believed.

After the Arab Revolt against the Ottoman rule started in 1916 and the Sharifian Army conquered the Levant in 1918 with support from the British Empire, the Jamal Amil feudal leader Kamil al-As'ad of the Ali al-Saghir dynasty, who had been an Ottomanist before, declared the area – including Tyre – part of the Arab Kingdom of Syria on 5 October 1918. However, the pro-Damascus regime in Beirut appointed Riad al-Sulh as governor of Sidon who in turn appointed Kazem's uncle Abdullah Yahya al-Khalil in Tyre as the head of the provisional Arab government of Tyre to represent Faisal I.

When the French colonial rulers proclaimed the new State of Greater Lebanon under the guardianship of the League of Nations represented by France on the first of September 1920, the first municipality in Tyre was founded and headed by Ismail Yahia al-Khalil, Kazem al-Khalil's father. In the following years, the Mandatory regime gave Shiite feudal families like al-As'ad and al-Khalil

"a free hand in enlarging their personal fortunes and reinforcing their clannish powers."

Altogether, even compared to other clans

"The Khalils, with their age-old ways, [..] were known for being particularly rough and hard."

Within this competitive context, Kazem al-Khalil earned himself a reputation as a "tough" power player.

=== Education ===
Al-Khalil received his primary education at the elementary Marist Brothers School in Sidon and his secondary education in Beirut. He subsequently attended the American University of Beirut and finally studied law at the Damascus University from where he graduated in 1931.

=== Professional career ===
Still in 1931, al-Khalil started practicing as a lawyer. Two years later, he was appointed a judge in Damour. In 1936 he was appointed a judge in Tripoli.

=== Political career ===
==== First phase of parliamentary and ministerial positions (1937–1960) ====
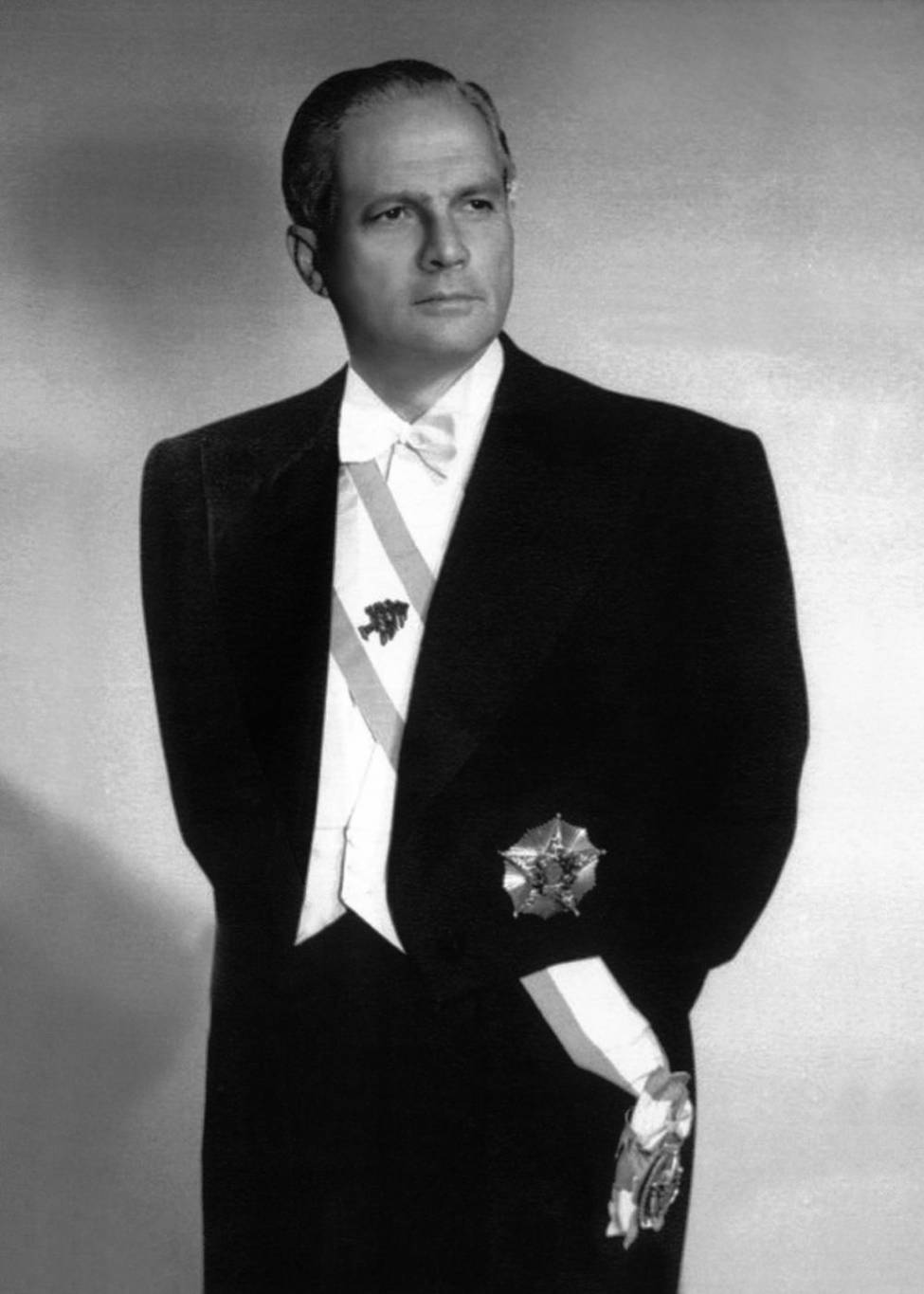
Camille Chamoun

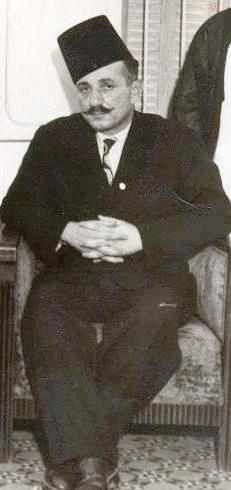
Ahmed al-Asaad

After the death of his father Ismail Al-Khalil, Kazem entered the political arena and was elected as deputy (member of the Lebanese parliament) for the first time in 1937. He was re-elected in the general election of 1943, shortly before Lebanese independence on 22 November of that year, and became

"very active in the plenary sessions. His political activity was linked to his family ties, as he was married to the daughter of Ibrahim Haidar, the Shi'te Za'im from the Biqa' and father-in-law of 'Adil Osseyran. When Al-Khalil ran in the election of 1937, he conditioned his pro-French stance on the agreement of the Mandatory government to add Ibrahim Haydar to his list."

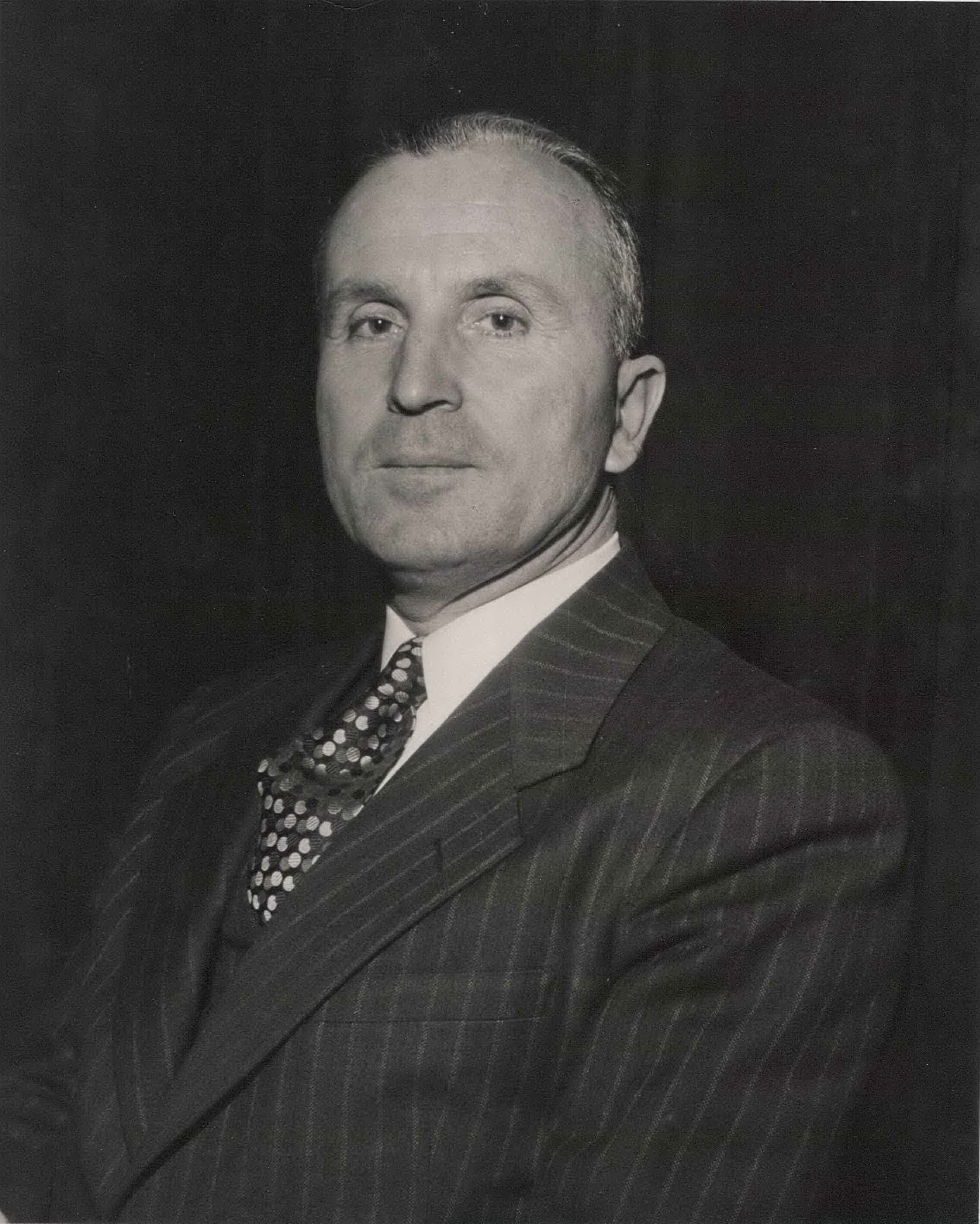
Abdallah El-Yafi (1901–1986)

In the following one and a half decades the tensions in the fight for the political domination in Southern Lebanon between the inter-married Osseirans and al-Khalils – Kazem's sister Nashura was married to Kamil Osseiran – on the one hand side and Ahmed al-Asaad on the other side steadily escalated. While Asaad rose to the position of Speaker of the Parliament from 1951 until 1953, al-Khalil became secretary-general of the National Liberal Party led by Camille Chamoun, the second President of the Republic.

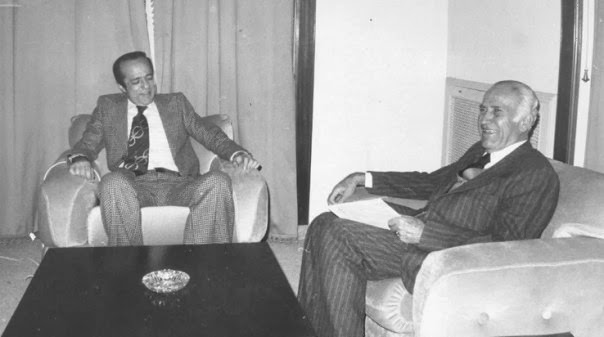
Al-Khalil's ally Adil Osseyran (right) and his rival Kamil al-Asa'ad in 1968

In the 1953 elections, al-Khalil was elected as deputy again and joined the cabinet of Prime Minister Abdallah Yafi. He served first as Minister of Agriculture and then Minister of Health for one year. From October 1955 to March 1956 he served under Prime Minister Rashid Karami first as Minister for Social Affairs and then as Minister of Telephone, Post and Telegraph. From August 1957 until September 1958 he was at first the Minister of Agriculture and then the Minister of Finance and Planning in the government of Prime Minister Sami al-Sulh, as the only Shiite representative in the cabinet.

With his re-election in the 1957 polls: after President Camille Chamoun had introduced a new electoral system, al-Khalil's rival Ahmed al-Asaad for the first time lost his seat, since he had to run in al-Khalil's stronghold of Tyre rather than in his traditional home base of Bint-Jbeil. As a consequence, al-Asaad became a "major instigator of events against Chamoun" and his allies, primarily al-Khalil.

"Kazim's followers had a free hand in Tyre; they could carry Guns on the streets".

==== 1958 Lebanese Civil War ====
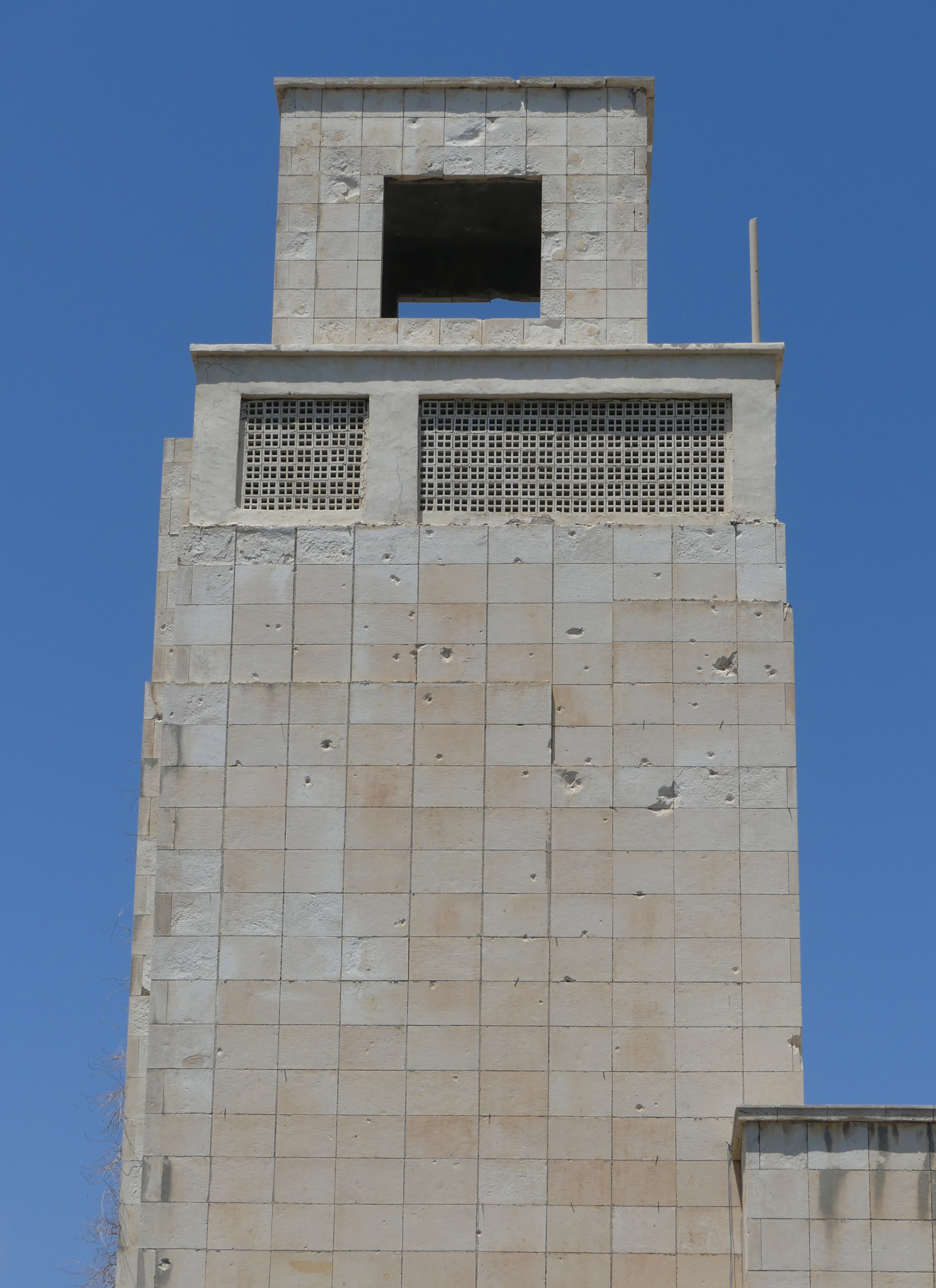
Bullet holes from 1958 at Jafariya

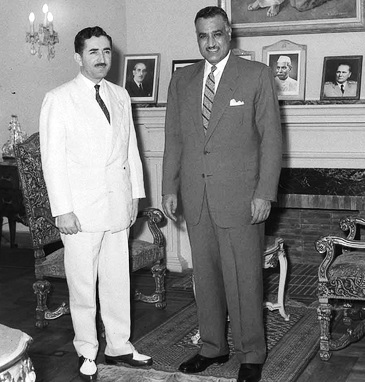
Karami (left) and Nasser in 1959

Then, after the formation of the United Arab Republic (UAR) under Gamal Abdel Nasser in February 1958, tensions escalated in Tyre between the forces of Chamoun and supporters of Pan-Arabism. Demonstrations took place – as in Beirut and other cities – that promoted pro-union slogans and protested against US foreign policy. The Jafariya school became the base of the opposition. Still in February, five of its students were arrested and "sent to jail for trampling on the Lebanese flag and replacing it with that of the UAR." Hussein Sharafeddin, a nephew of Imam Sayed Abdul Hussein Sharafeddin and as the director of Jafariya a leader in the protests, was imprisoned, too:

"The issue caused violent parliamentary wrangling between [..] Kazem al-Khalil, and the Greek-Catholic twin brothers Nicolas and Joseph Slam, who were accused by him of fanning riots."

On 28 March, soldiers and followers of Kazem al-Khalil opened fire on demonstrators and – according to some reports – killed three. On the second of April, four or five protestors were killed and about a dozen injured. Al-Khalil alleged "that some of the demonstrators had thrown sticks of dynamite before the gendarmes fired", but this was not corroborated.

Subsequently, opposition leaders like Rashid Karami expressed support for the people of Tyre, and the neighbouring city of Sidon/Saida joined the strike. A US-Diplomat, who travelled the region shortly afterwards, reported though that the clashes were more related to the personal feud between al-Asaad and al-Khalil than to national politics.

In May, the insurgents in Tyre gained the upper hand. Ahmad al-As'ad and his son Kamil al-Asaad supported them, also with weapons. According to a general delegate of the International Committee of the Red Cross (ICRC) who visited in late July, "heavy fighting went on for 16 days".

The 1958 Lebanon crisis dissolved in September, when Chamoun stepped down. Al-Khalil returned still in 1958, but was attacked several times by gunmen. Despite the victory of the al-As'ad dynasty, who had played an important role in Jabal Amel for almost three centuries, its power began to crumble at the same time as al-Khalil's with the arrival of a newcomer:

==== Exit from parliament (1960–1972) ====
After Imam Sharafeddin's death in 1957, his son Sayed Jafar Sharafeddin and other representatives of the Shia community of Southern Lebanon asked his relative Sayed Musa Sadr to be his successor as Imam. In 1959, Sadr moved to Tyre and at first encountered not only suspicion, but also opposition. Yet, within just a few years he managed to create a broad following.

In the 1960 general election, al-Khalil lost his seat as deputy in parliament in the national election despite his alliance with wealthy expatriates in West Africa, allegedly also due to intrigues of the Lebanese Deuxième Bureau intelligence agency.

"His political activity became anti-establishment until he was suspected of being involved in a coup attempt in late December 1961, for which the Syrian Nationalist Party was responsible."

In the 1964 general election, al-Khalil lost again to his rival, likewise in the 1968 election, when he came in at a close fourth place. Hence, the former minister complained about "armed demonstrations, bribery, and arrests". While the extent of apparent irregularities could not be determined, there is evidence that Khalil himself had sought financial assistance from the US Embassy in Beirut.

In 1968, al-Khalil played a key role as vice-president of Chamoun's National Liberal Party when it joined the Tripartite Alliance with the two other main rightwing parties: Pierre Gemayel's Kataeb and the National Bloc of Raymond Eddé.

Thus, al-Khalil did keep considerable influence not only on the national stage, but also in foreign relations, since one of his three sons – Khalil Khalil – became Lebanon's Ambassador to the Imperial State of Iran in 1971. He kept that position until 1978.

Meanwhile, in 1972 Maha al-Khalil Chalabi – one of Kazem's two daughters – founded the commercial "Festivals de Tyr".

==== Second phase of parliamentary and ministerial positions (after 1972) ====
It was only in the 1972 general election – the last electoral contest for the following two decades – that al-Khalil regained his seat. He subsequently became one of the fiercest opponents of the Palestinian fighters who were building up a strong presence in the Tyre area.

Still in 1972, al-Khalil became once again a minister in the government after some fourteen years. At first, he was appointed Minister of Labor and Social Affairs in the cabinet of prime minister Saeb Salam and then from 1973 to 1974 as Minister of Justice in the government of Takieddin el-Solh.

==== Lebanese Civil War (1975–1990) ====
===== PLO-takeover of Tyre =====
In January 1975, a unit of the Popular Front for the Liberation of Palestine (PFLP) attacked the Tyre barracks of the Lebanese Army. One of the residences of al-Khalil "was dynamited" and another one of his homes "was seized by Palestinian guerrillas". The PFLP-operation was at first denounced though by the mainstream Palestinian Liberation Organisation (PLO), but a year later local commanders of the PLO took over the municipal government of Tyre with support from their allies of the Lebanese Arab Army (LAA). They declared the founding of the "People's Republic of Tyre", occupied the army barracks, set up roadblocks and started collecting customs at the port. Parts of Kazem al-Khalil's estate were confiscated as well. He subsequently lived in Christian-dominated east Beirut

"in a sprawling villa in the suburb of Hazmieh."

Al-Khalil did not return to Tyre for seven years:

==== End of the Civil War and death ====
On 5 November 1989 the 88-year-old warlord had one more spectacular appearance on the political stage: two weeks after the signing of the Taif Agreement to end the civil war, as the doyen of the Lebanese Parliament he presided over the election of René Moawad as president. However, Moawad was assassinated by unknown assailants less than three weeks later. Al-Khalil himself died peacefully on Sunday, 22 April 1990, of a heart attack in Paris.

"He had been in excellent health and on Saturday presided over a meeting of Lebanese deputies living in Paris, the family said."

In accordance with his wishes he was buried in Damascus at the shrine of Sayeda Zeinab, which in Twelver Shia Muslim tradition contains the grave of Zaynab, the daughter of the first Shia Imam ‘Alī and Fātimah, the daughter of the Islamic prophet Muhammad.

== Legacy ==
In the 1992 general election, one of Kazem's sons – Nasir Al Khalil – was restrained to succeed his father as MP because of an assassination attempt from the Amal Movement where he nearly lost his life. Likewise, the traditional rival Kamil al-As'ad from the feudal dynasty of Ali al-Saghir lost with his candidacy against Amal politicians. Nasir failed gain in the 1996 general election. However, a decade later another scion of this "neo-feudal" clan – Ali Hassan Khalil – joined Amal and thus won a parliamentary seat against Ahmed al-As'ad from the arch-rival Ali al-Saghir dynasty in Marjayoun Hasbaiya. His son, Khalil Khalil, served as ambassador of Lebanon in various countries.

In 2013, Kazem's daughter Maha, who frequently invokes her father as the main source of inspiration for her cultural activities, made international headlines as founder and president of the International Association to Save Tyre (Association Internationale pour la Sauvegarde de Tyr – AIST): it launched an online raffle in association with Sotheby's to fund the artisans’ village "Les Ateliers de Tyr" at the outskirts of the city. Participants could purchase tickets for 100 Euros to win the 1914 ‘Man with Opera Hat’ painting by Pablo Picasso. The event was created by Maha's daughter Périhane Chalabi Cochin, a French TV host, who is more commonly known as Péri Cochi. The proceeds totaled US$5.26 million. The painting was won by a 25-year-old fire-safety official from Pennsylvania.

In February 2016, Maha al-Khalil Chalabi was designated UNESCO Goodwill Ambassador – a celebrity advocate of the United Nations Educational, Scientific and Cultural Organization, not diplomatic ambassador – in recognition of her commitment to the "League of Canaanite, Phoenician and Punic Cities", which she founded in 2009. It includes the AIST and al-Khalil Chalabi's Fondation Tyr, which is based in the prestigious Avenue Foch in Paris, one of the most expensive addresses in the world.
