= Eddé =

Eddé may refer to:

== People ==
- Anne-Marie Eddé (born 1950), French historian
- Carlos Eddé (born 1956), Lebanese politician
- Dominique Eddé (born 1953), Lebanese writer
- Émile Eddé (1884–1949), Lebanese politician
- Michel Eddé (1928–2019), Lebanese politician
- Raymond Eddé (1913–2000), Lebanese politician

== Places ==
- Eddé or Edde, Lebanon

== See also ==
- Edde (disambiguation)
