= Edde (surname) =

Edde is a name which is used both a given name and a surname. People with the name include:

== Surname ==
- Émile Eddé (1886–1949), Lebanese lawyer and politician
- Carlos Eddé (born 1956), Lebanese politician
- Michel Eddé (1928–2019), Lebanese lawyer and politician
- Ragi Edde (born 1985), Lebanese swimmer
- Raymond Eddé (1913–2000), Lebanese politician

== Given name ==
- Edde Gleerup (1860–1928), Swedish soldier and explorer
