= 1964 Lebanese presidential election =

- 18 August 1964

99 members of the Parliament 66 votes needed to win
- Turnout: 100%
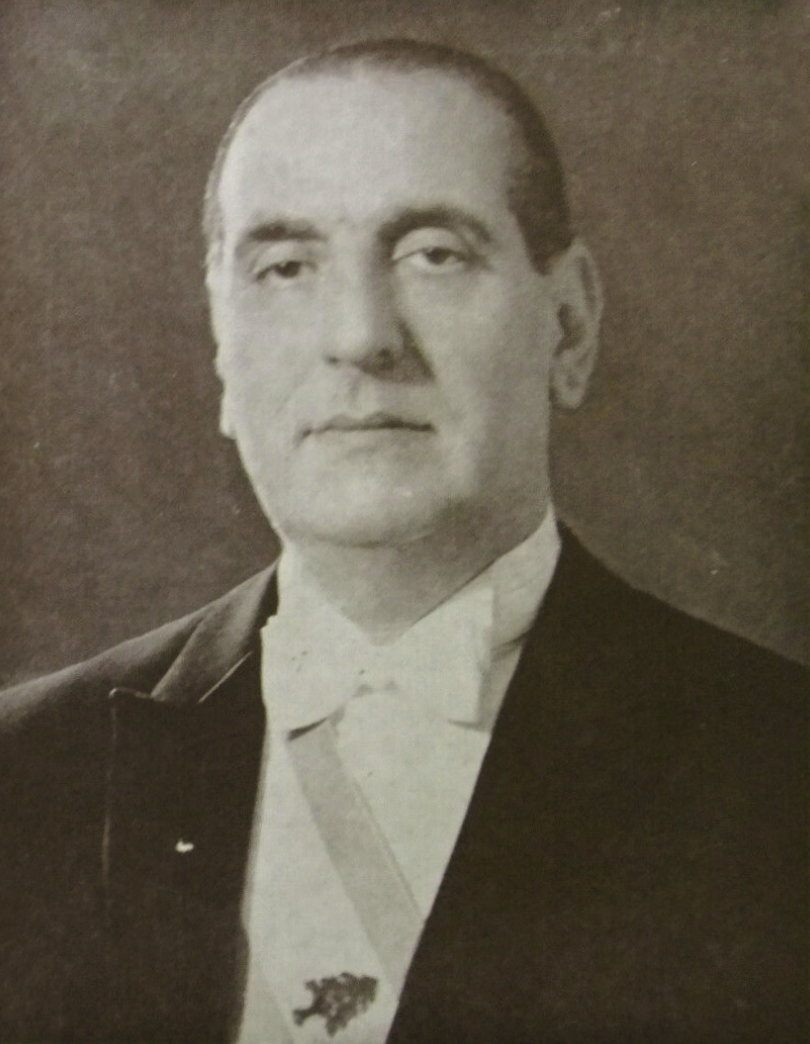

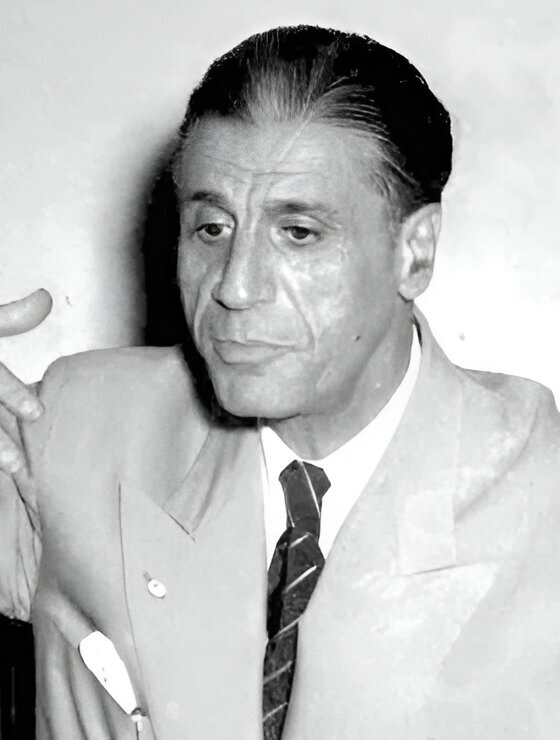
Nominee	Charles Helou	Pierre Gemayel
Party	Chehabist	Kataeb
Electoral vote	92	5
Percentage	94.85%	5.15%
President before election
Fouad Chehab
Chehabist
Elected President
Charles Helou
Chehabist

An indirect presidential election was held in the Parliament of Lebanon on 18 August 1964, resulting in Charles Helou being elected President of the Lebanese Republic.

By convention, the presidency is always attributed to a Maronite Christian. Under the article 49 of the Lebanese Constitution, a qualified majority of two-thirds of the members of the then 99-seat Lebanese Parliament is required to elect the president in the first round. After the second round of election, the president is elected by an absolute majority of the total number of deputies in office.

== Results ==
All 99 MPs of parliament were present. The first round of voting saw Charles Helou winning 92 votes, 5 votes for Pierre Gemayel along with 2 blank ballots.

Candidate	Votes	%
Charles Helou	92	94.85
Pierre Gemayel	5	5.15
Total	97	100.00
Blank votes	2	2.02
Total votes	99	–
Registered voters/turnout	99	100.00

== Aftermath ==
The impressive economic growth that characterized Helou's presidency translated into a cultural and lifestyle belle époque in Lebanon (perhaps this gained the name for Beirut as the 'Paris of the Orient' and Lebanon as the 'Switzerland of the East'). However this period was also partly marred by the Intra Bank crisis of 1966 and Lebanon's increasing inability to avoid involvement in the Arab–Israeli conflict. The Six-Day War of 1967, strained sectarian relations in Lebanon. Many Muslims wanted Lebanon to join the Arab war effort, while many Christians wished to eschew participation. Helou managed to keep Lebanon from entanglement, apart from a brief air strike, but found it impossible to put the lid on the tensions that had been raised. Parliamentary elections in 1968 revealed an increasing polarization in the country, with two major coalitions, one pro-Arab Nationalism, led by Rashid Karami and the other pro-Western, led jointly by former President Camille Chamoun, Pierre Gemayel and Raymond Eddé, both made major gains and won 30 of the 99 seats each.
