= Maha al-Khalil Chalabi =

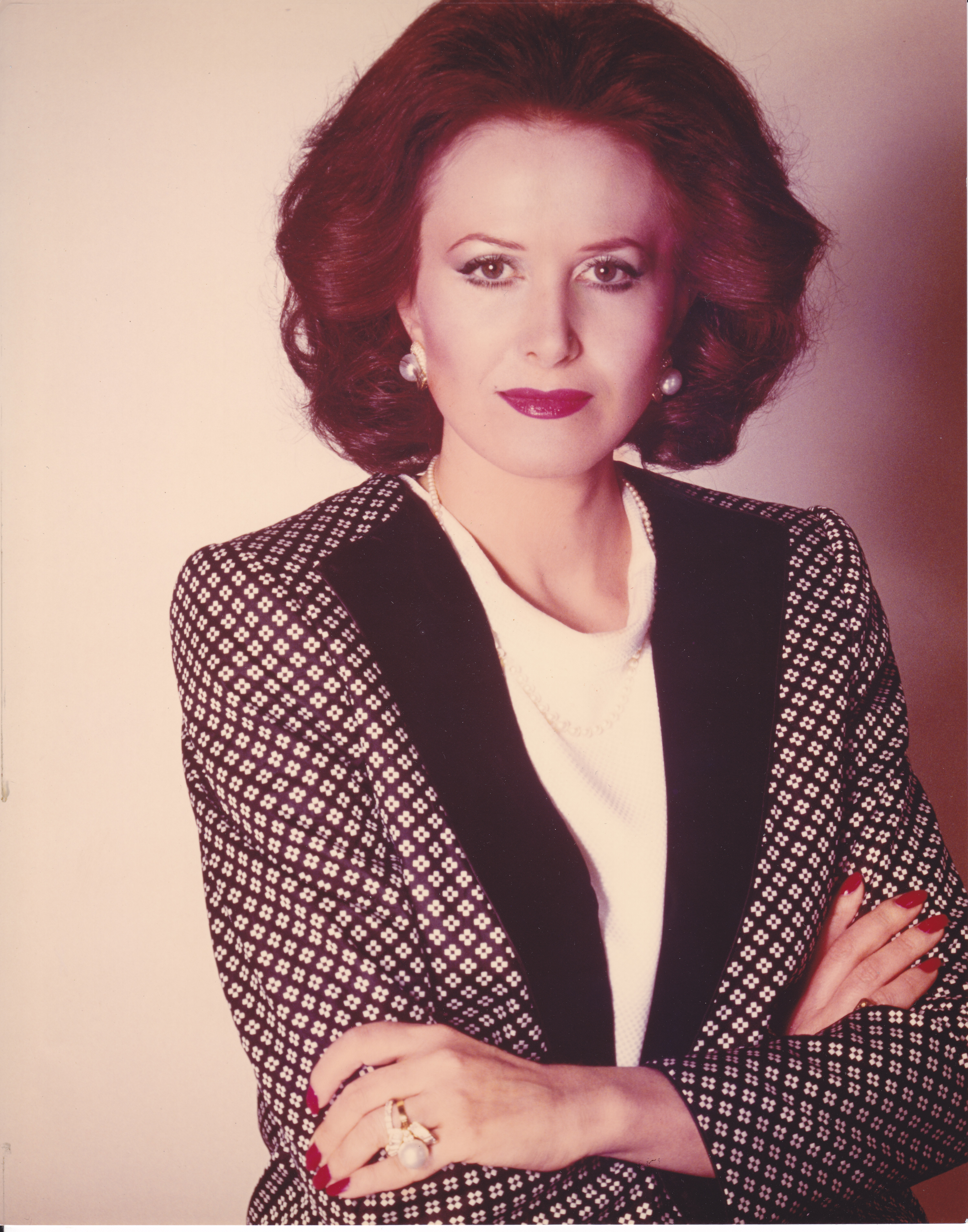
Maha El Khalil Chalabi

Maha al-Khalil Chalabi (born 2 April 1938 in Tyre/Sour, Lebanon) – Arabic: مهى الخليل الشلبي, also transliterated Shalabi – is Secretary-General of the International Association to Save Tyre (Association Internationale pour la Sauvegarde de Tyr – AIST) and has been a UNESCO Goodwill Ambassador as "a strong advocate for heritage". Oscillating between the high-societies of Beirut and Paris, the heiress of a feudal dynasty in Southern Lebanon has been hailed by the yellow press as the "Princess of Tyre".

== Life ==
=== Family background ===
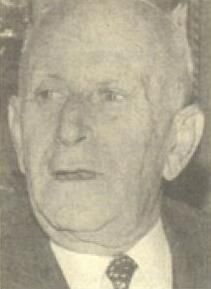
Kazem al-Khalil

Maha al-Khalil Chalabi regularly invokes her father Kazem al-Khalil (1901-1989) as the main source of inspiration for her cultural activities. He was the scion of a Shiite clan of land barons in Jabal Amel, modern-day Southern Lebanon: When the 1858 Ottoman Land reforms led to the accumulated ownership of large tracts of real estate by a few families upon the expense of the peasants, the al-Khalil family of grain merchants rose from the urban class of the mercantilist notables ("Wujaha' ") to the rank of Zu'ama (feudal landlords) in Tyre. The uneducated population of Jabal Amal lived in

"a 'dark age' of ignorance and feudalism; it was a time when the masses, al ama, were terrified of their masters and landlords, of the Ottoman Officialdom, a time when the flock [..] took life as 'slavery and obedience. The Khalils, with their age-old ways, [..] were known for being particularly rough and hard."

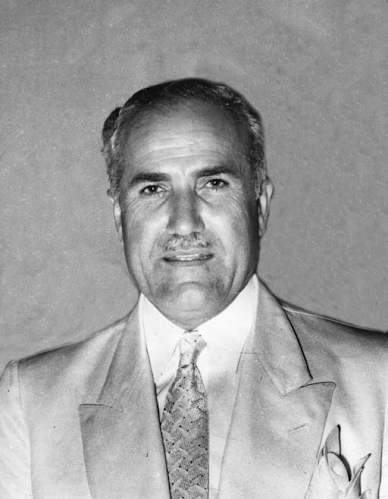
In-law Adel Osseiran

Maha al-Khalil's paternal grandfather Ismail Yahia al-Khalil was the first head of the Tyre municipality, when the French colonial rulers proclaimed the new State of Greater Lebanon under the guardianship of the League of Nations represented by France on the first of September 1920. In the following years, the Mandatory regime gave ruling families like the al-Khalils

"a free hand in enlarging their personal fortunes and reinforcing their clannish powers."

Kazem al-Khalil was elected as deputy (member of the Lebanese parliament) for the first time in 1937 and remained in that office for more than two decades. As a close ally of President Camille Chamoun, he served as a minister in various cabinets between 1953 and 1958 and earned himself a reputation as a particularly "tough" power-player:

During the 1958 Lebanon crisis Kazem al-Khalil's power-struggle with Ahmed al-Asaad and his son Kamil al-Asaad of a rival Shiite dynasty escalated into an armed conflict that left at least seven anti-Khalil protestors in Tyre dead during March and April. Heavy fighting went on for more than two weeks until the Asaad camp and its Baathist allies - led by Sayed Jafar Sharafeddin, the son of Imam Sayed Abdul Hussein Sharafeddin – gained the upper hand in May. The crisis dissolved in September, when Chamoun stepped down. Al-Khalil returned still in 1958, but was attacked several times by gunmen. In 1960 he also lost his parliamentary seat to Sharafeddin.

Maha al-Khalil's mother Muzain was a daughter of Ibrahim Haydar, the Shi'te Za'im (singular of Zu'ama, see above) from the Beqaa Valley and father-in-law of fellow feudal lord Adel Osseiran, a leader of the Lebanese independence movement. Maha al-Khalil's paternal aunt Nashura was married to another member of the Osseiran clan, Kamil Osseiran. Kazem al-Khalil and his wife had three sons and two daughters.

In 1960, Maha al-Khalil married the Iraqi businessman Talal Chalabi, a brother of the banker and politician Ahmad Chalabi. The Chalabis were the scions of a Shia dynasty of rich merchants and bankers in Baghdad. Ahmad married Leila Osseiran, daughter of Kazem al-Khalil's in-law Adel Osseiran, in 1971. Maha al-Khalil Chalabi and Talal Chalabi have one son, Bashar, and two daughters: Rim and Périhane. The latter is a French TV host, commonly known as Péri Cochin.

=== Education ===
Maha al-Khalil received her secondary education at a school in Beirut run by the Franciscan order. She subsequently graduated in Social sciences at the French Faculty of Medicine in Beirut, followed by studies in art and philosophy at the Beirut University College (BUC) and a degree in Political sciences from the faculty of law at Saint Joseph University in Beirut.

She later attended the École pratique des hautes études (EPHE) at the Sorbonne in Paris, from where she obtained a doctorate in history. Her PhD thesis about the descriptions of Tyre by travellers between the 16th and 19th centuries was published in 1984.

=== Professional, cultural and political activities ===
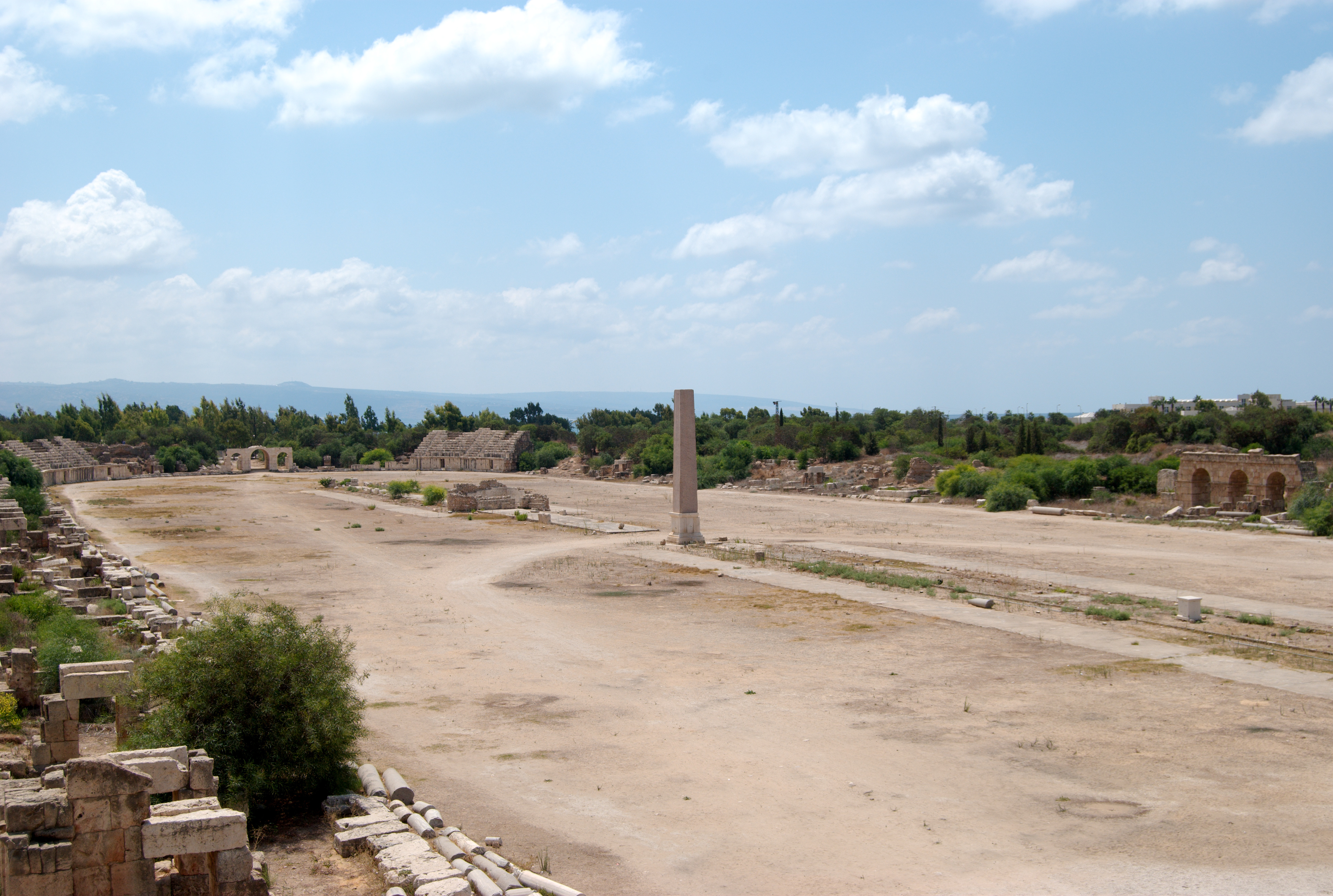
The Roman Hippodrome in Tyre

In the early 1970s, the al-Khalil family staged a political comeback: in 1971, Maha's brother Khalil al-Khalil became Lebanon's Ambassador to the Imperial State of Iran, a position which he kept until 1978. In the 1972 general election, al-Khalil Chalabi's father regained his parliamentary seat after more than a decade as well as cabinet positions, first as Minister of Labor and Social Affairs and then from 1973 to 1974 as Minister of Justice. During those years he became one of the fiercest opponents of the Palestinian fighters who were building up a strong presence in the Tyre area.

Still in 1972, Maha al-Khalil Chalabi started organising the commercial Tyre International Festival, which was to include the re-staging of Roman-style chariot races in the Tyre Hippodrome. In the following year she was elected as a member of the executive committee of the Lebanese Red Cross. The first edition of her Festivals de Tyr was scheduled to take place in 1975, but was thwarted by the outbreak of the Lebanese Civil War.

In 1976, local commanders of the Palestinian Liberation Organisation (PLO) took over the municipal government of Tyre with support from their allies of the Lebanese Arab Army (LAA) and declared the founding of the "People's republic of Tyre". One of the residences of Kazem al-Khalil "was dynamited" and parts of his estate were confiscated. Hence he moved into a "sprawling villa" in the Hazmieh neighbourhood of Christian-dominated east Beirut, while Maha al-Khalil Chalabi settled in Paris for exile.

Following the 1978 South Lebanon conflict with Israel, which also affected Tyre's archaeological sites, al-Khalil Chalabi started lobbying to international institutions for the protection of the ancient relics. In May 1980, she founded the AIST at the headquarters of the United Nations Educational, Scientific and Cultural Organization (UNESCO) in Paris.

Shortly after the invasion of the Israel Defense Forces (IDF) in the Lebanon war of June 1982 – which according to the Lebanese government killed some 1,200 Civilians and injured more than 2,000 Non-combatants in the Tyre area alone – the IDF set up a military post in the city and sponsored the return of Kazem al-Khalil. When his attempts to reconcile with the Amal Movement failed, he formed his own militia with Israeli support, recruiting mainly young Shiites from a poor background. However, the aging warlord's collaboration not only "discredited" and

"delegitimised him in the eyes of the Shi'a, but also earned him the anger of the Syrians. This simple miscalculation was an act from which he was never able to fully recover politically".

Meanwhile, his daughter Maha succeeded with her advocy to have the Tyre's cultural status recognized. In 1984, the city was finally recognised by UNESCO as a World Heritage Site. However, al-Khalil Chalabi deplored that her subsequent campaigns for the preservation of Tyrian sites were blocked by the Amal Movement, which took over power in the Tyre area after the 1985 withdrawal of the Israeli forces – particularly by its leader Nabih Berri and his wife Randa, who founded her own rival "National Association for the Protection of the Heritage of South Lebanon".

At the end of the 1980s, the al-Khalil suffered further setbacks: when Ahmad Chalabi's Amman-based Petra Bank collapsed in August 1989, Maha al-Khalil's husband Talal Chalabi was accused by Jordanian witnesses of benefiting financially from a US$200 miilion bank fraud committed by his brother. Ahmad Chalabi would later go on to provide the US and UK governments with false information that eventually led to their invasion of Iraq in 2003.

On 22 April 1990, the family patriarch Kazem died of a heart attack in Paris.

"He had been in excellent health and on Saturday presided over a meeting of Lebanese deputies living in Paris, the family said. He was found dead by one of his daughters about 4 a.m."

It was only in 2002 that al-Khalil Chalabi returned to Lebanon after 27 years in her Paris exile.

In 2013, al-Khalil Chalabi made international headlines as founder and president of the AIST: it launched an online raffle in association with Sotheby's to fund the Artisans’ village "Les Ateliers de Tyr" at the outskirts of the city. Participants could purchase tickets for 100 Euros to win the 1914 ‘Man with Opera Hat’ painting by Pablo Picasso. The proceeds totaled US$5.26 million. The painting was won by a 25-year-old fire-safety official from Pennsylvania.

In June 2015, al-Khalil Chalabi initiated a conference at the US Library of Congress about ancient Tyre. In February 2016, al-Khalil Chalabi was designated UNESCO Goodwill Ambassador – a celebrity advocate of UNESCO, not diplomatic ambassador – in recognition of her commitment to the "League of Canaanite, Phoenician and Punic Cities", which she founded in 2009. It includes the AIST and al-Khalil Chalabi's Fondation Tyr, which is based in the prestigious Avenue Foch in Paris, one of the most expensive addresses in the world.

In September 2017, al-Khalil opened "Les Ateliers" near Tyre in the middle of an orange orchard of 7,300 square meters.

== Awards ==
In 1986, al-Khalil Chalabi was named Knight of the National Order of Merit and Officer of the Order of Arts and Letters of the French Republic. In 1988 the Lebanese President Amine Gemayel named her an officer of the Natural Order of the Cedar.

In 2017, she received the Arab Woman of the Year award for achievement in culture.

== Works ==
- 1998: "Rapports Occident-Orient analysés à travers les récits de voyageurs à Tyr du XVIe au XIXe siècle", Publications de l'Université libanaise, Beyrouth
- 2008: "Art phénicien: expressions néo-phéniciennes", editions Georges Naef, Geneva.
