= 1958 Lebanese presidential election =

- 31 July 1958

66 members of the Parliament 44 votes needed to win
- Turnout: 84.85%
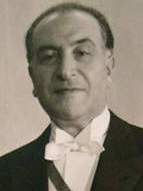

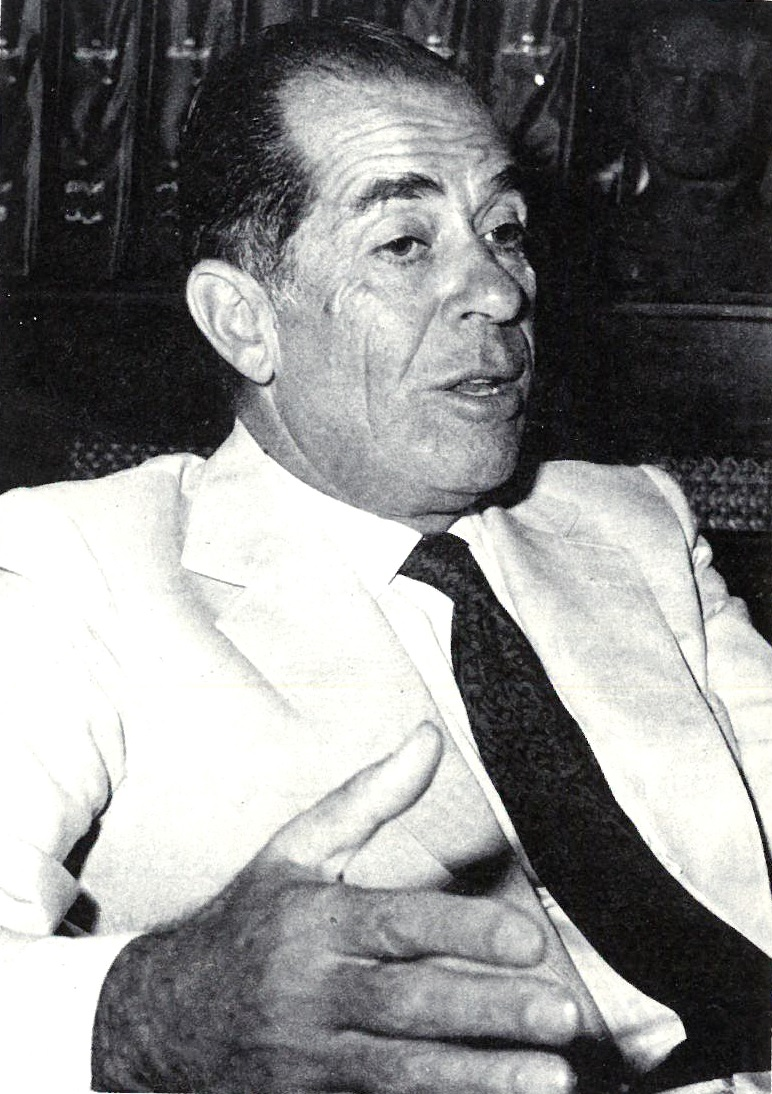
Nominee	Fouad Chehab	Raymond Eddé
Party	Chehabist	National Bloc
Electoral vote	48	7
Percentage	87.27%	12.73%
President before election
Camille Chamoun
National Liberal
Elected President
Fouad Chehab
Chehabist

An indirect presidential election was held in the Parliament of Lebanon in 1958 following the crisis. The Parliament of Lebanon elected the commander of the armed forces Fouad Chehab as the next president of Lebanon on 31 July 1958 to succeed Camille Chamoun. Chehab was elected on the second ballot in a 48–7 vote. He defeated Raymond Eddé.

== Background ==
The term of Camille Chamoun, the second president of Lebanon, would have expired on 24 September 1958. Chamoun announced that he would run for president again, which was not permitted in the Constitution of Lebanon. Around the same time, tensions between Maronite Christians and Arab Muslims began to rise after the killing of Nasib Metni, the editor of Al Telegraf, who had been critical of Chamoun's rule. An armed rebellion began on 10 May 1958. The United Arab Republic (UAR) soon became involved in the region and its leader, Gamal Abdul Nasser, began publicly calling for Arab unity. Various nations, including Lebanon, blamed Nasser's actions for the increase in sectarian unrest, and the Lebanese government filed a formal complaint to the United Nations Security Council (UNSC) on 22 May 1958, accusing the UAR of meddling in the nation's affairs.

After various discussions, the UNSC passed a resolution on 11 June 1958 that recommended sending a group to Lebanon "to ensure that there is no illegal infiltration of personnel or supply of arms or other material across the Lebanese borders". A "Group of Three"—Galo Plaza, Rajeshwar Dayal, and Odd Bull—Dag Hammarskjöld, the Secretary-General of the United Nations, and members of the United Nations Truce Supervision Organization were soon dispatched to Lebanon. The observers were criticized as ineffective, and members of the United States Marine Corps, backed up by the United States Sixth Fleet, were sent into Lebanon on 15 July 1958. Two days later, British forces arrived in the region. By the time of the election, there were 10,000 American troops in Lebanon.

== Results ==
The President of Lebanon is elected by the Parliament of Lebanon. In the lead up to the election, parliament was divided into factions, namely those who supported western nations and Chamoun and those favoring Nasser and the United Arab Republic. Chehab was viewed as a compromise candidate; he was not interested in the presidency until "it became clear that he was the only candidate who had any hope of wide acceptance." As a result, he consented to be nominated on 28 July, only three days before the election.

The election was held on 31 July 1958, and members of parliament voted between two candidates: the commander of the armed forces Fouad Chehab and head of the National Bloc Raymond Eddé. Voting began at 11:34 a.m., and on the first ballot Eddé got ten votes and Chehab forty-three—he would have won with a 2/3 majority, or forty-four votes. Although the second ballot only required a simple majority vote, Chehab was elected in a 48–7 vote with one abstention. Though there were sixty-six members of parliament, ten were not present at voting, including Sami as-Solh, the Prime Minister of Lebanon, who felt that an election should not be held until Lebanon was at peace.

Candidate	Votes	%
Fouad Chehab	48	87.27
Raymond Eddé	7	12.73
Total	55	100.00
Blank votes	1	1.79
Total votes	56	–
Registered voters/turnout	66	84.85

== Aftermath ==
Eddé conceded after the election's results were announced. On 4 August, Chehab announced that he would work towards unity and stability in Lebanon and that the foremost of his aims "is the withdrawal of foreign troops." Chehab was elected to a six-year term and took office on 23 September. The capital city of Beirut was patrolled by numerous troops and placed under a lockdown for all of the 23rd as Chehab was sworn in at 10:58 a.m.
