= Edde =

Edde or EDDE can refer to:

- Edde (surname)
- Edde, Hungary, a village in Somogy county, Hungary
- Edde, Lebanon, a village located 45 km north of Beirut, Lebanon
- The ICAO airport code for Erfurt–Weimar Airport in Germany

== See also ==
- Eddé (disambiguation)
