= Tripartite Alliance (disambiguation) =

The Tripartite Alliance is a political coalition in South Africa.

Tripartite Alliance may also refer to:

- Tripartite Alliance (France), an alliance in post-World War II France
- Tripartite Alliance (Lebanon), a 1968 alliance of right-wing Christian parties in Lebanon
