= Khalil Khalil =

Lebanese lawyer and diplomat (born 1941)

Ambassador of Lebanon to Turkey
- In office 1991–1994

Ambassador of Lebanon to the Netherland
- In office September 1985 – 1990

Ambassador of Lebanon to West Germany
- In office October 1978 – July 1983

Ambassador of Lebanon to Iran
- In office September 1971 – September 1978

Personal details
- Born: Khalil Kazem Khalil; 8 February 1941 (age 85) Tyre, Lebanon
- Education: American University of Beirut

Khalil Khalil (born 8 February 1941) is a Lebanese barrister and former diplomat who served as the ambassador of Lebanon in various countries from 1971 to 1994.

== Early life and education ==
Khalil was born in Tyre on 8 February 1941. He hails from a Shiite family. His parents are Kazem Khalil, a politician, and Mouzayan Haidar.

Khalil received a degree in law from the American University of Beirut.

== Career ==
Following his graduation Khalil worked as a barrister. Then he joined the Ministry of Foreign Affairs. His first diplomatic post was the ambassador of Lebanon to Iran which he held between September 1971 and September 1978. He was named as the ambassador of Lebanon to the Federal Republic of Germany in October 1978 and remained in office until July 1983. He was the director general of legal affairs department at the Ministry of Foreign Affairs between 1983 and 1985. He was the ambassador of Lebanon to the Netherlands from September 1985 to 1990. Next he was appointed ambassador of Lebanon to Turkey in 1991 which he held until 1994. He resigned from diplomatic post on 21 June 1996.

=== Activities ===
During his diplomatic post in Iran Khalil closely worked with Shah Mohammad Reza Pahlavi. One of their collaborative activities was to curtail the popularity of Musa Al Sadr, a powerful Lebanese Shia figure. Khalil's family was not on good terms with Musa Al Sadr due to the conflicts between Al Sadr and Nasser Khalil, brother of Khalil Khalil. Khalil was also close to the Iranian politician Asadollah Alam.

Khalil is among the signatories of a document protesting the sectarian approach of two Shia political groups, Amal and Hezbollah. The document was issued on 9 June 2020.
