= Charles Helou =

President of Lebanon from 1964 to 1970

His Excellency Charles Helou OM ONC
- شارل حلو
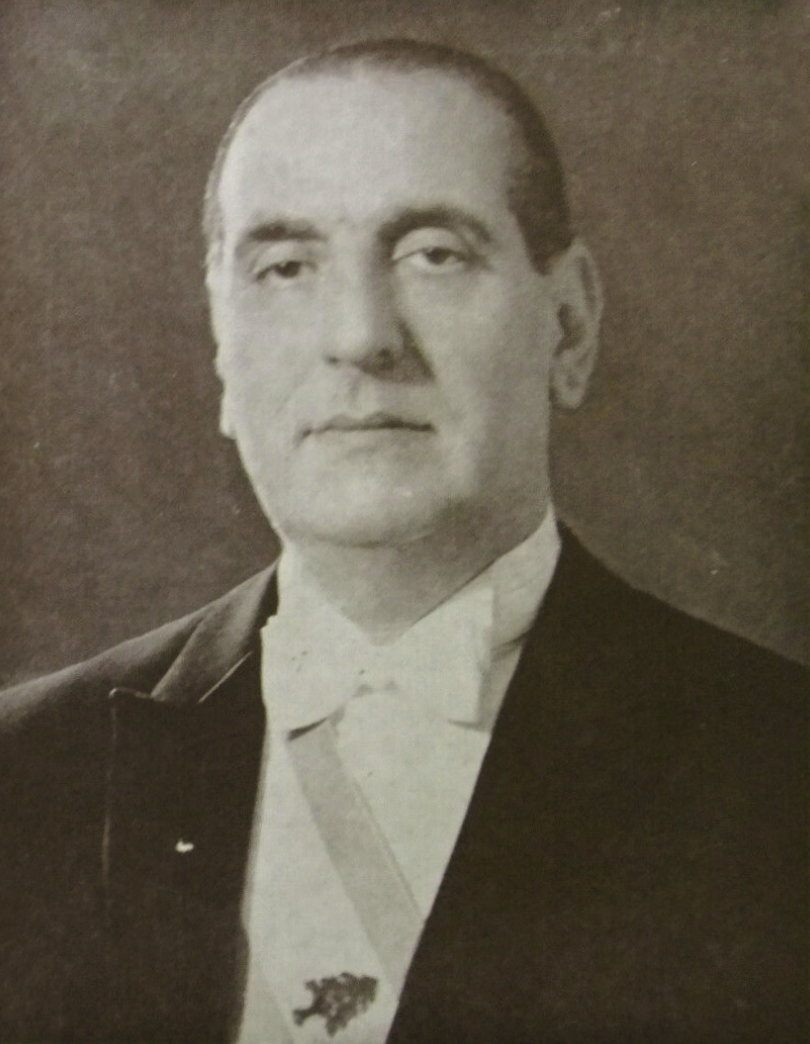
- Official portrait, 1964

4th President of Lebanon
- In office 23 September 1964 – 22 September 1970
- Prime Minister: Hussein Al Oweini; Rashid Karami; Abdallah El-Yafi
- Preceded by: Fuad Chehab
- Succeeded by: Suleiman Frangieh

Personal details
- Born: 25 September 1913 Beirut, Ottoman Empire
- Died: 7 January 2001 (aged 87) Beirut, Lebanon
- Spouse: Nina Helou (m. 1952; died 1989)
- Education: Saint Joseph University
- Profession: Diplomat, politician
- Religion: Maronite

Charles Helou (Note: Arabic: شارل الحلو) (25 September 1913 – 7 January 2001) was a Lebanese politician who served as the 4th president of Lebanon from 1964 to 1970.

== Early life and education ==
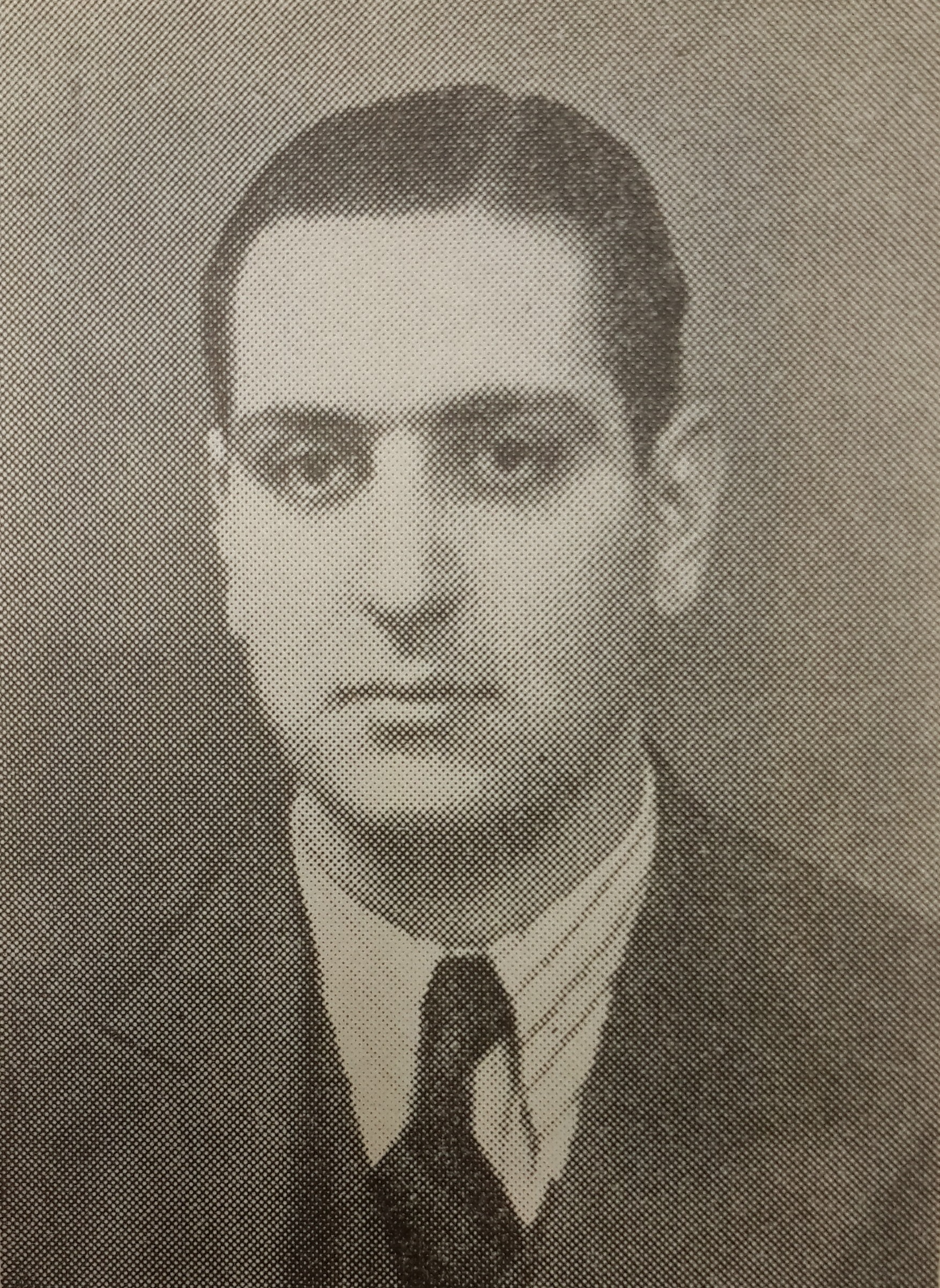
Early image of Helou in the 1940s

Born in Beirut on 25 September 1913, Helou was the scion of a powerful Maronite family from Baabda. He graduated with honours from St. Joseph's University in Beirut in 1929, and went on to complete a law degree in 1934. Helou worked in his early years as a journalist at the French language newspaper L'Eclair du Nord. He was also at one time the political editor of Le Jour, a French daily newspaper owned by his close friend Michel Chiha. In 1936, he made his first foray into politics, when he joined with Pierre Gemayel and three others in launching the Kataeb (Phalangist) Party. Differences with Gemayel later led Helou to quit the party.

== Career ==
Helou's first governmental appointment was as ambassador to the Vatican in 1947. In 1949 he took part in the Israel/Lebanese armistice negotiations where Israel tried to gain diplomatic concessions in exchange for the Israeli withdrawal from Lebanese Sovereign territory. He later served in the Cabinet as minister of justice and health (1954–1955) and as minister of education (1964). Initially, Helou's lack of political affiliation gave him the appearance of a leader able to unite Lebanon and he was chosen to succeed Fuad Chehab as president by the National Assembly in 1964.

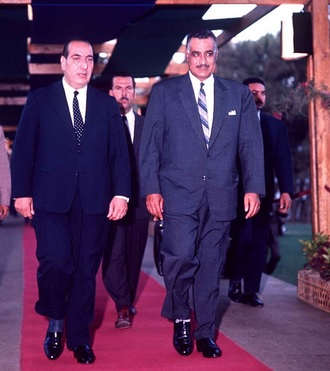
Helou (left) with Egyptian President Gamal Abdel Nasser during the 1964 Arab League summit in Alexandria

The alliance between Chehab and Lebanese prime minister Rashid Karami, a staunch Arab nationalist, soon left Karami in effective control of the Lebanese government. Helou founded and launched the Institute for Palestine Studies in 1963. The most pressing issue that was first to cause problems for Helou was the Israeli diversion of the Jordan River.

The impressive economic growth that characterized Helou's presidency translated into a cultural and lifestyle belle époque in Lebanon (perhaps this gained the name for Beirut as the 'Paris of the Orient' and Lebanon as the 'Switzerland of the East') was due to the efforts launched by the former President Chehab. However this period was also partly marred by the Intra Bank crisis of 1966 and Lebanon's increasing inability to avoid involvement in the Arab–Israeli conflict. The Six-Day War of 1967, strained sectarian relations in Lebanon. Many Muslims wanted Lebanon to join the Arab war effort, while many Christians wished to eschew participation. Helou managed to keep Lebanon from entanglement, apart from a brief air strike, but found it impossible to put the lid on the tensions that had been raised. Parliamentary elections in 1968 revealed an increasing polarization in the country, with two major coalitions, one pro-Arab Nationalism, led by Rashid Karami and the other pro-Western, led jointly by former President Camille Chamoun, Pierre Gemayel and Raymond Eddé, both made major gains and won 30 of the 99 seats each.

In addition, government authority was challenged by the presence of armed Palestinian guerrillas in the south of the country, and clashes between the Lebanese army and the Palestine Liberation Organization (PLO) became increasingly frequent. For a long time, Helou resisted their demands, but in 1969, after failing to end the rebellion militarily, he finally gave in, hoping that the Palestinian guerrillas would confine their operations to cross-border attacks against Israel and would stop challenging the Lebanese government. As it turned out, the clashes only intensified.

In 1970, Helou endorsed Elias Sarkis as his chosen successor, but the latter lost the election in the National Assembly by one vote to Suleiman Frangieh. Unlike other former presidents, who remained politically active after retirement, Helou faded from the scene. He was involved in a philanthropic venture, founding a number of restaurants to provide free hot meals to elderly people.

== Personal life ==
In 1952, he married Nina Trad, niece of Petro Trad, who served as President of the French Mandate of Lebanon and under whom he had studied law. Trad was one of the first women lawyers in Lebanon.

== Death ==
Helou died of a heart attack on 7 January 2001. He was 87.

== See also ==
- List of presidents of Lebanon

== Notes ==
Preceded by Fuad Chehab	President of Lebanon; 1964–1970	Succeeded by Suleiman Frangieh
