= 1 Picasso for 100 Euros =

French fundraising initiative

1 Picasso for 100 Euros (1 Picasso pour 100 euros) funds charitable projects by hosting raffles where the prize is a painting by Pablo Picasso.

== History ==
The raffle was founded by French journalist and television producer Péri Cochin, who wanted to create a raffle to help fund projects by the International Association to Save Tyre in Lebanon. Cochin contacted Olivier Picasso, a grandson of Pablo Picasso, to search for a usable painting. The two found the painting L'Homme au Gibus (Man with Opera Hat) and then waited two years before the French government granted them permission to run the raffle.

The first raffle, held in coordination with the Picasso estate and administration, occurred on 18 December 2013, at Sotheby's in Paris. It was expected to give the charity €4,000,000 in gross profit. 50,000 tickets were issued, then the maximum under French law, at €100 (US$135 as of 2013) each. The winner was an American, Jeffrey Gonano, who bought a ticket as he wanted a picture to hang on his wall. The Carnegie Museum of Art accepted the painting on his behalf and sent it to Christie's in Manhattan, where it remains as of April 2026.

After a delay due to the COVID-19 pandemic, the second raffle was held on 20 May 2020. More than 51,000 tickets were sold, with €4.2 million raised for CARE International to fund clean-water projects in Cameroon, Madagascar and Morocco. It was organized by Aider les Autres, who wanted to make the raffle a yearly event. The painting, Nature morte, was won by Claudia Borgogno, an Italian accountant whose son bought her a ticket.

The third raffle was held on 14 April 2026 to raise funds for Fondation Recherche Alzheimer, a French organization for Alzheimer's disease research. The raffle sold all 120,000 of its tickets, raising €11 million. The painting, Tête de femme, was won by Ari Hodara, a software salesman from Paris who had bought two tickets.
