= President of Lebanon =

Head of state

President of the Lebanese Republic
- رئيس الجمهورية اللبنانية (Arabic)
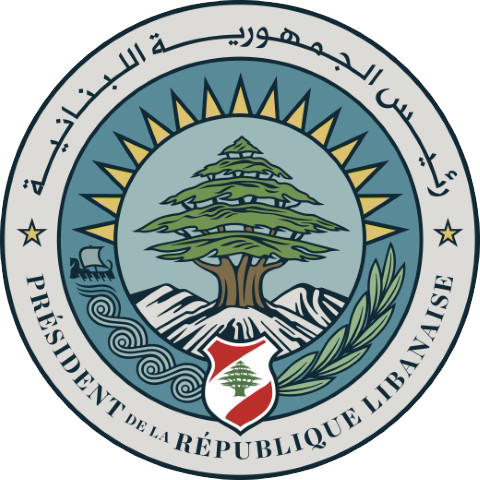
- Presidential Seal

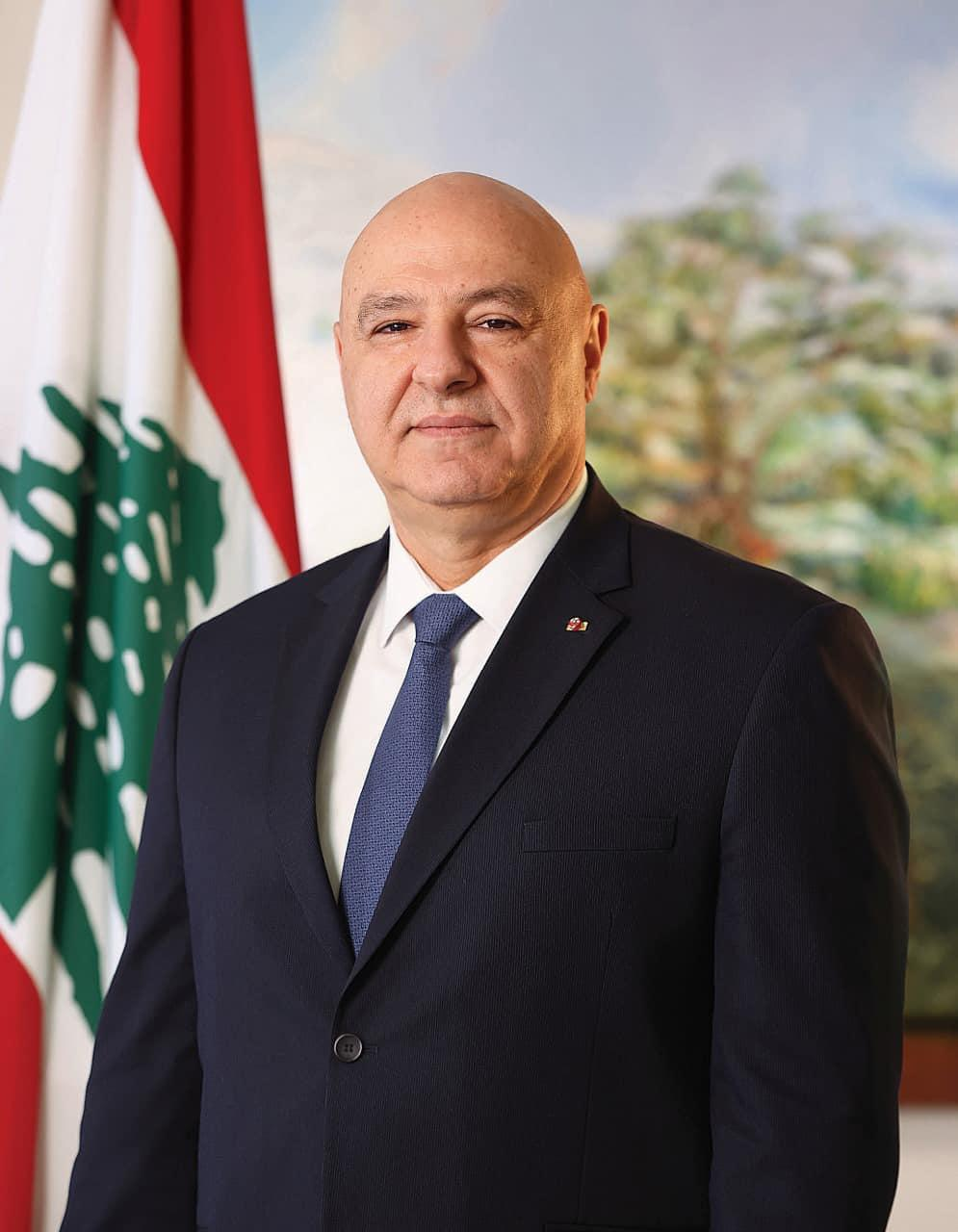
- Incumbent; Joseph Aoun since 9 January 2025
- Style: His Excellency
- Type: Head of state
- Residence: Baabda Palace; Beiteddine Palace (summer)
- Appointer: Parliament
- Term length: Six years, non-renewable immediately but renewable non-consecutively
- Constituting instrument: Constitution of Lebanon (1926)
- Formation: 1 September 1926; 100 years ago
- First holder: Charles Debbas
- Salary: £L 13,460,205,000 annually or $ 150,000 annually
- Website: Official website

The president of the Lebanese Republic (Arabic: رئيس الجمهورية اللبنانية, romanized: Ra’īs al-Jumhūriyyah al-Lubnāniyyah) is the head of state of Lebanon. The president is elected by the parliament for a term of six years, which cannot be renewed immediately because they can only be renewed non-consecutively. By convention, the president is always a Maronite Christian who fulfills the same requirements as a candidate for the house of representatives, as per article 49 of the Lebanese constitution.

The current holder is Joseph Aoun, who took office on 9 January 2025.

== History ==
=== French mandate ===
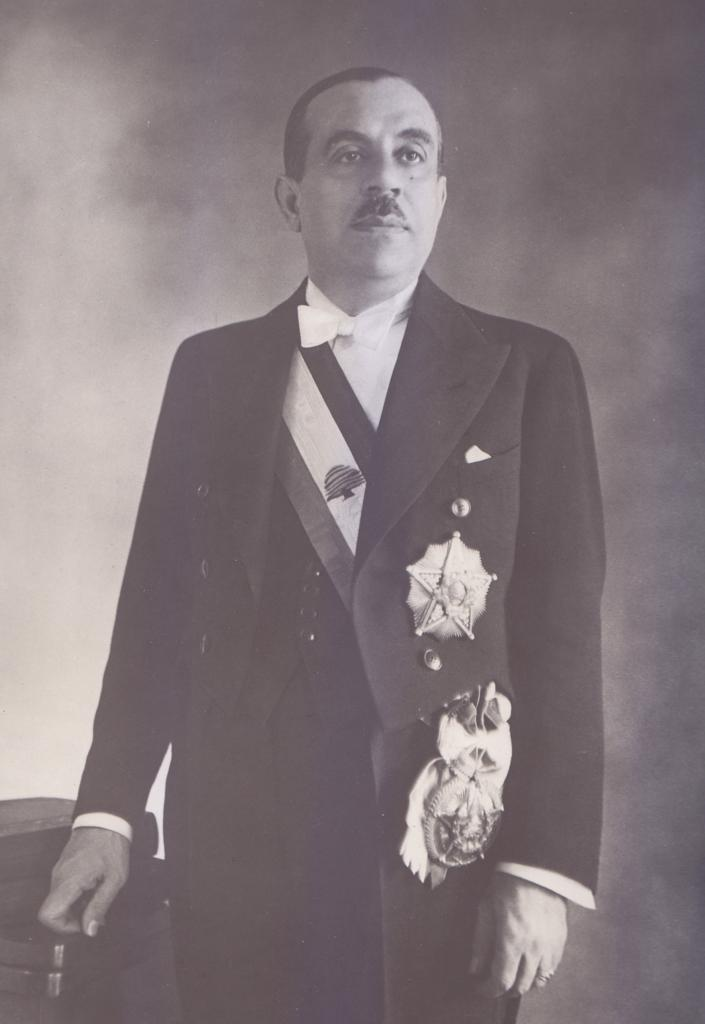
Official portrait of Émile Eddé during the French mandate

The first Lebanese constitution was promulgated on 23 May 1926, and subsequently amended several times. Modeled after that of the French Third Republic, it provided for a bicameral parliament with Chamber of Deputies and a Senate (although the latter was eventually dropped), a president, and a Council of Ministers, or cabinet. The president was to be elected by the Chamber of Deputies for one six-year term and could not be reelected until a six-year period had elapsed; deputies were to be popularly elected along confessional lines.

A custom of selecting major political officers, as well as top ranks within the public administration, according to the proportion of the principal sects in the population was strengthened during this period. Thus, for example, the president ought to be a Maronite Christian, the prime minister a Sunni Muslim, and the speaker of the Chamber of Deputies a Shia Muslim. A Greek Orthodox and a Druze would always be present in the cabinet. This practice increased sectarian tension by providing excessive power to the Maronite president (such as the ability to choose the prime minister), and hindered the formation of a Lebanese national identity. Under the Constitution, the French high commissioner still exercised supreme power, an arrangement that initially brought objections from the Lebanese nationalists. Nevertheless, Charles Debbas, a Greek Orthodox, was elected the first president of Lebanon three days after the adoption of the Constitution.

At the end of Debbas's first term in 1932, Bishara al-Khuri and Émile Eddé competed for the office of president, thus dividing the Chamber of Deputies. To break the deadlock, some deputies suggested Shaykh Muhammad al Jisr, who was chairman of the Council of Ministers and the Muslim leader of Tripoli, as a compromise candidate. However, French high commissioner Henri Ponsot suspended the constitution on 9 May 1932, and extended the term of Debbas for one year; in this way he prevented the election of a Muslim as president. Dissatisfied with Ponsot's conduct, the French authorities replaced him with Count Damien de Martel, who, on 30 January 1934, appointed Habib Pacha Es-Saad as president for a one-year term (later extended for an additional year).

Émile Eddé was elected president on 30 January 1936. A year later, he partially reestablished the Constitution of 1926 and proceeded to hold elections for the Chamber of Deputies. However, the Constitution was again suspended by the French high commissioner in September 1939, at the outbreak of World War II.

During World War II when the Vichy government assumed power over French territory in 1940, General Henri Fernand Dentz was appointed as high commissioner of Lebanon. This new turning point led to the resignation of Lebanese president Émile Eddé on 4 April 1941. After five days, Dentz appointed Alfred Naqqache for a presidency period that lasted only three months. The Vichy authorities allowed Nazi Germany to move aircraft and supplies through Syria to Iraq where they were used against British forces. Britain, fearing that Nazi Germany would gain full control of Lebanon and Syria by pressure on the weak Vichy government, sent its army into Syria and Lebanon.

After the fighting ended in Lebanon, General Charles de Gaulle visited the area. Under various political pressures from both inside and outside Lebanon, de Gaulle decided to recognize the independence of Lebanon. On 26 November 1941, General Georges Catroux announced that Lebanon would become independent under the authority of the Free French government.

Elections were held in 1943 and on 8 November 1943, the new Lebanese government unilaterally abolished the mandate. The French reacted by throwing the new government into prison. The High Commissioner installed Eddé as president. Ten days later, however, under pressure from France's Allies in World War II, the French removed Eddé from office and restored the government of Bechara El Khoury on 21 November. Parliamentary elections were held in May 1947 but many protested claiming that it was rigged deeming the parliament as illegitimated. However El Khoury was then also re-elected in 1948. El-Khoury faced significant opposition from traditional Za'im leaders on whose powers his policies were beginning to impinge. In 1951 an alliance was formed between Camille Chamoun, Pierre Gemayel, Raymond Eddé, Kamal Jumblatt, Phalange and Syrian National Party. On 18 September 1952, amidst widespread demonstrations, El Khoury was forced into resigning.

=== Post-Independence ===
In 1952, Fouad Chehab refused to allow the army to interfere in the uprising that forced Lebanese president Bechara El Khoury to resign. Chehab became the prime minister of Lebanon in September 1952, and hold the additional portfolio of defense minister. Chehab was then appointed president with the duty to ensure an emergency democratic presidential election. Four days later, Camille Chamoun was elected to succeed El Khoury. During Chamoun's presidency, Lebanon experienced an economic boom, in particular in the construction, banking and tourism sectors. He implemented a 1954 law on the creation of joint-stock companies and a 1956 law on banking secrecy. According to Fawwaz Traboulsi, Chamoun concentrated power into his hands, blurring the limits of democracy and autocracy.

In 1958, President Camille Chamoun was forced to resign after he attempted to amend the constitution to allow for his reelection. Pan-Arabists and other groups backed by Gamal Abdel Nasser, with considerable support in Lebanon's Muslim (particularly Sunni) community attempted to overthrow Chamoun's government in June 1958. Clashes then ensued between Sunni Arab Nationalists and pro-government Christians. This led to American intervention with Operation Blue Bat on 15 July 1958 by President Dwight D. Eisenhower in the first application of the Eisenhower Doctrine in which the US announced that it would intervene to protect regimes that it considered to be threatened by international communism.

The president of Lebanon is elected by the Parliament of Lebanon. In the lead up to the election, parliament was divided into factions, namely those who supported western nations and Chamoun and those favoring Nasser and the United Arab Republic. Chehab was viewed as a compromise candidate; he was not interested in the presidency until "it became clear that he was the only candidate who had any hope of wide acceptance." As a result, he consented to be nominated on 28 July, only three days before the election. Following a path of moderation and co-operating closely with the various religious groups, and with both secular and religious forces, Chehab was able to cool tensions and bring stability back to the nation. His ideology inspired the presidencies of two other presidents.

Charles Helou was then elected as the 4th president in 1964. Helou's lack of political affiliation gave him the appearance of a leader able to unite Lebanon and he was chosen to succeed Fuad Chehab as president by the National Assembly. The Six-Day War of 1967, strained sectarian relations in Lebanon. Many Muslims wanted Lebanon to join the Arab war effort, while many Christians wished to eschew participation. Helou managed to keep Lebanon from entanglement, apart from a brief air strike, but found it impossible to put the lid on the tensions that had been raised. Parliamentary elections in 1968 revealed an increasing polarization in the country, with two major coalitions, one pro-Arab Nationalism, led by Rashid Karami and the other pro-Western, led jointly by former president Camille Chamoun, Pierre Gemayel and Raymond Eddé, both made major gains and won 30 of the 99 seats each.

In addition, government authority was challenged by the presence of armed Palestinian guerrillas in the south of the country, and clashes between the Lebanese army and the Palestine Liberation Organization (PLO) became increasingly frequent. For a long time, Helou resisted their demands, but in 1969, after failing to end the rebellion militarily, he finally gave in, hoping that the Palestinian guerrillas would confine their operations to cross-border attacks against Israel and would stop challenging the Lebanese government. As it turned out, the clashes only intensified.

In 1970, Helou endorsed Elias Sarkis as his chosen successor, but the latter lost the election in the National Assembly by one vote to Suleiman Frangieh.

=== Civil War ===
Civil war in Lebanon began on 13 April 1975. Frangieh as the Lebanese President declared the Constitutional Document on 14 February 1976 that was the first serious initiative to end the conflict and reach a consensus. The document empowered prime minister and suggested a "parity between Christians and Muslims in Parliament", reducing the power of Maronites. Although it was supported by major politicians and religious leaders, it could not achieve its objectives.

Élias Sarkis, the Chehabist nominee in the 1970 election - who lost the vote by a margin of only 1 vote - was elected on the second round of voting with 66% of the votes. He was the only person to receive a vote during the election, all other ballots containing blank votes. Almost a third of MPs were absent from the parliamentary session. As outgoing President Frangieh's term expired on 23 September of that year, he was therefore sworn on multiple months after the election. It was hoped that Sarkis would be able to unite the warring factions and end the emerging civil war; by September 1976, however, the situation had grown past the government's control as Syria and other countries began interfering and complicating the situation. On 5 March 1980, Sarkis developed his policy as part of his attempts to create national accord: unity, independence, parliamentarian democracy, rejecting the Camp David Accords between Egypt and Israel.

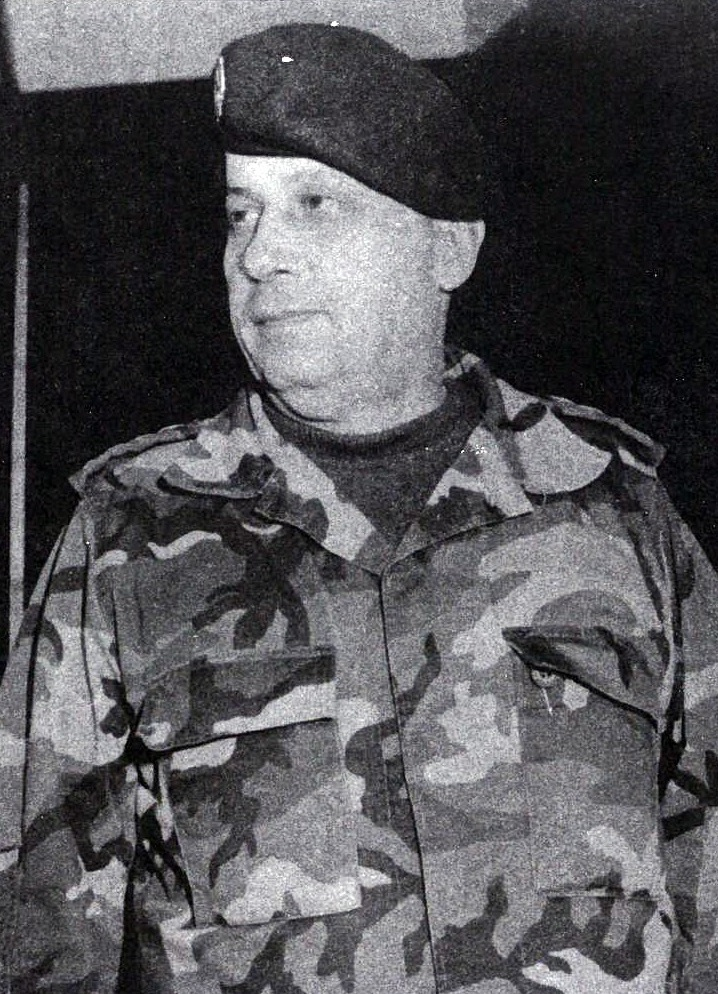
Michel Aoun in his military uniform in 1988

During the peaks of the civil war, an election was held in the Parliament of Lebanon on 23 August 1982, resulting in Lebanese Forces leader Bachir Gemayel being elected President of the Lebanese Republic after being the sole contender. He was the youngest president to be elected. He notably has close relations with Israel, which lead to his assassination in an explosion that killed more than thirty people by SSNP member Habib Shartouni. He was assassinated before officially taking office. He was succeeded by his brother Amine Gemayel. On 22 September 1988, 15 minutes before the expiration of his term, the outgoing president Amine Gemayel appointed Aoun as Prime Minister notwithstanding the tradition of reserving it for a Sunni Muslim, heading a military government to be formed by six members of the Martial Court, three of which are Christian and three are Muslims. He also dismissed the civilian administration of acting Prime Minister Selim Hoss. The Muslims refused to serve, and submitted their resignations on the next day. Gemayel accuses Syria of forcing them to do so, claiming that they accepted their roles when he contacted them. The two ended up heading rival administrations; with Aoun occupying the presidential palace at Baabda, al-Huss established his own office in Muslim-dominated West Beirut. In 1990, the civil war ended when Aoun was forced to surrender following an attack on the presidential palace by Syrian and Lebanese military forces. Al-Huss subsequently resigned as prime minister, in favour of Omar Karami.

=== Post-Civil War ===
Following the Taif Agreement to end the civil war, the National Assembly met on 5 November 1989 at the Qoleiat air base in North Lebanon and elected Moawad as President of Lebanon. The post had been vacant since the expiration of Amine Gemayel’s term in 1988. The National Assembly had failed to elect a successor at that time. Seventeen days after being elected, as he was returning from Lebanon's Independence Day celebrations on November 22, 1989, a 250 kg car bomb was detonated next to Moawad's motorcade in West Beirut, killing him and 23 others. Presidential powers were handed over to the cabinet for two days until Hrawi was elected at the Park Hotel in Chtoura by 47 out of 53 members of parliament on 24 November 1989. Since Baabda Palace, the president's residence, was destroyed and bombed by Syrian troops in October 1990 to drive out General Michel Aoun, Hrawi lived in future prime minister Rafik Hariri's Beirut apartment.

Emile Lahoud then ran for the presidency in 1998 after having the constitution amended to allow the army commander-in-chief to run for office. This amendment is believed to have been backed by Syria. His presidency was secured following the receipt of 118 votes from the 128-member Lebanese Parliament. When he became Lebanon's president in 1998, he aligned himself with Hezbollah, and picked his own man as prime minister, Selim al-Hoss. This led to heightened tensions between Rafiq Hariri and Lahoud. During his term, he exerted more control over government decision-making than Prime Minister Rafiq Hariri or Parliament Speaker Nabih Berri. In 2007, his presidential term ended. However, a new president was not immediately elected. Following a political deadlock which lasted for six months, the Lebanese parliament elected former army chief Michel Suleiman as president.

=== Today ===
From the expiration of the term of President Michel Suleiman in May 2014 until 31 October 2016, the parliament was unable to obtain the majority required to elect a president, and the office was vacant for almost two and a half years with more than 30 votes being held. Following the Maarab Agreement which led to rival Samir Geagea's withdrawal and endorsement, Michel Aoun was elected as president, serving until 30 October 2022. Upon the expiration of Michel Aoun's term parliament was unsuccessful to elect a successor. However on 9 January 2025 Joseph Aoun was finally inaugurated as president.

== Office ==
=== Qualifications ===
The constitution requires the president hold the same qualifications as a member of Parliament (also called the Chamber of Deputies), which are Lebanese citizenship and attainment of the age of twenty-one years.

Though not specifically stated in the constitution, an understanding known as the National Pact, agreed in 1943, customarily limits the office to members of the Maronite Christian community. This is based on a gentlemen's agreement between Lebanon's Maronite Christian president Bechara El Khoury and his Sunni Muslim prime minister Riad Al Solh, which was reached in 1943, when Lebanon became independent of France, and described that the president of the Republic was to be a Maronite Christian, the prime minister a Sunni Muslim, and the speaker of Parliament a Shia Muslim.

Article 50 of the constitution of Lebanon requires the president to take an oath upon assuming office, which is prescribed thus:

I swear by Almighty God to observe the Constitution and the laws of the Lebanese Nation and to maintain the independence of Lebanon and its territorial integrity.

== Role and responsibilities ==
Lebanon being a parliamentary republic, the President is essentially the repository of reserve powers and the office is largely symbolic. Nevertheless, he is an important member of the executive who shares many powers with the Council of Ministers.

As per the constitution, the President

- is the commander-in-chief of the Lebanese Armed Forces which are under the authority of the Council of Ministers (thus making this role of the President largely symbolic) (Art. 49);
- promulgates laws passed by Parliament (Art. 51);
- negotiates and ratifies international treaties in agreement with the prime minister and the Council of Ministers and, in the case of some treaties, with the approval of Parliament (Art. 52);
- appoints after consultations with the Speaker of Parliament and with Parliament the prime minister-designate who is tasked with forming a government (Art. 53);
- once the prime minister-designate has won a vote of confidence from Parliament, formally appoints the prime minister (Art. 53);
- may ask the Council of Ministers to dissolve Parliament (Art. 55);
- may ask Parliament to reconsider laws (Art. 57);
- may, with the consent of the Council of Ministers, issue "emergency" legislation by decree (Art. 58).
- may fire an individual minister after confirmation by 2/3 of the cabinet and the signature of the PM.(Art. 69).

The President's powers have been reduced in 1990 under Ta'if, while the powers of the Council of Ministers were increased. Previously, the President only needed the "favourable advice" of his ministers.

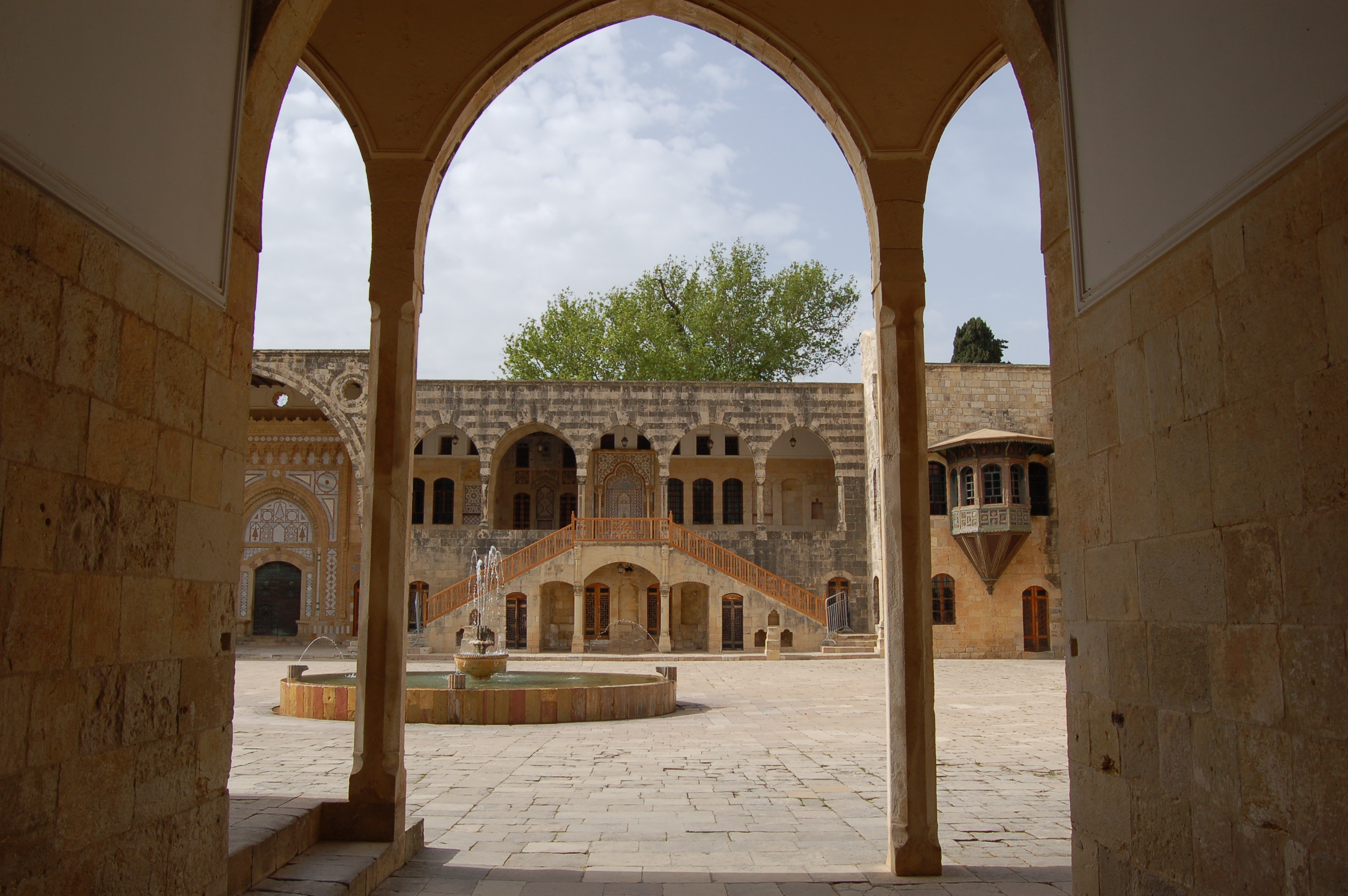
Beiteddine Palace is the official summer residence of the president

The Presidential Residence was first located in Beirut and then moved to Sin el-Fil and Jounieh. In 1960s the residence was moved to the Baabda Palace after its construction, located southeast of Beirut, where Charles Helou was the first to serve in. In 1943 the Beittedinne Palace was declared as the official summer residence of the president.

=== Official state car ===
The president's car is a W221 Mercedes-Benz S 600 Guard armoured limousine and it is escorted by the Republican Guard's SUVs and other security vehicles including the preceding official state car, an armoured W140 S 600 now possibly used as a backup limo.

== Election and vacancy ==
Thirty to sixty days before the expiration of a president's term, the speaker of the Chamber of Deputies calls for a special session to elect a new president, which selects a candidate for a six-year term on a secret ballot in which a two-thirds majority is required to elect. If no candidate receives a two-thirds majority, a second ballot is held in which only a majority is required to elect. An individual cannot be reelected president until six years have passed from the expiration of his or her first term.

=== Quorum for an election ===
The Constitution is silent on the issue of the quorum needed to call to order a parliamentary presidential electoral meeting. In the absence of a clear provision designating the quorum needed to elect the president, the constitution is open to differing interpretations. According to one view on the issue, a quorum constituting a majority of fifty-percent plus one (that required for any meeting of Parliament) is sufficient for a parliamentary presidential electoral meeting. Another view on the issue argues that the quorum is a two-thirds majority of the total members of Parliament as Article 49 of the constitution requires a two-thirds voting majority to elect the president in the first round and, if the quorum were half plus one, there would have been no need to require the two-thirds voting majority when the number of deputies present at the meeting does not exceed the quorum.

=== Vacancy ===
A recurrent theme in Lebanese politics is the vacancy in the Lebanese presidency which has occurred for three consecutive times; no Lebanese president has directly transferred power to a successor without vacancy since Elias Hrawi was succeeded by Emile Lahoud in 1998. Unlike several other countries, the Lebanese constitution does not mention an "interim/acting" president. The constitution specifically states that the post of the presidency remains vacant, and some powers of the presidency are transferred to the council of ministers. Article 62 in the Lebanese constitution specifically states this: "Should there be a vacancy in the Presidency for any reason whatsoever, the Council of Ministers shall exercise the authorities of the President by delegation." After Michel Aoun left the presidency in 2022 to vacancy, former prime minister Najib Mikati said that he did not personally assume the powers of the presidency, as they will be delegated to the council of ministers as a whole.

== See also ==
- List of presidents of Lebanon
- Prime Minister of Lebanon
- Legislative Speaker of Lebanon
