= Tripartite Alliance (Lebanon) =

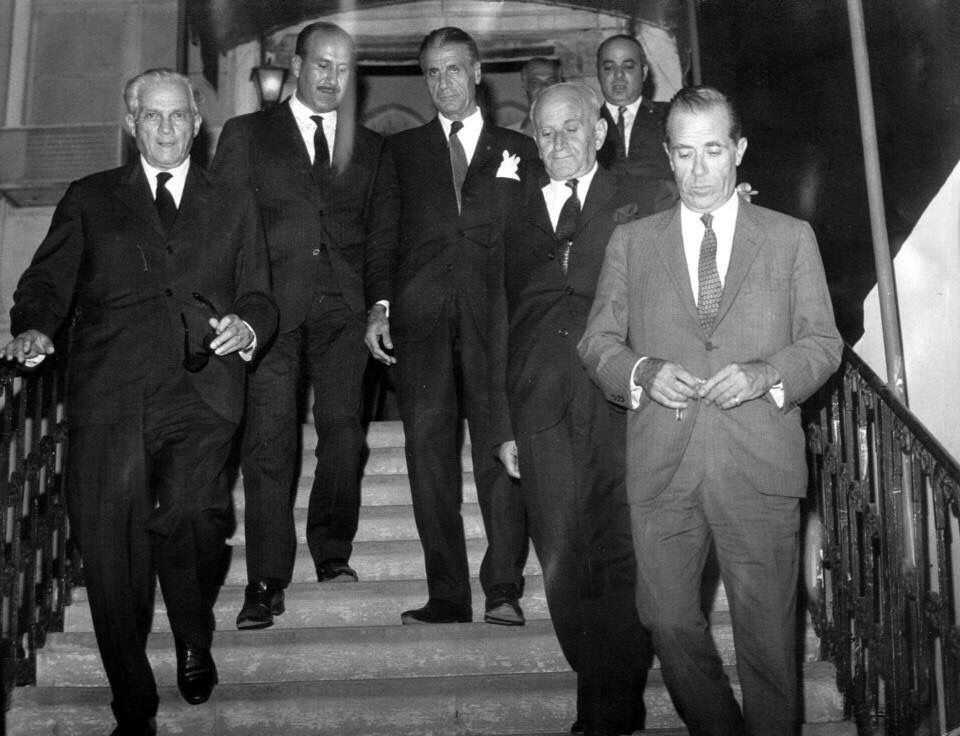
Leaders of the alliance. From Left to right: Camille Chamoun, Michel Sassin, Pierre Gemayel, Kazem El-Khalil, Edmond Rizk and Raymond Edde

The Helf Alliance or Tripartite Alliance (Arabic: الحلف الثلاثي; Al-Hilf al-thulathi), was a right-wing coalition formed in 1968 by the big three mainly Christian parties in Lebanon: The Pierre Gemayel's Kataeb, the National Liberal Party of former President Camille Chamoun, and National Bloc of Raymond Eddé. The coalition called for a Lebanese Nationalism as Regional and internal tensions rise, and as relations with PLO spoils. It was also seen as a counter-force against the Arabist line incarnated during his mandate by President Fuad Chehab. The alliance well-performed in 1968 Parliamentary elections winning 30 seats in the 99 member National Assembly - the best result until 2005 elections for any organized electoral force in Lebanon's notoriously fractured legislature. In 1969, the National Bloc left the alliance over a disagreement about the Cairo Agreement. The Kataeb and the NLP, still close allies, went on to form the Lebanese Front in 1976 while expanding their Christian canton amidst the Lebanese Civil War.

== Formation ==
The idea of the alliance came at a meeting on March 23, 1967, at the home of the secretary-general of the National Liberal Party, Kazem al-Khalil, and was officially announced on February 22, 1968, prior to the Lebanese parliamentary elections scheduled for the following March 24.

It was agreed that, amongst the three parties, they hold responsibilities; which include:

- The Kataeb Party, headed by Pierre Gemayel, chooses the alliance's candidates in the Beirut I electoral District.
- The National Liberal Party (NLP) chooses the alliance's candidates in the Chouf district, headed by Camille Chamoun.
- The National Bloc party chooses the alliance's candidates in the Byblos district, headed by Raymond Edde.
