= Carlos Eddé =

Lebanese politician

Carlos Eddé (Arabic: كارلوس إدة; born in 1956) is a Lebanese politician. He was the honorary president of Lebanese National Bloc.

In 2000, he succeeded his uncle Raymond Eddé as leader of the Lebanese National Bloc party ("Al-Amid" meaning 'The Dean' in Arabic).

He received his bachelor's degree in Business Administration from the University of Getulio Vargas, São Paulo, in 1981, his master's degree in Political Science from Georgetown University in 1983, and his master's degree in Business Administration from the University of Getulio Vargas in 1987. He is fluent in Portuguese, French, and English, in addition to his knowledge of Arabic.

He served as a foreign delegate to the Lebanese newspaper L'Orient-Le Jour between 1983 and 1984. Between 1985 and 1992, he was responsible for financial planning at one of the largest paper mills in Brazil. Subsequently, he served as a private financial advisor between 1992 and 1995 and later worked at Merrill Lynch between 1995 and 2000.

Carlos has been managing, since his return to Lebanon in 2000, the farm owned by his family for more than 150 years, producing wheat, vegetables, and grapes for wine production.

In 2004 he participated actively in the 14 March Alliance and was among those who formulated the strategy to unify the opposition, leading to the departure of the Syrians. He presented a complete electoral law to reform the inefficient election system based on the single district. He also put forward a complete economic plan at the time of the election aiming to reinvigorate the Lebanese economy. In 2005, he unsuccessfully ran for the Maronite seat of Byblos, longtime stronghold of his party, winning 32,125 votes against 50,840 for the Maronite candidate of the Free Patriotic Movement . He also ran unsuccessfully for the Maronite seat in Kesserwan in the 2009 elections and also lost to the Free Patriotic Movement candidate.

Edde has not been active politically since 2009. In 2018 the party reformed its structure, and Edde accepted to stay for one year only. He is no longer Honorary President of the party.
