= Péri Cochin =

French TV host with Lebanese and Iraqi origins

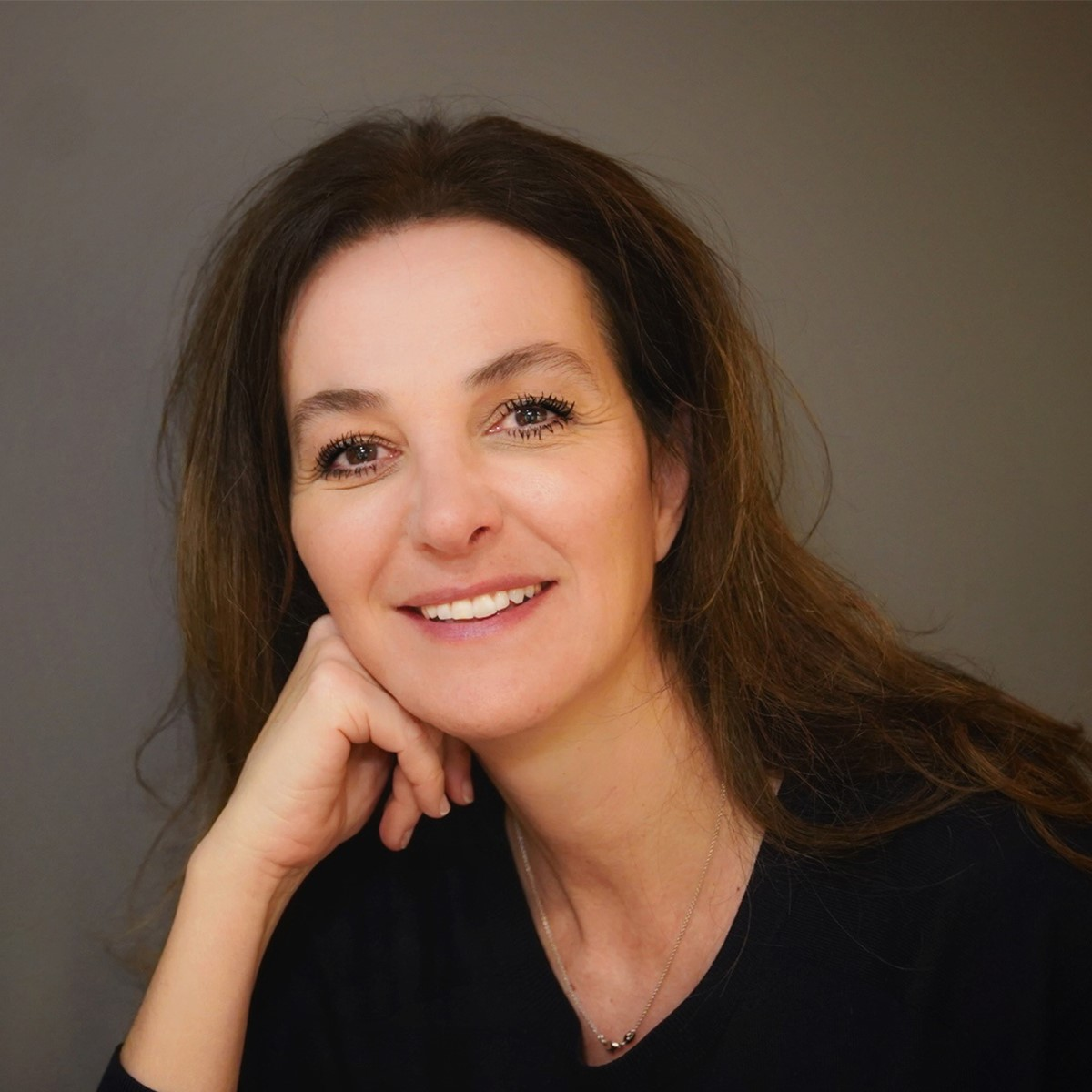
- Péri Cochin in 2020
- Born: Périhane Chalabi; May 28, 1965 (age 60); Beirut, Lebanon
- Occupations: Television presenter, producer, entrepreneur

Périhane Chalabi Cochin (Arabic: بيريهان جالابي كوتشين; born 28 May 1965 in Beirut) more commonly known as Péri Cochin, is a French TV host with Lebanese and Iraqi heritage. She runs the company Waww La Table, which she co-founded in 2020.

== Biography ==
Chalabi Cochin was born in 1965 in Beirut to Iraqi businessman Talal Chalabi, a brother of the banker and politician Ahmad Chalabi and her mother is Lebanese. The Chalabis descend from a Shia dynasty of merchants and bankers in Baghdad. Péri and her family left Lebanon for France in 1974 at the age of nine, at the start of the Lebanese Civil War.

After attending boarding school and passing her baccalauréat at the age of 16, Péri enrolled at the École du Louvre, where she specialised in contemporary art. Finding these studies lacking in vitality, she decided to change. She went on to study architecture, obtaining her DESA diploma with a special mention from the jury.

She has three children with the architect Guillaume Cochin: Théodore, Aristide and Hippolyte.

On 17 May 2013, on Laurent Ruquier's show on Europe 1, she announced that she was pregnant with her fourth child (a daughter, Talma) with her new partner, for whom it would be the first child.

She was godmother of Papillons blancs de Paris for 15 years, an association that works in the interests of people with mental and cognitive disabilities and their families.

== Career ==
In 1991, she launched La Tarte aux Bonbons with her sister-in-law.

Her travels gave her the idea in 1997 of registering a patent to prevent salt from clumping (sticking) when it's damp. At the same time, she designed and developed the first line of indoor/outdoor furniture in exotic wood for a leading manufacturer.

=== TV host and producer ===
In 2001, recognized for her numerous skills, her humour and her outspokenness, she joined Laurent Ruquier's team for his shows On va s'gêner on Europe 1 and On a tout essayé on France 2 until the show was discontinued in 2007. She also appeared on Les Grosses Têtes' and L'Émission pour tous on France 2.

In 2007, she joined Guillaume Durand in his new cultural programme, Esprits libres.

On 20 September 2008, along with four columnists, she presented her own programme Bien dans ma vie, devoted to well-being and broadcast every Saturday on M6. She decided not to renew for a second season because her career as a producer took over.

Péri Cochin launched a parallel production business with her company Periscoop in 2005. She bought the rights to Tout le monde en parle and Un gars, une fille to produce them in Arabic for television stations in the Middle East. Taratata, Union libre, Sans aucun doute and many other successful adaptations soon followed. All these prime-time entertainment programmes are broadcast via satellite from the Persian Gulf to the Maghreb.

In 2015, she bought the rights to Got Talent for French-speaking Africa and began production of L'Afrique a un incroyable talent, with a prestigious jury including Angelique Kidjo, Fally Ipupa and Claudia Tagbo. She opened an office in Abidjan in 2016 to make the most of this super-production in 22 countries, with six broadcasting channels including Canal+ Afrique. Two seasons followed, with more than 10,000 candidates auditioned across all the countries and numerous awards from Facebook and YouTube for the record-breaking number of followers and views.

=== Other activities ===
In 2007, Péri published a book entitled Péri, mode de vie, mode d'emploi, published by Calmann Levy.

She also expanded her production activities in 2008, buying the rights to a Spanish play entitled El Otro Lado de la Cama and working on the project that would become Open Bed. She approached Laurent Ruquier about doing a French adaptation, and they ended up co-producing the play, which was performed by Elisa Tovati and Titoff at Les Bouffes Parisiens.

At the same time, she created J'adoreLesDiners.com, a website aimed at anyone who wanted to widen their circle of acquaintances by taking part in dinners in every major city in France.

In 2013, Péri invented a new kind of lottery, a charity lottery, 1 Picasso for 100 Euros in aid of Tyre (an ancient city in southern Lebanon, listed as a UNESCO World Heritage Site), via the International Association to Save Tyre.

A second 1 Picasso for 100 Euros lottery took place in 2019.

"What I love most of all is creating new concepts," she says. In 2020, with her friend Arabelle Reille, she co-founded Waww la Table, a medium of influence and inspiration, as well as an e-commerce site.

== Publication ==
- 2007 : Péri, mode de vie, mode d'emploi (pref. Laurent Ruquier and Jacques Séguéla), Paris, éd. N°1 / Calmann-Lévy, 2007, 232 p., 14 × 21 cm + CD-ROM (ISBN 978-2-84612-215-3)
