= Jafar Sharafeddin =

Lebanese Baathist politician (1920–2001)

Sayed Jafar Sharafeddin (born in 1920 in Tyre, died on 25 July 2001 in Tyre) was a Lebanese Baathist politician, who served as a deputy (member) of the Lebanese parliament.

He started his political career during the 1958 Lebanon crisis and subsequently played a key role in the politics of Southern Lebanon towards the empowerment of the marginalised Shia communities on the national level, not least by inviting his relative Musa Sadr – who went on to found the Amal Movement – to succeed his father as Imam of Tyre.

== Life ==
=== Family background ===
Sharafeddin was one of the sons of Sayed Abdul Hussein Sharafeddin al-Musawi, an outstanding Shi'a Twelver Islamic scholar from the prestigious Al-Musawi family which has a transnational identity and amongst its prominent members included Ruhollah Khomeini. The Sharafeddins trace their lineage traces its lineage to Muhammad through Musa al-Kazim, the seventh Shi'a Imam, because of his relation to the first Imam, Ali ibn Abi Talib and Fatima Zahra, the daughter of the Muhammad.

The elder Sharafeddin has been widely considered a social reformer and "activist" who founded modern Tyre. One of his most important achievements was the founding of a modern school there, for which he pledged his own private home. At the time, the Shiites had the highest illiteracy rates among the Lebanese communities. The project consisted of a girls school called al-Zahra after the daughter of Mummad and one for boys, named al-Jafariya after the sixth Imam, Ja'far al-Sadiq, the founder of the Ja'fari school of jurisprudence.

"The school became the corner stone that changed the life of the Shi'ites in Jabal `Amil in general and Tyre in particular."

=== Education ===
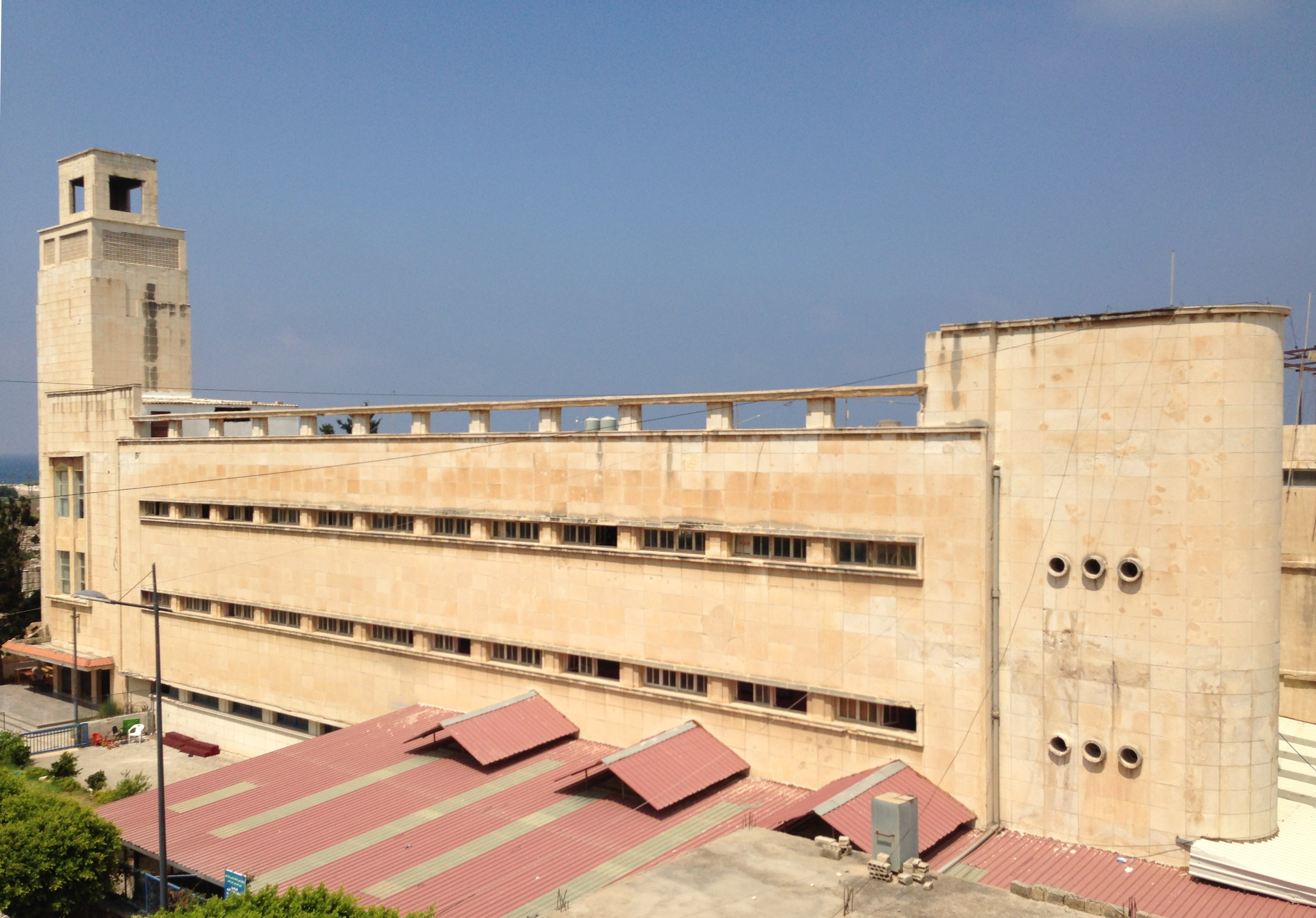
Al Jafariya in 2019

Sayed Jafar attended the teaching sessions of his father and subsequently joined the Al Azhar College in Beirut, from where he graduated as a lawyer.

Between 1945 and 1948, he published the cultural magazine Almahad, which promoted the dissemination of scientific knowledge and especially the idea of school enrollment.

While Jafar's nephew Hussein Sharafeddin became the director of the Jafariya School, which their father had founded in 1938 as the first of its kind in Tyre, he also took over responsibility for its development and contributed substantially to its expansion: in 1951 his father sent him on a fundraising trip to West Africa with its large diaspora of Tyrians, who had escaped poverty during the Ottoman and French colonial times and obtained great wealth as Merchants. Two more such missions followed in 1954 and 1956 which allowed for the construction of a modern school building overlooking the archaeological Al Mina / City site on the Southwestern side of the Tyre peninsula towards the Mediterranean Sea. As a sign of appreciation, the main building was named the "Building of the Emigrants" (Binayat al-Muhajir), and its architectural design symbolises the shape of a ship.

To raise the educational level in the peripheral areas of Jabal Amel Sayed Jafar started a rural development association which founded a chain of schools in places where illiteracy was prevailing,

=== Political career ===
==== 1958 Lebanese civil war ====
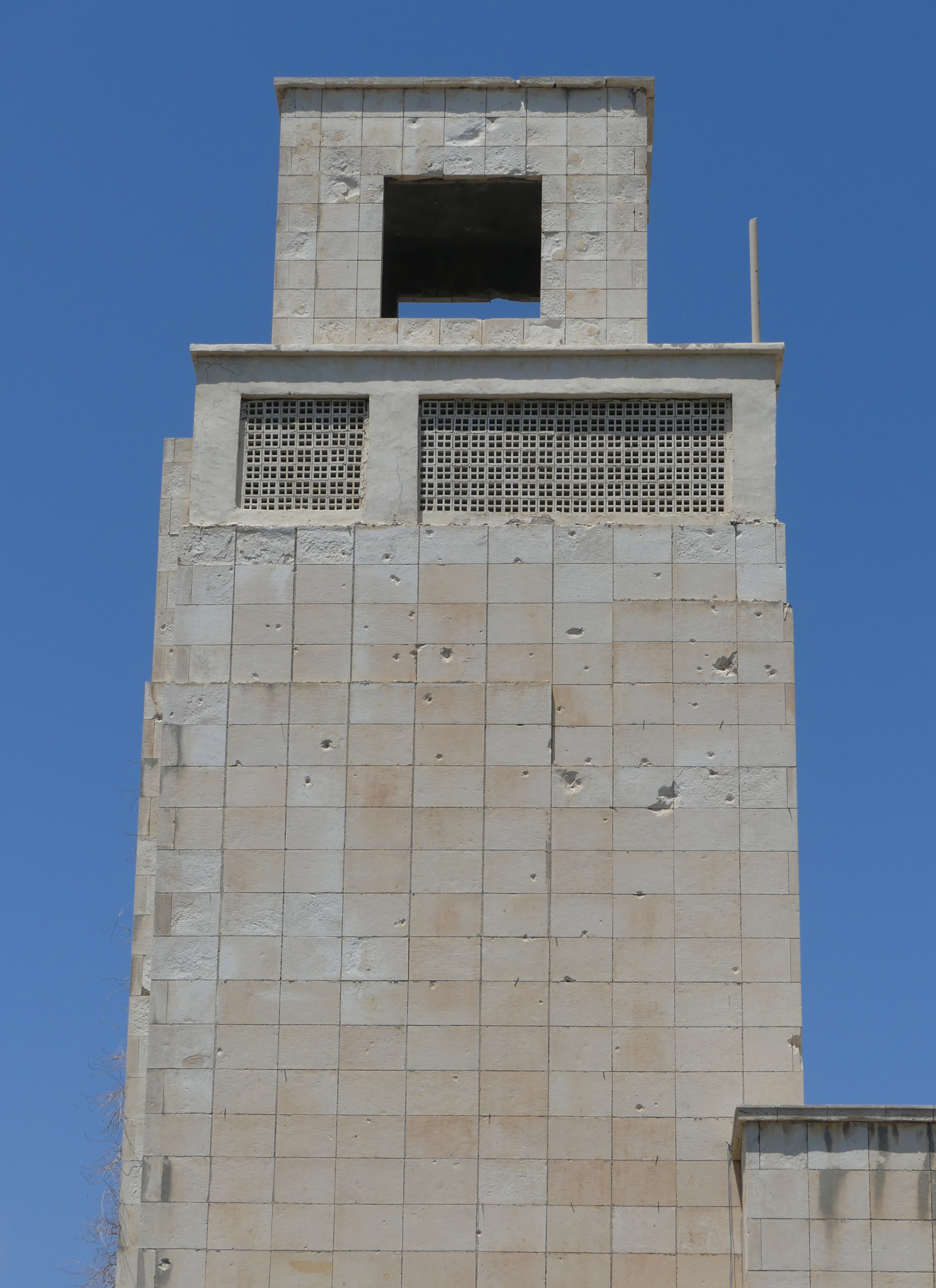
Bullet holes from 1958 at Jafariya

After the death of Sharafeddin senior on 31 December 1957 at the age of 85, Jafar and his brothers "inherited" the Imam's competition with the Shia feudal dynasty of the Tyre-based al-Khalil clan, who "with their age-old ways, [..] were known for being particularly rough and hard." The power-struggle quickly escalated, since the Sharafeddin ally Ahmed al-Asaad from the feudal Ali al-Saghir dynasty had lost the vote for deputy in the 1957 general election to Kazem al-Khalil. The latter became the only Shi'ite minister in the cabinet of Sami as-Sulh, to whose family his clan was traditionally allied. Al-Asaad became a "major instigator" against President Camille Chamoun and his ally al-Khalil

"Kazim's followers had a free hand in Tyre; they could carry Guns on the streets".

Then, after the formation of the United Arab Republic (UAR) under Gamal Abdel Nasser in February 1958, tensions escalated in Tyre between the forces of Chamoun and supporters of Pan-Arabism. The Jafariya school became the base of the opposition. Still in February, five of its students were arrested and "sent to jail for trampling on the Lebanese flag and replacing it with that of the UAR." Sayed Jafar's nephew Hussein, who was the director of Jafariya and a leader in the protests, was imprisoned, too. On 28 March, soldiers and followers of Kazem al-Khalil opened fire on demonstrators and – according to some reports – killed three. On the second of April, four or five protestors were killed and about a dozen injured.

In May 1958, the insurgents, who were armed by Ahmed al-Asaad and his son Kamil al-Asaad, gained the upper hand in Tyre. According to a general delegate of the International Committee of the Red Cross (ICRC) who visited in late July, "heavy fighting went on for 16 days". Eventually, Kazem al-Khalil was expelled from the city and the Sharafeddin family "took over control". The national crisis dissolved in September, when Chamoun stepped down. Al-Khalil returned to Tyre still in 1958, but was attacked several times by gunmen. Despite the victory of the al-As'ad dynasty who had played a dominant role in Tyre and Jabal Amel for almost three centuries, its power began to crumble at the same time with the arrival of a newcomer:

Following these events, Sharafeddin and other representatives of the Shia community of Southern Lebanon went to Iraq to invite his relative Sayyid Musa Sadr to be Abdul Hussein's successor as Imam. According to some source, Sharafeddin at first asked Musa's older brother Sayed Reza al-Sadr to take up the position, but he declined. In 1959, Sadr moved to Tyre and at first encountered not only suspicion, but also opposition. Yet, within just a few years he managed to create a broad following.

==== Political offices ====
In the 1960 Lebanese general election, Sharafeddin was elected in the Tyre constituency with the highest number of votes to serve as a deputy in the Parliament of Lebanon, to which he was re-elected in the 1964 general election. There he made the following plea, which arguably summarises the precarious socio-economic situation of his constituency in the mid-20th century most precisely:

"The district of Tyre has sixty villages, to which God Almighty has given all kinds of beauty. But the rulers of Tyre have deprived Tyre and the surroundings of their rights. Of these sixty villages only a dozen or so have anything that could be called a school or a paved road. Forty villages are without a school. These sixty villages go thirsty in this age of science and the machine, while a river [the Litani] passes them by on the way to the sea. All sixty villages lack electricity. Electricity is the fortune of more privileged districts. .. These sixty villages are deserted, inhabited by old men and women; the young ones have departed to toil in the heat of Africa. Thousands more have come to Beirut, to toil among others of their kind. Tyre itself, the heart of the district, has suffered what no city can suffer. It has become a deformed, ruined place. Everything in it falls short of what a civilised place should be. The government should restore to Tyre its splendor."

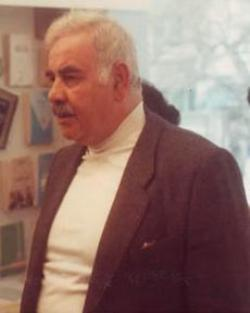
undated photo from his later years

In the 1968 general election, he was re-elected once more.

In 1976, local commanders of the Palestinian Liberation Organisation (PLO) took over the municipal government of Tyre with support from their allies of the Lebanese Arab Army (LAA) and declared the founding of the "People's Republic of Tyre". However, the new rulers quickly lost support from the Lebanese-Tyrian population because of their "arbitrary and often brutal behavior". Even Sharafeddin, who had promoted freedom for the Palestinians like his father before him, was quoted as criticising the PLO for "its violations and sabotage of the Palestinian cause".

=== Later years ===
In 1992, he provided an extensive amount of his memories and unpublished documents through oral history interviews for a PhD thesis on the history of "Political awareness of the Shi'ites in Lebanon" which was accepted by the University of Durham.
