= Michel Eddé =

Lebanese Maronite lawyer, philanthropist, and politician (1928–2019)

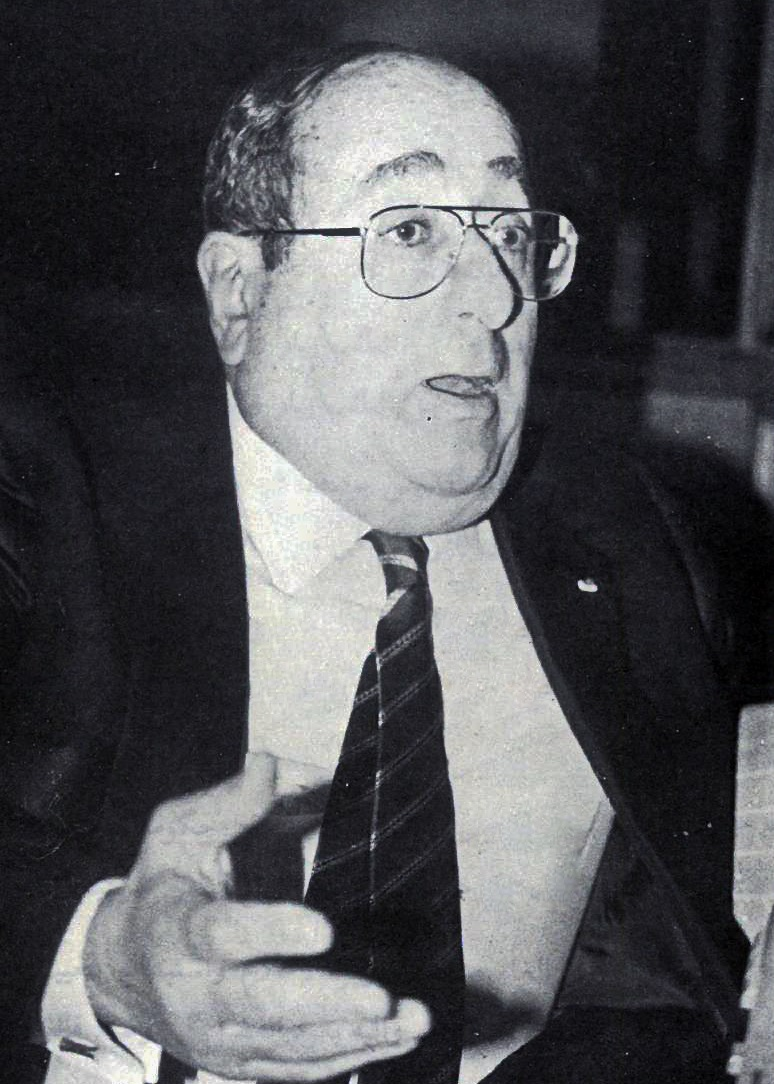
Michel Eddé

Michel Eddé (16 February 1928 - 3 November 2019) was a Lebanese Maronite lawyer, philanthropist, and politician.

Throughout his life, Eddé was a defender of the confessional plurality of Lebanon and of the political and cultural coexistence of different communities.

Upon his death, the French Embassy in Lebanon decreed that Eddé was a "man of dialogue and harmony between communities and faiths".
