= Chehabism =

Lebanese political ideology

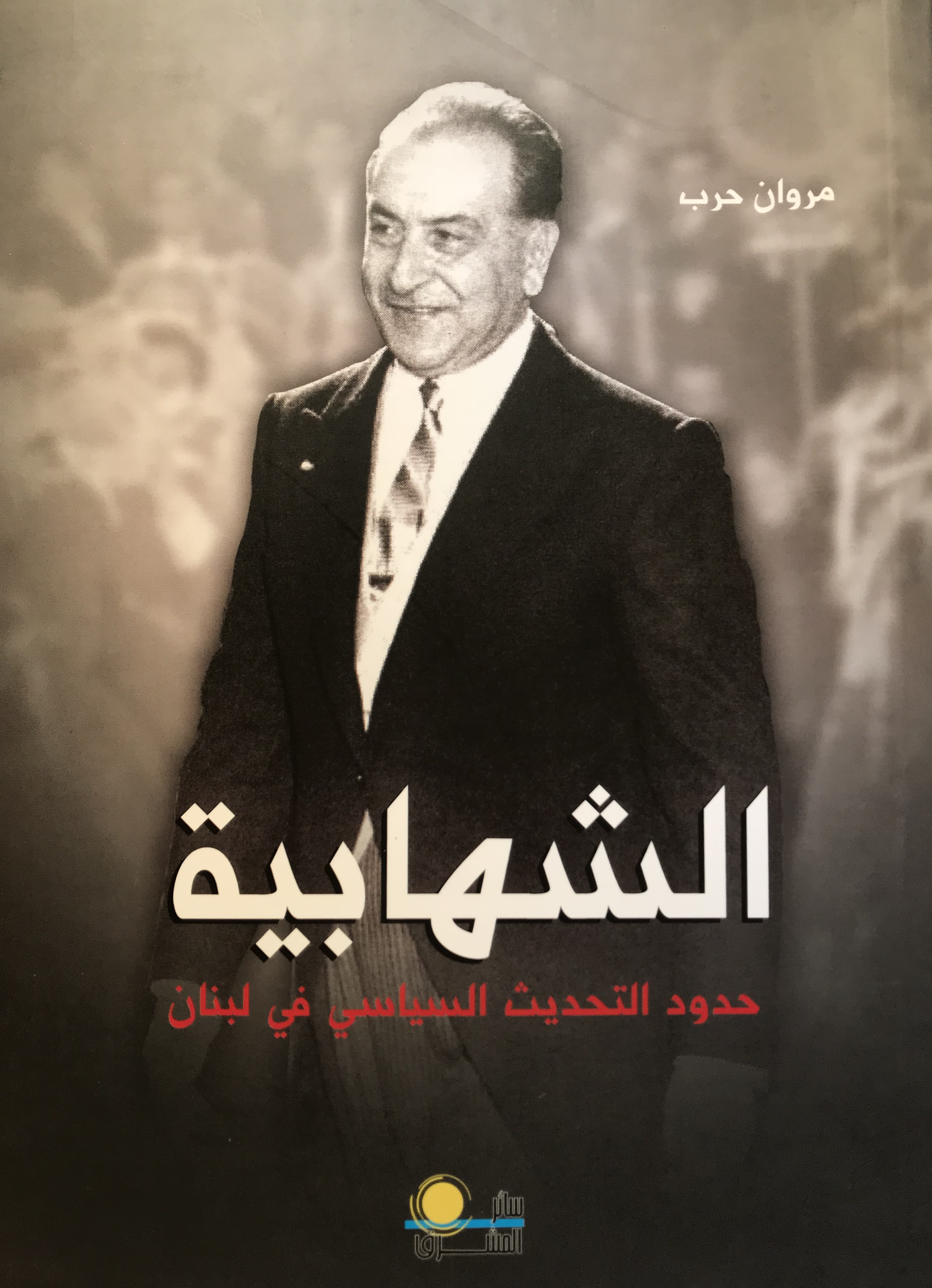
A political study of Fouad Chehab written by Marwan Harb

Chehabism (also spelt Shehabism or Shihabism; Arabic: الشِهابية, romanized: ash-Shihābiyya) is a political ideology in Lebanon which follows the principles of former president and army general Fouad Chehab. The ideology later influenced the presidency of Charles Helou and Élias Serkis. The writer Marwan Harb is considered one of the most prominent authors who have written about Chehabism and analyzed it as a modernizing political project.

== Ideology ==
Chehab's rule was a delicate balancing act of maintaining relative harmony between the nation's Christian and Muslim populations. He followed the path and principles of dialogue and moderation coupled with public reforms, which came to be known as Chehabism. Generally deeply respected for his honesty and integrity, Chehab is credited with a number of reform plans and regulations to create a modern administration and efficient public services. That eventually brought him into conflict with the traditional feudal, confessional, and clan-based politicians, who saw their grip on power diminishing. Chehab embraced social democracy but also economic liberalism.

== Development ==
=== 1958–1963 ===
Fouad Chehab's presidency was a delicate balancing act of maintaining relative harmony between the nation's Christian and Muslim populations. He followed the path and principles of dialogue and moderation coupled with public reforms, which came to be known as Chehabism. Chehab is credited with a number of reform plans and regulations to create a modern administration and efficient public services especially after the 1958 Lebanon crisis. That eventually brought him into conflict with the traditional feudal, confessional, and clan-based politicians, who saw their grip on power diminishing.

The alliance between Chehab and Lebanese prime minister Rashid Karami, a staunch Arab nationalist, soon left Karami in effective control of the Lebanese government. The most pressing issue that was first to cause problems for Helou was the Israeli diversion of the Jordan River.

=== 1964–1970 ===
Charles Helou was elected to succeed Fouad Chehab as president by the National Assembly in 1964.

The Six-Day War of 1967 strained sectarian relations in Lebanon. Many Muslims wanted Lebanon to join the Arab war effort, while many Christians wished to eschew participation.

=== Downfall ===
Chehab was widely expected to contest the presidential election of 1970 but he declared that his experience in office had convinced him that the people of Lebanon were not ready to put aside traditional or feudal politics or to support him in building a modern state. He chose to endorse his protégé, Elias Sarkis, instead. In the closest and possibly most controversial presidential election in Lebanese history, the National Assembly elected Frangieh to the Presidency of the Republic on 23 September 1970. He owed his upset victory over Elias Sarkis, the official candidate of the Chehabi regime to a last minute change of mind by Kamal Jumblatt, whose supporters in the Parliament switched their votes to Frangieh.

== See also ==
- Fouad Chehab
- Arab nationalism
- Charles Helou
- Élias Serkis
