= Raymond Eddé =

Lebanese politician (1913–2000)

Raymond Edde
- ريمون إدّه
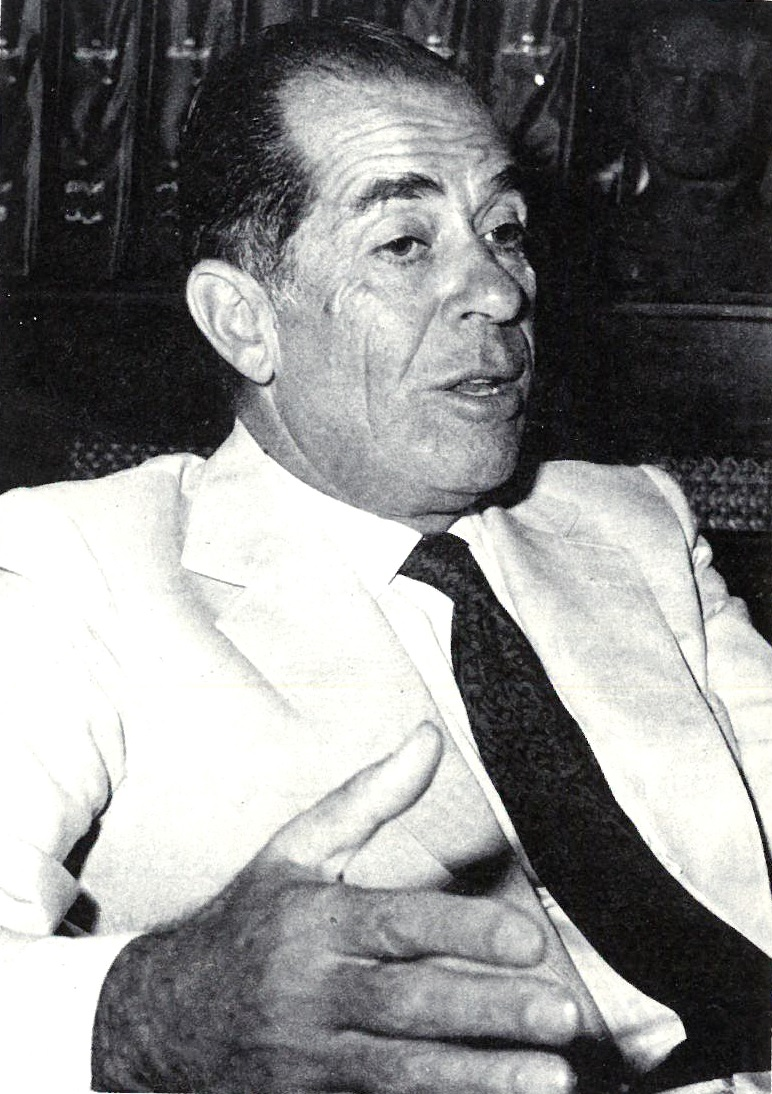

Leader of the Lebanese National Bloc
- In office 27 September 1949 – 10 May 2000
- Preceded by: Émile Eddé
- Succeeded by: Carlos Edde

Personal details
- Born: Raymond Émile Eddé; 15 March 1913 Alexandria, Egypt
- Died: 10 May 2000 (aged 87) Paris, France
- Party: Lebanese National Bloc
- Parent: Émile Eddé (father)

Raymond Eddé (Arabic: ريمون إدّه; 15 March 1913 – 10 May 2000) was a Lebanese Maronite politician and za'im (political leader) who served for many years as a legislator and cabinet minister, including in the role of Minister of the Interior. He led the Lebanese National Bloc, an influential political party, and represented northern Lebanon's Byblos district from 1953 to 1976.

The son of former President Émile Eddé, Raymond Eddé was himself a candidate for the presidency in 1958, 1965 and 1976, but all three attempts failed. His legacy includes advocating for civil marriage, supporting United Nations presence in southern Lebanon, and introducing the 1956 banking secrecy law that allowed both Lebanese entrepreneurship and corruption to flourish.

His supporters called him "Lebanon's Conscience". He was a strong nationalist, who opposed the French Mandate, and later, Syrian, Israeli, and Palestinian military interventions in Lebanon.

In 1976, after surviving three assassination attempts that year alone, Eddé went into exile in Paris, where he remained until his death in 2000.

== Early life ==
Eddé was born in Alexandria, Egypt, where his father, a native of the town of Edde in the Byblos District and an opponent of Ottoman control of Lebanon, had taken refuge after being sentenced to death for subversion. In 1920, following the establishment of the French Mandate, Émile Eddé returned to Beirut with his wife, Laudi Sursock, and family. The young Raymond Eddé was educated at Jesuit schools and graduated with a law degree in 1934.

== Career ==
Eddé succeeded his father, who died in 1949, as leader of the National Bloc. He was subsequently elected to the National Assembly from a Byblos constituency in 1953; except for a one-year break (1964–1965, when he lost his seat but subsequently recovered it in a by-election), he remained in parliament until 1992, when he decided to boycott an election held under Syrian auspices, an election that he considered to be gerrymandered and rigged.

In the National Assembly, Eddé sponsored reforms in Lebanon's rent laws (in 1954) and banking (1956), laying the basis for the Swiss-style confidential banking system that proved to be a factor in Lebanon's explosive economic growth in the following decade. An unsuccessful candidate for the Presidency in 1958, Eddé was subsequently appointed to the Cabinet by President Fuad Chehab, with the portfolios of the Interior, Social Affairs, Labour, and Posts and Telecommunications. The following year, however, he had a public falling out with Chehab over what he saw as interference in political and electoral affairs by the Deuxième Bureau (Lebanon's military intelligence service), and resigned from the cabinet in protest. He led the parliamentary opposition to the regime of Chehab and of Charles Helou, his handpicked successor, throughout the 1960s.

In 1968, Eddé's National Bloc joined the Helf Alliance, a grouping which included former President Camille Chamoun's National Liberal Party and Pierre Gemayel's Kataeb Party. In the parliamentary election held that year, the Helf Alliance won 30 seats in the 99 member National Assembly – the best result to date for any organized electoral force in Lebanon's notoriously fractured legislature. The alliance was not to last, however: he took his party out of the alliance in 1969 following the Cairo Agreement between the Lebanese government and the Palestine Liberation Organization (PLO), which allowed the latter to establish bases in Southern Lebanon from which to launch commando raids against Israel. Eddé was, and remained, implacably opposed to permitting any non-Lebanese armed force to operate on Lebanese soil. He also opposed diverting the tributaries of the Jordan River, an Arab League proposal floated in 1964 and again in 1968, with a view to cutting off Israel's water supply. He warned that it would make Lebanon a target for Israeli raids, and cited the Israeli attack on Beirut Airport on 28 December 1968 as evidence of this. His consistent position of avoiding a military confrontation with Israel was rare in Lebanese politics.

Convinced that the dozen years of Chehabist rule had not been in Lebanon's best interests, Eddé supported the election Suleiman Frangieh to the Presidency on 17 August 1970, against the Chehabist candidate, Elias Sarkis. His alliance with Frangieh did not last long, however. In 1974, he formed a new coalition with former Prime Ministers Saeb Salam and Rashid Karami, both Sunni Muslims.

When the Lebanese Civil War broke out in 1975, Eddé was the only major Christian politician to be living in the predominantly Sanyah quarter of Sunni Muslim West Beirut. Remaining on good terms with local Muslim politicians, his intervention on many occasions helped bring about the release of Christians who had been kidnapped by Muslim militias. A believer in coexistence between Christians and Muslim, Eddé opposed plans to partition Lebanon into ethnic and sectarian statelets, plans which he accused the United States Secretary of State Henry Kissinger of conspiring to foist on Lebanon, and visited France and the Vatican in an attempt to rally opposition to the purported conspiracy.

In 1976, Eddé stood as a candidate for the Presidency; his failure to win a single vote in the National Assembly led to allegations of electoral misconduct. On 22 December of that year, following three attempts on his life, he left Lebanon for Paris, where he was to spend the rest of his life. He refused to return while Syrian and Israeli troops remained on Lebanese soil, in what he called an occupation. He continued to speak out on Lebanese affairs. His last words, when he died on 10 May 2000, were, "I'm thinking. I'm thinking of Lebanon."

Eddé's nephew, Carlos Eddé, now leads the Lebanese National Bloc.
