= Zaher el-Khatib =

Lebanese politician (1940–2025)

Zaher el-Khatib (Arabic: زاهر الخطيب; 1940 – 18 November 2025) was a Lebanese politician.

== Background ==
El-Khatib was born in 1940 to a Sunni family. He obtained a Bachelor of Law degree from the Lebanese University. As of 2018, he served as General Secretary of the Toilers League.

El-Khatib died on 18 November 2025, at the age of 85.

== Political career ==
El-Khatib was elected to parliament in the 1971 Chouf parliamentary by-election, after the death of his father Anwar el-Khatib (the incumbent Sunni parliamentarian from Chouf). He was reelected to parliament in the 1971, 1992, 1996 and 2000 elections. He was one of two Lebanese parliamentarians to vote against the 1983 May 17 Agreement.

He served as Minister of State for Administrative Reform between 24 December 1990 and 16 May 1992, in the first cabinet of Omar Karami.

As of 2018, el-Khatib served as chairman of the Lebanese Committee for Support to the Reunification of Korea.

== See also ==
- Amal Movement
- Lebanese Civil War
- Mountain War (Lebanon)
