= Mohsen Dalloul =

Lebanese journalist and politician (1933–2026)

- محسن دلول

Personal details
- Born: 27 June 1933 Aali en Nahri, Lebanon
- Died: 17 February 2026 (aged 92)
- Party: Progressive Socialist Party
- Children: 4
- Occupation: Journalist

Mohsen Dalloul (Arabic: محسن دلول; 27 June 1933 – 17 February 2026) was a Lebanese journalist and politician. Being a member of the Progressive Socialist Party he served as the minister of agriculture and minister of defense in the 1990s. Dalloul was a long-term member of the Lebanese Parliament, serving between 1991 and 2004.

== Early life and education ==
Dalloul was born in Aali en Nahri, Zahle district in 1933. He hailed from a Shiite family. He attended Oriental College in Zahlé where he completed his secondary education. He held a degree in sociology.

== Career ==
Following his graduation Dalloul worked as a teacher in the Bekaa and Beirut districts. He then began to work for newspapers and magazines and joined the Editors’ Syndicate where he was a lifelong member. In 1951 he became a member of the Progressive Socialist Party and held various positions including deputy chairman. In the 1980s he also served as a senior aide to Walid Jumblatt, party's leader.

Dalloul was first elected as a deputy representing the Baalbek-Hermel district in the elections in 1991. In the general elections in 1992 he was elected to the Parliament from the Zahle district. He was elected as a deputy from the Bekaa Governorate in the elections held in 1996 and from the Zahle district in the elections of 2000.

He was appointed minister of agriculture to the cabinet led by Prime Minister Selim Hoss and held the post from 25 November 1989 to 24 December 1990. He served in the same post in the cabinet of Omar Karami from 24 December 1990 to 16 May 1992 and in the cabinet headed by Rashid Solh between 16 May 1992 and 31 October 1992. Dalloul was named as the minister of defence on 31 October 1992 and served in the post in the first cabinet of Rafiq Hariri until 25 May 1995. He continued to serve in the same post in the second cabinet of Hariri from 11 July 1996 and in the next Hariri cabinet between 11 July 1996 and November 1998.

=== Views and alliances ===
Dalloul had a pro-Syrian and pro-Iran stance, as well as close connections with the Syrian politicians. It was Syrian vice president Abdul Halim Khaddam who helped Dalloul to assume significant cabinet posts. Dalloul's another close confidant was Hikmat Shihabi, a senior Syrian military officer. During the civil war in Lebanon the Phalangist militia leader Bashir Gemayel and the Progressive Socialist Party leader Kamal Jumblatt secretly met at the Beirut apartment of Dalloul on 2 June 1976 while he was serving as the vice chairman of the party. In 2010 Dalloul argued that Iran should possess nuclear arms which should not be used only to maintain peace in the region, but also to have a dissuasive force against Israel.

== Personal life and death ==
Dalloul married Siham Kanaan, and they had four children: Nizar, Ali, Ziyad and Rola. His eldest son, Nizar, is married to the daughter of Nazik Hariri, second wife of Rafiq Hariri. Nizar and Ali Dalloul have business investments and were among the shareholders of LibanCell, Lebanese cell phone company, between 1994 and 2002. Dalloul's sons were granted the license for the cell phone operator when their father was serving as defense minister in the Hariri cabinets. In the late 1990s the shareholders of LibanCell included Telecom Finland, also known as Sonera (14%), and Saudi Al Mabani (20%).

He was the author of various books, which were published in the 2000s.

Dalloul died on 17 February 2026, at the age of 93.
