= Muhammad Baydoun =

Lebanese politician (1952–2022)

Minister of Electrical and Water Resources
- In office October 2000 – March 2003
- Prime Minister: Rafik Hariri

Minister of Electrical and Water Resources
- In office 16 May 1992 – 30 October 1992
- Prime Minister: Rashid Al Solh

Minister of Housing and Cooperatives
- In office 24 December 1990 – 10 May 1992
- Prime Minister: Omar Karami

Personal details
- Born: Muhammad Abdel Hamid Baydoun; 5 February 1952 Bachoura, Beirut, Lebanon
- Died: 17 May 2022 (aged 70)
- Party: Amal Movement (formerly); 14 March coalition
- Education: Lebanese University; Claude Bernard University

Muhammad Abdel Hamid Baydoun (Arabic: محمد عبد الحميد بيضون; 5 February 1952 – 17 May 2022) was a moderate Lebanese politician and served as a member of the Lebanese parliament from 1992 until 2005. He also served as minister of power and energy as recently as 2005. He participated in many rallies organized by the 14 March coalition.

== Early life and education ==
Baydoun was born into a Shiite family in Bachoura, Beirut, on 5 February 1952. His family were originally from Bint Jbeil in South Lebanon. Baydoun held a bachelor of science degree in mathematics from Lebanese University and a PhD in mathematics from Claude Bernard University in Lyon, France.

== Career ==
Baydoun worked as mathematics professor at Lebanese University from 1976 to 1988. In 1980, he became a senior official of the Amal Movement. He was named a member of Amal's political bureau in 1982 and appointed president of the bureau on 14 October 1998. Baydoun is also former president of Amal's council of the south (1985-1991). In 1991, he was appointed deputy from Amal and elected in the general election in 1992 and general election in 1996 for the Shi’ite seat in Tyre, South Lebanon. He also won his seat in the general election in 2000 receiving more votes than Hezbollah candidates.

Baydoun also served as government minister in different cabinets. He was first appointed minister of housing and cooperatives in Omar Karami's government. He served in this post from 24 December 1990 to 10 May 1992. Then, he was appointed minister of electrical and water resources in Rachid Al Solh's cabinet, and was in office from 16 May 1992 to 30 October 1992. He also served in the cabinet led by Prime Minister Salim Hoss from 1998 to 2000. Baydoun was appointed minister of electrical and water resources to the cabinet led by Prime Minister Rafik Hariri in October 2000. Baydoun was expelled by Nabih Berri, head of the Amal movement, from the cabinet in March 2003.

In October 2012, Baydoun declared that he was ready to become Parliament speaker if his candidacy was backed by the March 14 Coalition.

Baydoun had also business activities and was a member of the board and of the audit committee of the İBL Bank.

=== Views and influence ===
At the beginning of the 2000s, Baydoun was a pro-Syrian politician, who had close ties with "old guards" in Damascus such as Hikmat Shihabi and Abdul Halim Khaddam. In June 2008, Baydoun stated that Saad Hariri was unable to organize the Sunni community or defend it and to build the institutions of state.

The Shiite community of Lebanon has been dominated by a number of feudal families. Although Baydoun was not part of these families, he was among the individuals who has influence on the Shiite community.

== Death ==
Baydoun died on 17 May 2022 due to an undisclosed illness.
