= Development and Liberation =

Lebanese parliamentary bloc

Development and Liberation Bloc التنمية والتحرير
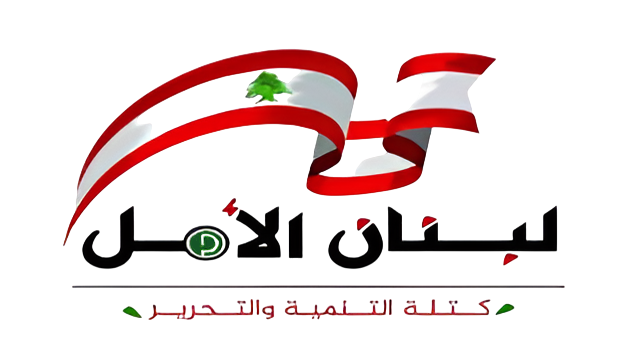
- Chamber: Parliament of Lebanon
- Foundation: 1992
- Member parties: Amal Movement; National Banner Party
- President: Nabih Berri
- Representation: 15 / 128 (12%)

Development and Liberation (Arabic: التنمية والتحرير) is the parliamentary bloc of the Amal Movement and National Banner Party in the Parliament of Lebanon. Headed by Nabih Berri, it consists of 15 deputies after the 2022 general election.

Berri headed the list of "Liberation" in the parliamentary elections that took place in southern Lebanon on 6 September 1992, which was won in full. The other lists he headed were "Liberation and Development" in the parliamentary elections on 8 September 1996, which was won in full. Since 1992 he has chaired the Liberation and Development parliamentary bloc.

== Election summary ==
Election	Seats	Change	Source
1992	17 / 128 (13%)	New	
1996	21 / 128 (16%)	▲4	
2000	16 / 128 (13%)	▼5	
2005	15 / 128 (12%)	▼1	
2009	13 / 128 (10%)	▼2	
2018	17 / 128 (13%)	▲4	
2022	15 / 128 (12%)	▼2	

== 2022–2026 session deputies ==
Name	Party	District	Religion
Mohamed Khawaja	Amal Movement	Beirut II	Shia
Fadi Alameh	Amal Movement	Baabda	Shia
Nabih Berri	Amal Movement	Zahrani	Shia
Ali Osseiran	Amal Movement	Zahrani	Shia
Michel Moussa	Amal Movement	Zahrani	Greek Catholic
Ali Khreis	Amal Movement	Tyr	Shia
Inaya Ezzeddine	Amal Movement	Tyr	Shia
Nasser Jaber	Amal Movement	Nabatieh	Shia
Hani Kobeissi	Amal Movement	Nabatieh	Shia
Ashraf Beydoun	Amal Movement	Bint Jbeil	Shia
Ayoub Hmayed	Amal Movement	Bint Jbeil	Shia
Kassem Hachem	Ba'ath Party	Marjeyoun–Hasbaya	Sunni
Ali Hassan Khalil	Amal Movement	Marjeyoun–Hasbaya	Shia
Kabalan Kabalan	Amal Movement	West Bekaa–Rashaya	Shia
Ghazi Zaiter	Amal Movement	Baalbeck–Hermel	Shia
