= Iqlim al-Kharrub =

Region of Chouf District, Lebanon

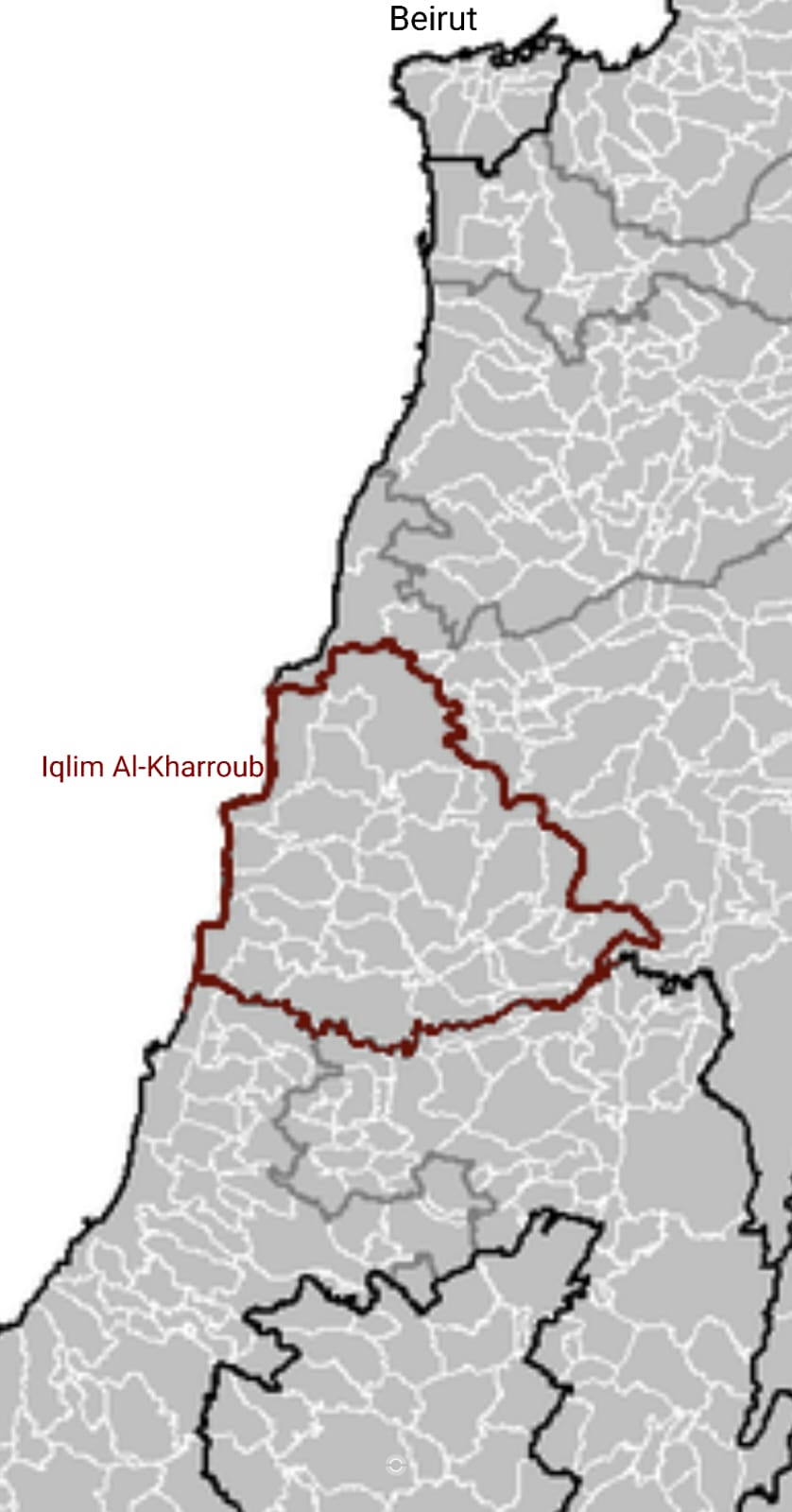
Map of the Kharroub district (Iqlim) and its proximity to Beirut.

Iqlim el-Kharrub (Arabic: إقليم الخرّوب) is a geographic region in the western part of the Chouf District. Its inhabitants are mostly Sunni Muslims.

== Geographic definition ==
Iqlim al-Kharrub is a historical and socio-cultural region in the western part of the Chouf District. Its territory is traditionally defined as the area between the Awali River in the south and the Damour River in the north. It extends from the Mediterranean Sea coast eastward into the Chouf mountains. Its approximate territory is 167 square kilometers (64 sq mi). There are 37 villages and towns in the region, of which 25 are municipalities.

== Etymology ==
The name Iqlim al-Kharrub means region of the carob.

== History ==
The Iqlim al-Kharrub was a nahiye (subdistrict) of the Sidon-Beirut Sanjak with Chehime as its capital during Ottoman rule.

== Demography ==
Most of Iqlim al-Kharrub's population is Sunni Muslim and most Sunnis in the Chouf reside in the region. Unlike the rest of the Chouf where Druze form the demographic majority, there are no Druze population centers in the Iqlim al-Kharrub. The region's towns and large villages are all Sunni majority, including Chehim, the capital of the Iqlim. (Note: The mainly Sunni Muslim villages of Iqlim al-Kharrub are Anout, Baasir, Barja, Bsaba, Chhime, Dalhoun, Daraya, Mazboud, Mghayireh, and Siblin.) Shia Muslims make up the majority of the small villages of Jiyyeh, Joun and Wardaniyeh.

The Maronite Christian population of the region, which is mostly resident in eleven small villages, (Note: The mainly Christian villages of Iqlim al-Kharrub are Alman, Alman al-Chouf, Dibbiyeh, Jadra, Rmeileh, Jahlieh, Dahr El Maghara, Majdalouna and Mazmoura.) has mostly diminished. This is largely due to two mass displacements during the Lebanese Civil War, the first in the wake of the Damour massacre by the Palestine Liberation Organization (PLO) and allied Lebanese National Movement (LNM) militias on January 10, 1976, and the second in the Mountain War in 1983–1984 when the Lebanese Armed Forces (LAF), Christian Tigers Militia and Lebanese Forces militias, respectively, were routed by the mainly Druze fighters of the People's Liberation Army (PLA) led by Walid Jumblatt. Christian–Druze antagonism has persisted in the Chouf since the end of the civil war in 1991 and Christians have not returned in significant numbers despite processes of reconciliation and compensation overseen by the Jumblatts and the Maronite Patriarch. Sectarian tensions though were not as high between Christians and Muslims in the Iqlim al-Kharrub.

Palestinian refugees present in the area since the 1948 Arab-Israeli war have substantially integrated with the Lebanese population, in contrast to elsewhere in Lebanon. There has also been an influx of Syrian refugees fleeing the Syrian Civil War. Many Lebanese in the Iqlim al-Kharrub moved to the area during and after the civil war in search for a lower cost of living, especially compared to housing prices in the capital Beirut.

== Economy ==
Iqlim al-Kharrub connects Beirut in the north with Sidon in the south. The main source of income is wage employment in the public sector, followed by employment in manufacturing and the tourism sector.

== See also ==
- Lebanese Civil War
- Mountain War (Lebanon)

== Bibliography ==
- Abu-Husayn, Abdul-Rahim (November 1992). "Problems in the Ottoman Administration in Syria during the 16th and 17th Centuries: The Case of the Sanjak of Sidon-Beirut". International Journal of Middle East Studies. 24 (4): 665–675.
- Al-Masri, Muzna; Abla, Zeina (November 2017). "An Urban Suburb with the Capacities of a Village: The Social Stability Context in the Coastal Chouf Area". UNDP.
