= Mikhael Daher =

Lebanese lawyer and politician (1928–2023)

Mkhail Daher

Member of the Parliament of Lebanon
- In office 3 September 2000 – 31 May 2005
- In office 30 April 1972 – 15 October 1996

Minister of Education
- In office 31 October 1992 – 25 May 1995
- Prime Minister: Rafic Hariri
- Preceded by: Zaki Mazboudi
- Succeeded by: Robert Ghanem

Personal details
- Born: 15 August 1928 Al-Qoubaiyat, Greater Lebanon
- Died: 14 February 2023 (aged 94) Beirut, Lebanon
- Party: Free Patriotic Movement (since 2005)
- Education: Saint Joseph University; Lebanese University
- Occupation: Lawyer

Mkhail Daher (Arabic: مخايل الضَّاهر; 15 August 1928 – 14 February 2023) was a Lebanese lawyer and politician.

== Biography ==
Born in Al-Qoubaiyat on 15 August 1928, Daher studied at Saint Joseph University and the Lebanese University. A Maronite, he was elected to the Parliament of Lebanon in 1972 for the Akkar Governorate in northern Lebanon. In 1988, with the mandate of President Amine Gemayel coming to an end, the United States and Syria attempted to keep him in office. However, the Christian militias successfully prevented his re-election. American special envoy to Lebanon, Richard Murphy, stated that it was "Mikhael Daher or chaos".

In 1992, Daher was re-elected to the Parliament on a pro-Syrian list. That year, he was appointed Minister of Education in the first government of Prime Minister Rafic Hariri. However, he was defeated in 1996, but regained his mandate as a deputy in 2000.

In 2005, Daher stood for re-election on the list of the Free Patriotic Movement, but he was defeated.

Mikhael Daher died in Beirut on 14 February 2023, at the age of 94.
