= Assem Qanso =

Lebanese politician

Assem Qanso عاصم قانصوه
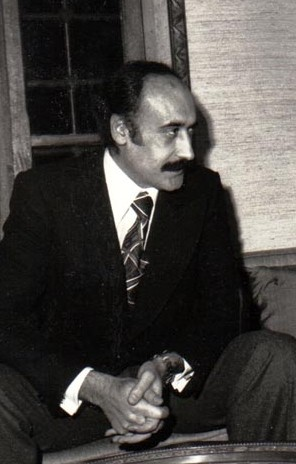
- Qanso in 1974

Member of Parliament for Baalbek-Hermel
- In office 2009–2018
- In office 1996–2005

Minister of Labour
- In office 2004–2005
- Prime Minister: Omar Karami
- Preceded by: Assaad Hardan
- Succeeded by: Trad Hamadeh

Secretary of the Lebanese (Ba'ath) Regional Command of the Ba'ath Party
- In office 2000–2005
- National Secretary: Abdullah al-Ahmar
- Preceded by: Sayf al-Din Ghazi
- Succeeded by: Sayf al-Din Ghazi
- In office 1971–1989
- National Secretary: Hafez al-Assad
- Preceded by: Magali Nasrawin
- Succeeded by: Abdullah Al-Amin

Personal details
- Born: 1937 (age 88–89) Baalbek, French Lebanon
- Party: Arab Socialist Ba'ath Party (1953–1966); Syria-based Ba'ath Party (Lebanon branch: 1966–2026); Arab Socialist Ba'ath Party – Lebanon Region (since 2026)
- Education: University of Zagreb

Assem Muhammad Qanso (Arabic: عاصم محمد قانصوه, born 1937) is a Lebanese politician. He is a former leader of the Lebanese Ba'ath Party.

== Political career ==
Qanso joined the Lebanese Ba'ath in 1953. During the Lebanese war, the Lebanese Ba'ath was divided into two hostile groups: a pro-Iraqi group and a pro-Syrian group. Qanso is staunchly pro-Syrian.

Relations between the Kataeb Party and the Ba'ath Party improved when on the orders of Karim Pakradouni (the leader of the Kataeb Party) and Qanso agreed to establish a committee between the two parties to discuss Lebanese and Arab politics. Relations improved further when the Syrian Ba'athist government increased its contacts with the Kataeb Party. During the Lebanese civil war, the Lebanese parliament formed the National Dialogue Committee in 1975; Qanso was a National Dialogue Committee representative. Qanso opposed the notion that the resignation of Suleiman Frangieh, the President of Lebanon, would end the conflict.

Following the death of Hafez al-Assad in 2000, notable figures such as Abdul Halim Khaddam and Ghazi Kanaan, supported Rafic Hariri against Émile Lahoud, the then sitting President of Lebanon, during the 2000 general election. Qanso supported Khaddam and Kanaan's position, and declared during a parliamentary session "there is no zaim [leader] but Rafik Hariri." On a later occasion, he stated: "It was a message to Lahoud that, if he tried to break Hariri, Kanaan would break Lahoud." He later changed his position and supported to extend Lahoud's mandate, and Qanso began criticising the opposition. Qanso warned Walid Jumblat that "you are not out of reach of our militants". Jumblat replied by stating it was the Ba'ath Party which had ordered the assassination of his father, Kamal Jumblatt.

== 2009 election and parliamentarian ==
There were discussions within the Ba'ath Party if Qanso was to give up his candidacy in the Baalbek-Hermel electoral district to Fayez Shukr, the leader of the Ba'ath Party. Qanso announced his candidacy for a seat in the Baalbek-Hermel electoral district in April 2009. In the 2009 parliamentary election, the Ba'ath Party won two seats as part of the March 8 Alliance; Qanso and Kassem Hachem. Qanso was elected to parliament in the Baalbek-Hermel district. The United States Government led by Barack Obama announced an extension of its travel ban and asset freeze against those seeking "to undermine Lebanon's legitimate and democratically elected government." Qanso was amongst those effected by the extension of sanctions. The Ba'ath Party which supports Najib Mikati, the then Prime Minister of Lebanon, claimed, through Qanso, that it "should have been represented in the [Mikati] government, just like the Syrian Social Nationalist Party".

== Syrian Civil War ==
Qanso supports the position of the United Nations Security Council which condemned the use of violence by the Ba'athist government, but which also called for ending the violence and holding those of fomenting the violence accountable. The decision to expel Syria from the Arab League was, according to Qanso, an American plot against Syria. Qanso condemned the Arab League sanctions towards Syria, and compared them to "complementary to the US plot against Syria, which targets its oil wealth." In an interview with MTV Lebanon Qanso accused a conspiracy centered around Lebanon First bloc MP Okab Sakr, Hani Hammoud, and Saad Hariri, former Prime Minister of Lebanon, of fomenting the uprising in Syria. He further claimed that there was no good reason for the Assad government to resign.

Qanso tried to persuade Mikati to expel Maura Connelly, the United States Ambassador to Lebanon, from the country in late 2011 because of the United States position towards Syria during the ongoing war. In the beginning of January 2012 Qanso claimed that al-Qaida had infiltrated more than 20 political organisations in Lebanon, this was in deep contrast to what Mikati stated when he claimed that Lebanon was "al-Qaida free". Qanso further claimed that "If Syria falls, the last resistance bastion will turn into a state similar to that of Egypt or Libya and will become a breeding ground for Salafis and [the Muslim Brotherhood]. On 30 January Qanso stated his believes that "The vast majority of [Syrian] people are with the Ba'ath Party that is tasked with protecting Syrian President Bashar Assad." At the same time he announced that the Lebanese Ba'ath Party would hold a conference on 7–8 February 2012 in Syria to discuss and approve the reform package which is planned to be introduced by Bashar al-Assad's government.
