= First cabinet of Rafic Hariri =

Lebanese cabinet between 1992 and 1995

Hariri I
- 61st Cabinet of Lebanon

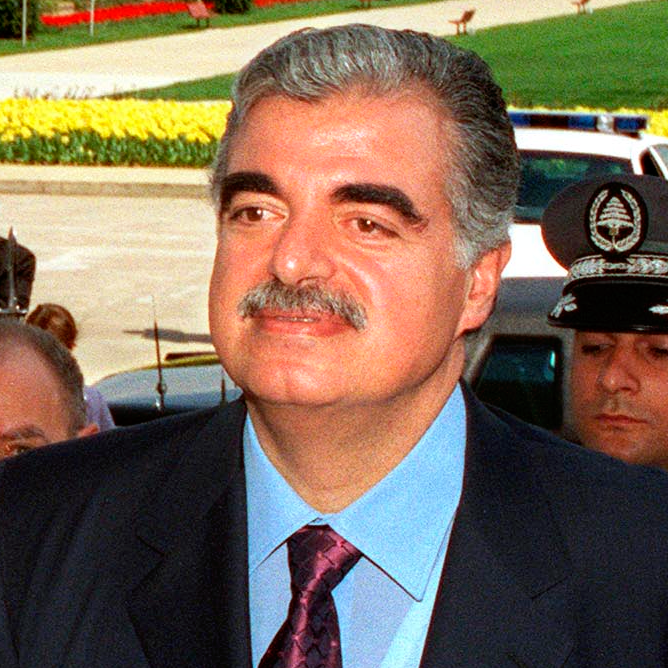
- Prime Minister Rafic Hariri
- Date formed: 31 October 1992
- Date dissolved: 25 May 1995

People and organisations
- Head of state: Elias Hrawi
- Head of government: Rafic Hariri
- Deputy head of government: Michel Murr
- No. of ministers: 31

History
- Predecessor: Rachid Solh II
- Successor: Second Cabinet of Rafic Hariri

The first cabinet of Rafic Hariri was the 61st government and one of the post-civil war governments of Lebanon. It was inaugurated on 31 October 1992 replacing the cabinet led by Rachid Solh.

Hariri's first cabinet lasted until 25 May 1995 and was succeeded by his second cabinet which would exist only until November 1996. The head of the state was president Elias Hrawi during the term of Hariri's first cabinet.

== Ministries and support ==
A number of new ministries was introduced through the establishment of the cabinet, including the state ministries for displaced, municipal affairs and ministry of public works. These institutions later had legal basis when the related laws were approved by the parliament.

Hariri's first cabinet was supported by nearly all Lebanese political parties which voted in favor of it at the parliament. The only political group which voted against the cabinet was Hezbollah.

== Cabinet members ==
Rafic Hariri's first cabinet was different from the previous Lebanese cabinets in that it did not follow the tradition of appointing the ministers based on their religious confession. Instead, the cabinet members were chosen by Hariri based on their eligibility for the posts.

Although the cabinet included some significant political figures, some of its members were technocrats and experts. Six cabinet members were part of the previous cabinet: Michel Murr, Marwan Hamadeh, Abdallah Al Amin, Fares Boueiz, Mohsen Dalloul and Michel Samaha. Nearly ten of newcomers were close allies of Prime Minister Rafic Hariri who also held the post of finance minister. Hariri's legal advisor and lawyer, Bahij Tabbara, was named as the justice minister. Three cabinet members were former militia leaders: Walid Jumblat, Elie Hobeika and Suleiman Franjieh, all of who were appointed minister of state.

In the cabinet there were two Armenian politicians: Shahé Barsoumian from the Tashnag Party and Hagop Demirdjian who was a member of the Armenian General Benevolent Union. The latter was also among the close confidants of Rafic Hariri. Georges Frem was the only cabinet member who was close to Nasrallah Boutros Sfeir, patriarch of the Maronite Church in Lebanon.

== List of ministers ==
The cabinet was made up of the following members:

Portfolio	Minister	Took office	Left office	Party
Prime Minister	Rafic Hariri	31 October 1992	25 May 1995	
Deputy Prime Minister	Michel Murr	31 October 1992	25 May 1995	
Minister of Finance	Rafic Hariri	31 October 1992	25 May 1995	
Minister of the Interior	Bishara Merhej	31 October 1992	2 September 1994	Independent
Minister of the Interior	Michel Murr	2 September 1994	25 May 1995	
Minister of Justice	Bahij Tabbara	31 October 1992	25 May 1995	Independent
Minister of Foreign Affairs and Emigrants	Fares Boueiz	31 October 1992	25 May 1995	Independent
Minister of Defense	Mohsen Dalloul	31 October 1992	25 May 1995	Progressive Socialist Party
Minister of Housing and Cooperatives	Mahmoud Abu Hamdan	31 October 1992	25 May 1995	Amal
Minister of National Education and Fine Arts	Mikhael Daher	31 October 1992	25 May 1995	
Minister of Health and Social Affairs	Marwan Hamadeh	31 October 1992	25 May 1995	Progressive Socialist Party
Minister of Labour	Abdullah Al Amin	31 October 1992	25 May 1995	Arab Socialist Ba'ath Party – Lebanon Region
Minister of Industry and Petroleum	Assad Rizk	31 October 1992	25 May 1995	
Minister of Agriculture	Adil Qortas	31 October 1992	25 May 1995	
Minister of Economy and Trade	Hagop Demirdjian	31 October 1992	25 May 1995	
Minister of Information	Michel Samaha	31 October 1992	25 May 1995	Kataeb
Minister of Public Works and Transportation	Muhammad Bassam Murtada	31 October 1992	25 May 1995	
Minister of Post and Telecommunications	Muhammad Ghaziri	31 October 1992	25 May 1995	
Minister of Electricity and Water Resources	Georges Frem	31 October 1992	11 June 1993	
Minister of Electricity and Water Resources	Elie Hobeika	11 June 1993	25 May 1995	Promise Party
Minister of Tourism	Nicholas Fattoush	31 October 1992	25 May 1995	Independent
Minister of State	Ali Osseiran	31 October 1992	25 May 1995	Amal
Minister of State	Shahé Barsoumian	31 October 1992	2 September 1994	Tashnag Party
Minister of State	Bishara Merhej	2 September 1994	25 May 1995	Independent
Minister of State	Anwar Al Khalil	31 October 1992	25 May 1995	
Minister of State for Social Affairs and the Handicapped	Elie Hobeika	31 October 1992	2 September 1994	Promise Party
Minister of State for Social Affairs and the Handicapped	Shahé Barsoumian	2 September 1994	25 May 1995	Tashnag Party
Minister of State for Financial Affairs	Fouad Siniora	31 October 1992	25 May 1995	
Minister of State for Vocational and Technical Training	Hassan Izzedin	31 October 1992	25 May 1995	
Minister of State for Cultural Affairs and Higher Education	Michel Eddé	31 October 1992	25 May 1995	
Minister of State for Transportation	Omar Miskawi	31 October 1992	25 May 1995	
Minister of State for Emigrant Affairs	Rida Wahid	31 October 1992	25 May 1995	
Minister of State for Environmental Affairs	Samir Mouqbel	31 October 1992	25 May 1995	Independent
Minister of State for Municipalities and Villages	Suleiman Frangieh	31 October 1992	25 May 1995	Marada Movement
Minister of State for Affairs of the Displaced	Walid Jumblatt	31 October 1992	25 May 1995	Progressive Socialist Party

== Resignations and removals ==
Georges Frem, minister of electricity and water resources, was removed from the post in June 1993 which caused the harsh criticisms by Maronite patriarch Nasrallah Boutros Sfeir against Rafic Hariri.
