= Bahia Hariri =

Lebanese politician

- بهية الحريري
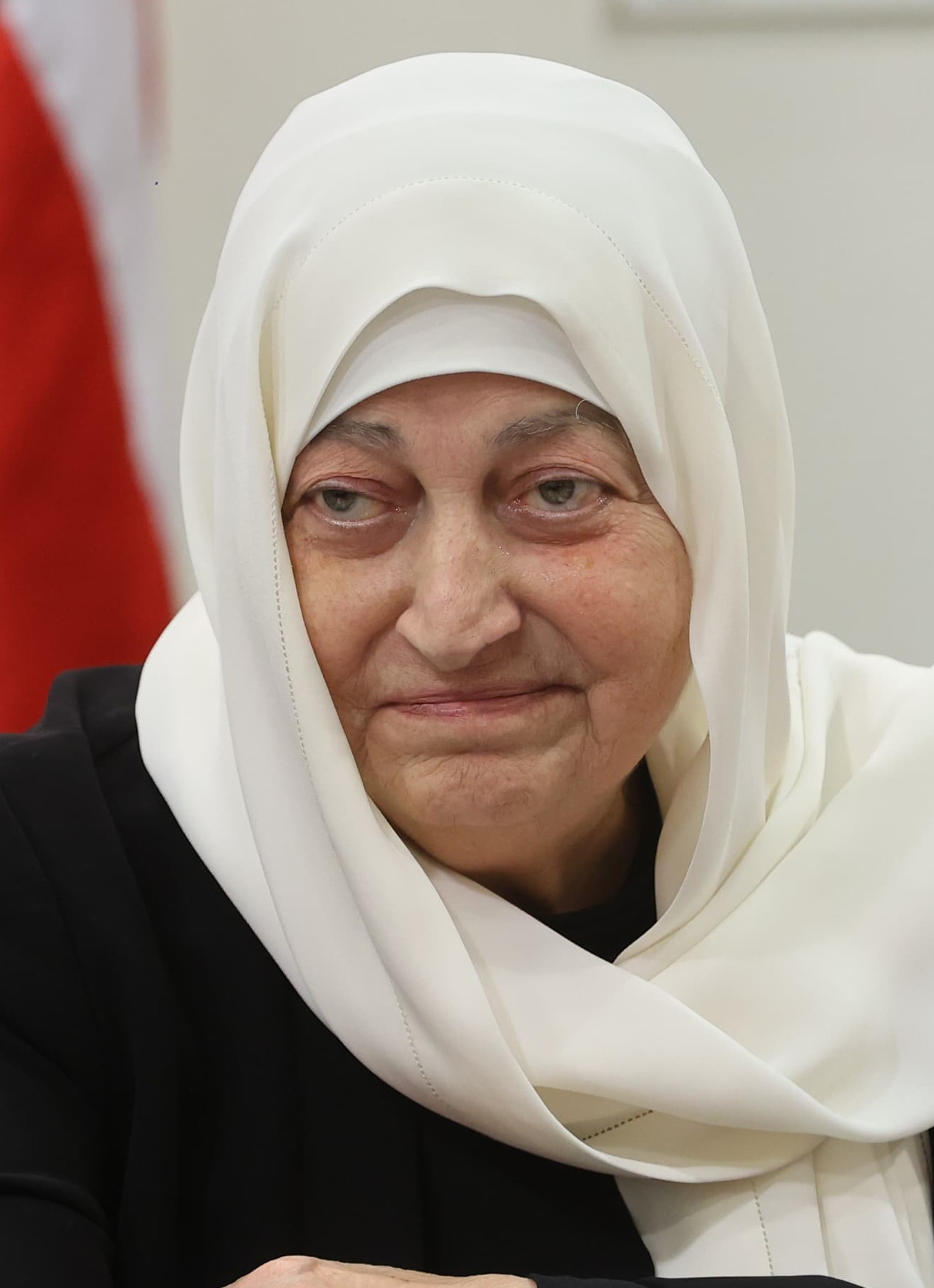
- Hariri in 2025

Leader of the Future Movement in the Parliament of Lebanon
- In office 7 May 2018 – 21 May 2022
- Preceded by: Fouad Siniora

Minister of Education and Higher Learning
- In office 11 July 2008 – 9 November 2009
- Prime Minister: Fouad Siniora
- Preceded by: Khaled Kabbani
- Succeeded by: Hassan Mneimneh

Member of the Lebanese Parliament
- In office 23 August 1992 – 21 May 2022
- Constituency: Sidon (1992, 1996, 2000, 2005, 2009, 2018)

Personal details
- Born: 23 June 1952 (age 73) Sidon, Lebanon
- Party: Future Movement
- Spouse: Mustafa Hariri

Bahia Hariri (Arabic: بهية الحريري; born 26 June 1952) is a Lebanese politician and sister of former Lebanese Prime Minister Rafik Hariri.

== Early life and education ==
Bahia Hariri was born in Sidon, Lebanon, on 23 June 1952 to a Sunni Muslim family. Her two brothers are Shafic and Rafik Hariri. She graduated from the Teacher Training College in Sidon.

== Career ==
Hariri worked as a teacher upon graduation in Sidon and southern Lebanon until 1979. She then headed the Hariri Foundation in Sidon, founded by her brother Rafik Hariri in 1979. The foundation is a major educational and charitable institution.

In 1992, Hariri was elected as member of Parliament for the Sunni seat in Saida. She was reelected in 1996 and 2000 for the same seat. From July 2008 to November 2009 she was the minister of education.

She was again elected to Parliament in June 2009. She headed the Parliamentary commission for education and culture in the Lebanese Parliament, in addition to being member of the Parliamentary commission for foreign and immigration affairs. She is also a goodwill ambassador for UNESCO, and heads the Islamic Organization for Higher Education. She serves on the Advisory Council of World Links Arab Region.

== Personal life ==
Bahia Hariri was married to her cousin Mustafa Hariri who died April 2024. They married in 1973 and have four children: Nader (born 1976), Ghena (born 1979), Ahmad (born 1983) and Ola (1988).

== Awards and distinctions ==
- Légion d'honneur (2003)
- The Aga Khan Award for Architecture, in recognition of the reconstruction of The Big Omary Mosque (1989)
- Lebanese Cedar Award, Lieutenant rank, in recognition of services in Social and Cultural fields (1989)
- The Golden Apple Award from the World Federation of Travel Journalists and Writers
- Honorary Doctorate from the American University of Science and Technology (2010)
