= 1968 Lebanese general election in Chouf District =

Voting to elect eight members of the Lebanese parliament took place in Chouf District on April 7, 1968, as part of the national general election of that year. Three of the seats of the constituency were earmarked for the Maronite community, two for the Sunni Muslim, two for the Druze whilst the last seat was allocated to the Greek Catholics (for more information about the Lebanese election system, see Elections in Lebanon). The Chouf District constituency had 78,557 eligible voters, out of whom 46,056 voted (the highest number of all constituencies in the country). All in all Chouf District was one of the most hotly contested constituencies in the election, being the home turf of Camille Chamoun and Kamal Jumblatt. The situation in the constituency was tense (the Jumblatt camp had warned of an armed uprising if Chamoun would have been declared the winner), but the polls went through without violent incidents. However, Jumblatt did accuse 'a large embassy in Beirut' (probably an allusion to the U.S. embassy) of buying votes for Chamoun.

== Candidates ==
24 candidates took part in the election. The contest was mainly between the tickets headed by Chamoun and Jumblatt, with the candidates of the third list lagging far behind in gathering the votes of the local electorate. Camille Chamoun was the leader of the National Liberal Party and a former president of the republic. The Druze strongman Kamal Jumblatt was the leader of the Progressive Socialist Party and the National Struggle Front.

=== Maronite seats ===
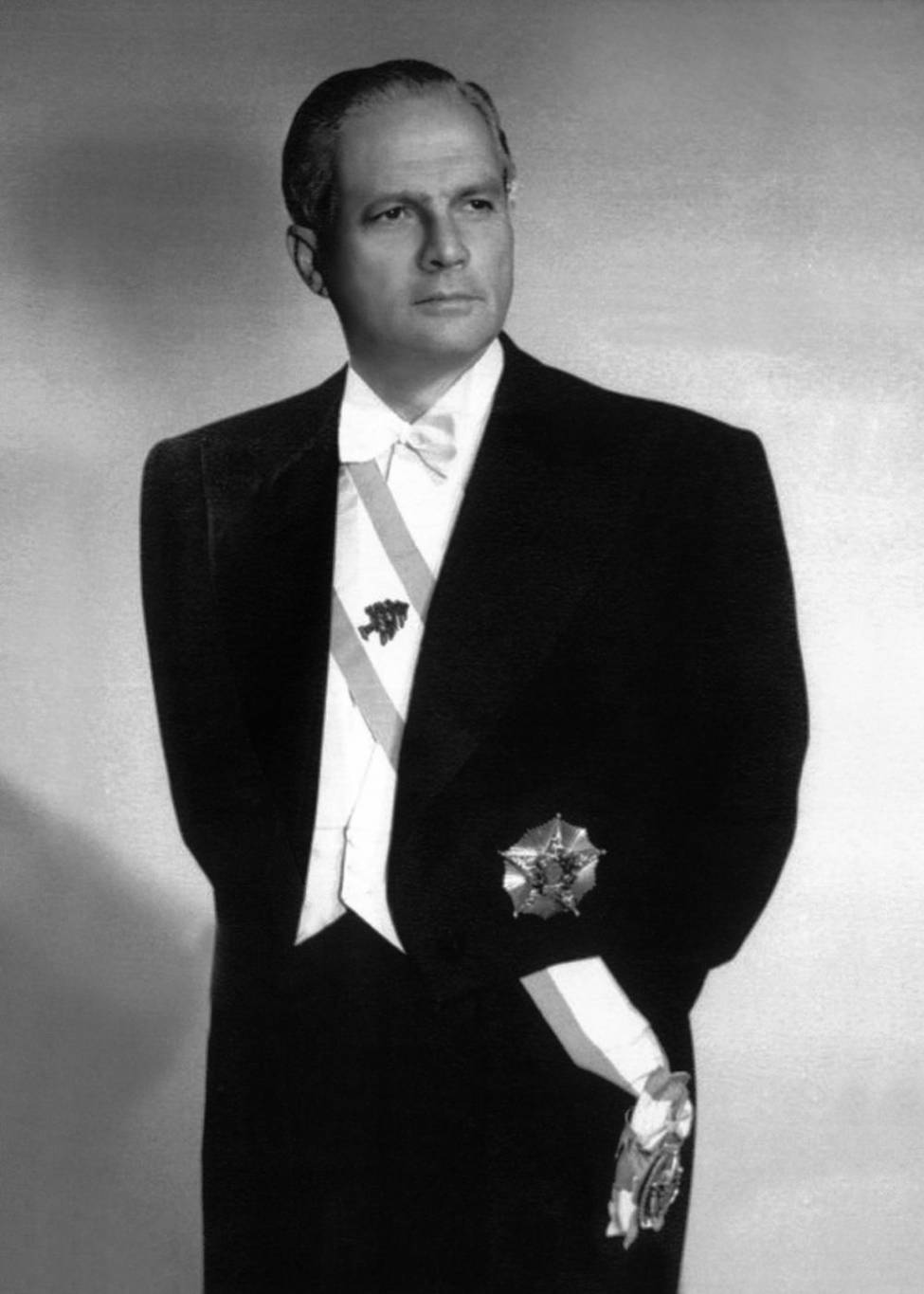
Camille Chamoun

Camille Chamoun sought re-election from the Chouf District. His Maronite running mates were Sami al-Bustani and Halim al-Ghafari. Al-Bustani was an incumbent parliamentarian from the National Liberal Party. Professionally he was an engineer. The lawyer al-Ghafari contested elections for the first time.

Jumblatt fielded three Maronites linked to the National Struggle Front, out of whom one (Aziz Awn) was an incumbent parliamentarian since 1960. The 65-year-old Awn was a physician by profession. The two other Maronite candidates of the National Struggle Front, Suleiman al-Bustani and Fu'ad at-Tahini, were lawyers by profession.

=== Sunni seats ===
Jumblatt's ticket featured the two incumbent Sunni Muslim parliamentarians from Chouf. The first Sunni Muslim candidate on the Jumblatt ticket was the Minister of Water and Electricity and longtime parliamentarian Anwar al-Khatib. His Sunni running mate was the former diplomat Muhammad al-Barjawi.

Chamoun's Sunni Muslim candidates were Issam al-Hajjar and Hassan al-Qa'qur. The 36-year-old lawyer al-Hajjar had been elected to parliament in the 1960 election, but then as a candidate of Kamal Jumblatt. Al-Qa'qur worked in the civil service, who had made a previous attempt to run for parliament in the 1964 election.

=== Druze seats ===
Kamal Jumblatt was a traditional Druze leader and landlord. At the time of the 1968 elections, he had only lost his parliamentary seat once. His Druze running mate was Bahij Taqiuddin, lawyer, former minister and incumbent parliamentarian linked to the National Struggle Front. Chamoun's two Druze candidates were the landlord Muhammad Arslan and the engineer Qathan Himadih (the latter was informally linked to the National Liberal Party).

=== Greek Catholic seat ===
The incumbent Greek Catholic parliamentarian was Joseph Mghabghab of the National Liberal Party. He ran as the Greek Catholic candidate on Chamoun's ticket. He was challenged by the former parliamentarian Salim Abd an-Nur from the Jumblatt ticket.

== Results ==
Five candidates from the Jumblatt ticket and three candidates from the Chamoun ticket were elected.

Candidate	Sect	Ticket	Votes	Elected?
Kamal Jumblatt	Druze	Jumblatt	24,874	check
Camille Chamoun	Maronite	Chamoun	23,398	check
Aziz Awn	Maronite	Jumblatt	23,310	check
Issam al-Hajjar	Sunni	Chamoun	23,259	check
Bahij Taqiuddin	Druze	Jumblatt	22,929	check
Anwar al-Khatib	Sunni	Jumblatt	22,914	check
Joseph Moghabghab	Greek Catholic	Chamoun	22,862	check
Fu'ad at-Tahini	Maronite	Jumblatt	22,811	check
Salim Abd an-Nur	Greek Catholic	Jumblatt	22,738	
Suleiman al-Bustani	Maronite	Jumblatt	22,562	
Hassan al-Qa'qur	Sunni	Chamoun	22,294	
Muhammad al-Barjawi	Sunni	Jumblatt	21,859	
Sami al-Bustani	Maronite	Chamoun	21,663	
Qahtan Himadih	Druze	Chamoun	21,318	
Muhammaed Arslan	Druze	Chamoun	21,191	
Halim al-Ghafari	Maronite	Chamoun	20,087	
Victor Gharib	Maronite		1,826	
Issam Karam	Maronite		1,275	
Mustafa Imad	Druze		1,061	
Abd al-Ghaffar al-Hajjar	Sunni		989	
Antoine ash-Shuwayri	Maronite		422	
Fu'ad Haddad			105	
Yusuf Sarkis	Maronite		29	
Naji al-Bustani	Maronite		5	

== See also ==
- 1971 Chouf parliamentary by-election
