= Anwar al-Khatib (Lebanon) =

Anwar al-Khatib (Arabic: أنور الخطيب 1910 – November 14, 1970) was a Lebanese Sunni Muslim lawyer, politician and former cabinet minister.

== Early life and education ==
Anwar al-Khatib was born in 1910 at the town of Chehim, the Capital of the Iqlim al-Kharrub coastal enclave, in the Chouf District. He was the son of the Sunni member of parliament (MP) Ahmad al-Khatib, who was elected to the Lebanese Parliament in 1937, during the French Mandate for Syria and the Lebanon.

Al-Khatib graduated from St. Joseph University. He became a prominent lawyer and taught at the Lebanese University. He wrote articles for many Lebanese publications, in particular in al-Hurriah.

== Career ==
=== Political activism ===
Politically he was an ally of the Druze Za'im (Political boss) Kamal Jumblatt. Al-Khatib contested every parliamentary election between 1951 and 1968 and was defeated only twice. His constituency was the Chouf District.

=== Cabinet minister ===
In 1968 he was appointed minister of water and electricity.

== Death ==
Anwar al-Khatib died on November 14, 1970, at the age of 60. After his death, his son Zahir al-Khatib won his seat in the 1971 Chouf parliamentary by-election.

== See also ==
- Toilers League
- Progressive Socialist Party
- Mountain War (Lebanon)
- Lebanese Civil War
