= Daraya, Chouf =

Daraya داريا
- Village
- Location in Lebanon
- Coordinates: 33°38′45″N 35°30′11″E
- Country: Lebanon
- Governorate: Mount Lebanon
- District: Chouf
- Elevation: 2,600 ft (800 m)
- Time zone: UTC+2 (EET)
  - Summer (DST): +3

Daraya (Arabic: داريا, romanized: Dārayā), also known as Dheira, is a Lebanese village located in Chouf District in Mount Lebanon Governorate. The name is derived from "Dar" which means house or home.

== Location ==
Daraya belongs to the Chouf District; it is linked with the Lebanese coast by Al-Jiyya-Barja, Saydata-Dibbiyeh, and Wadi Zeina-Shheem roads. It is located 12 km away from Beit ed-Dine, 35 km from Baabda and 40 km away from Beirut. Daraya is 600–800 meters above the sea level.

== Area and population ==
Its area is about 481.5 hectares and most of the area consists of hills. Highlands are planted with olives, grapevines and figs, while plains are planted with vegetables. There are also some small woods. The population is about 4132 persons. Nearly half of them have the right to vote.
