= Omar Miskawi =

Lebanese lawyer and politician (born 1935)

Minister of Transport
- In office 1996–1998
- Prime Minister: Rafic Hariri

State Minister for Transport
- In office 1992–1996
- Prime Minister: Rafic Hariri

Personal details
- Born: Omar Kamel Miskawi; 1935 (age 90–91) Tripoli, Lebanon
- Children: 3
- Education: Cairo University; Al-Azhar University

Omar Miskawi (born 1935) is a Lebanese lawyer and politician who was a member of the Lebanese Parliament. He served as the minister of state for transport and then minister of transport from 1992 to 1998. He is a long-term deputy head of the Higher Islamic Council.

== Early life and education ==
Miskawi was born in Tripoli in 1935. He graduated from Cairo University receiving a degree in law in 1961. He also graduated from Al-Azhar University.

== Career ==
Miskawi started his career as a lawyer in Tripoli in 1961. He was a member of the municipality of Tripoli. He became a member of the Higher Council of Islamic Sharia in 1964. He was elected a member of the Parliament from Tripoli in the 1992 elections. He won his seat again in the 1996 elections.

Miskawi was appointed state minister for transport to the first cabinet of Rafic Hariri in 1992. He was named as the minister of transport in 1996 in the third cabinet led by Hariri. Miskawi's term ended in 1998.

Miskawi is the deputy head of the Higher Islamic Council.

== Personal life ==
Miskawi is married to Mona Abdulghani Oubar, and they have three daughters.
