= Bishara Merhej =

Lebanese politician (born 1946)

Minister of State for Administrative Reform
- In office 7 November 1996 – 4 December 1998
- Prime Minister: Rafik Hariri

Minister of State
- In office 2 September 1994 – 25 May 1995
- Prime Minister: Rafik Hariri
- Preceded by: Shahé Barsoumian

Minister of Interior
- In office 31 October 1992 – 2 September 1994
- Prime Minister: Rafik Hariri
- Succeeded by: Michel Murr

Personal details
- Born: Bishara Jamil Merhej; 1946 (age 79–80) Beirut, Lebanon
- Party: Al Baath Arab Socialist Party (until 1973)
- Spouse: Wali Grote
- Children: 2
- Education: American University of Beirut

Bishara Merhej (born 1946) is a Lebanese journalist and politician who held various cabinet posts, including minister of interior. He also served at the Lebanese parliament in the 1990s.

== Early life and education ==
Merhej was born in Beirut in 1946. He hails from a Greek Orthodox family. His parents were Jamil Merhej and Salma Matar Rahbani.

Merhej obtained a degree in economics from the American University of Beirut in 1967.

== Career ==
Following his graduation Merhej first worked as a teacher. Then he began to work as a journalist and wrote articles for the economy section of Al Anwar. He is cofounder of the Active Arab Front and joined the Al Baath Arab Socialist Party where he served in different capacities until 1973. In 1975 he involved in the establishment of the Assembly of Popular Leagues and Association which supported a united Lebanon and Arab identity of the country.

Merhej was elected to the Parliament in the elections of 1992 and 1996 representing Beirut. At the parliament he was a member of the human rights committee. On 31 October 1992 he was appointed interior minister to the first cabinet of Rafik Hariri who selected him to the post. In a reshuffle Merhej was named state minister on 2 September 1994. Merhej was the minister of state for administrative reform in the third cabinet of Hariri between 7 November 1996 and 4 December 1998.

== Personal life ==
Merhej is married to Wali Grote, a physician, with who he has two daughters.
