= Inaya Ezzeddine =

Lebanese politician

- عناية عزالدين

Member of the Lebanese Parliament

Chair of the Women and Children Parliamentary Committee
- Incumbent
- Assumed office 16 October 2018

State Minister for Administrative Reform
- In office 18 December 2016 – 31 January 2019
- President: Michel Aoun
- Prime Minister: Saad Hariri

Personal details
- Born: Beirut, Lebanon
- Party: Amal Movement
- Education: American University of Beirut

Inaya Ezzeddine (Arabic: عناية عز الدين) is a Lebanese politician and doctor who serves as member of parliament since 2018. A member of Amal Movement, she has served as minister of state for administrative reform in the second cabinet of Saad Hariri from 2016 to 2019. She chairs the women and children parliamentary committee. In 2020, French President Emmanuel Macron awarded her the Legion of Honor.

== See also ==
- Paula Yacoubian
- Nabih Berri
