= Salim Abd an-Nur =

Lebanese Greek Catholic politician

Member of the Parliament of Lebanon Parliament for Chouf District
- In office 1959–1964

Salim Abd an-Nur (Arabic: سالم عبد النور), a Lebanese Greek Catholic politician. He graduated from the Jesuit School in Beirut, after which he pursued a business career. His political life began in 1959, when he successfully ran for parliament in the by-poll in Chouf District after the killing on the incumbent parliamentarian Na'im Mghabghab. He was re-elected in 1960 as a Progressive Socialist Party candidate, but was defeated in 1964 and 1968. He managed to retake his seat in the 1972 elections.
