= Jahlieh =

Jahlieh جاهلية Al-Jaheliyyeh, al-Jahiliya
- Location in Lebanon
- Coordinates: 33°39′58″N 35°31′6″E
- Country: Lebanon
- Governorate: Mount Lebanon
- District: Chouf

Population
  - Total: 5,500

Jahlieh (Levantine Arabic: جاهلية, romanized: Jāhliyeh) is a village in the Chouf District of the Mount Lebanon Governorate in Lebanon, located 35 kilometers (22 mi) southeast of Beirut with an altitude ranging between 400 and 650 meters (1,310 and 2,130 ft) above sea level and a total land area of 250 hectares (620 acres). Jahlieh is bordered by villages of Daraya, Binwayte, Deir Dourit, Baakline.

The population is around 5,500 and the number of houses is around 600. Its inhabitants are predominantly Druze.

Between the villages of Jahlieh, Baaklin and Deir Dourit, Bkerzay is a domain created by Ramzi Salman, architect and entrepreneur whose objective is to revitalize this green rural spot by preserving and promoting Lebanese vernacular architecture, local crafts, terroir products and nature conservation. The domain includes a stone guest houses hotel, restaurants, a piazza with shops and café, a pottery workshop, a pottery learning workshop, a traditional hammam, outdoor heated pools and hiking trails combined between the woods of Berzay and the adjacent Herch Baakline reserve. The project was started in 2010 and has grown into a green preservation village in 2017. Salman, helped by local peasants Nabil Chaaya, Youssef Mallat and Selim Mouzannar has transformed Bkerzay into a noticeable eco-tourism destination in the Chouf mountains, Lebanon.
