= Joseph Mghabghab =

Lebanese Greek Catholic lawyer and politician

Joseph Moghabghab (Arabic: جوزف مغبغب, born 1930), a Lebanese Greek Catholic lawyer and politician, belonging to the National Liberal Party. Moghabghab was elected to parliament in 1964 and 1968. Moghabghab was one of the most outspoken critics of the Cairo Agreement, labeling it unconstitutional.
