= Aali en Nahri =

Aali en Nahri علي النهري
- Village
- Location in Lebanon
- Coordinates: 33°51′30″N 36°01′50″E
- Country: Lebanon
- Governorate: Beqaa Governorate
- District: Zahlé
- Elevation: 3,120 ft (950 m)
- Time zone: UTC+2 (EET)
  - Summer (DST): +3

Aali en Nahri (Arabic: علي النهري, romanized: ʿAlī an-Nahrī) is a village located in the Zahlé District of the Beqaa Governorate in eastern Lebanon.

== History ==
In 1838, Eli Smith noted 'Aly en-Nahry as a Metawileh village in the Baalbek area. As of 2014, the town had 6,626 register voters, 98.41% of whom were Shiites.

== Bibliography ==
- Robinson, E.; Smith, E. (1841). Biblical Researches in Palestine, Mount Sinai and Arabia Petraea: A Journal of Travels in the year 1838. Vol. 3. Boston: Crocker & Brewster.
