= Abdallah Al Amin =

Lebanese politician

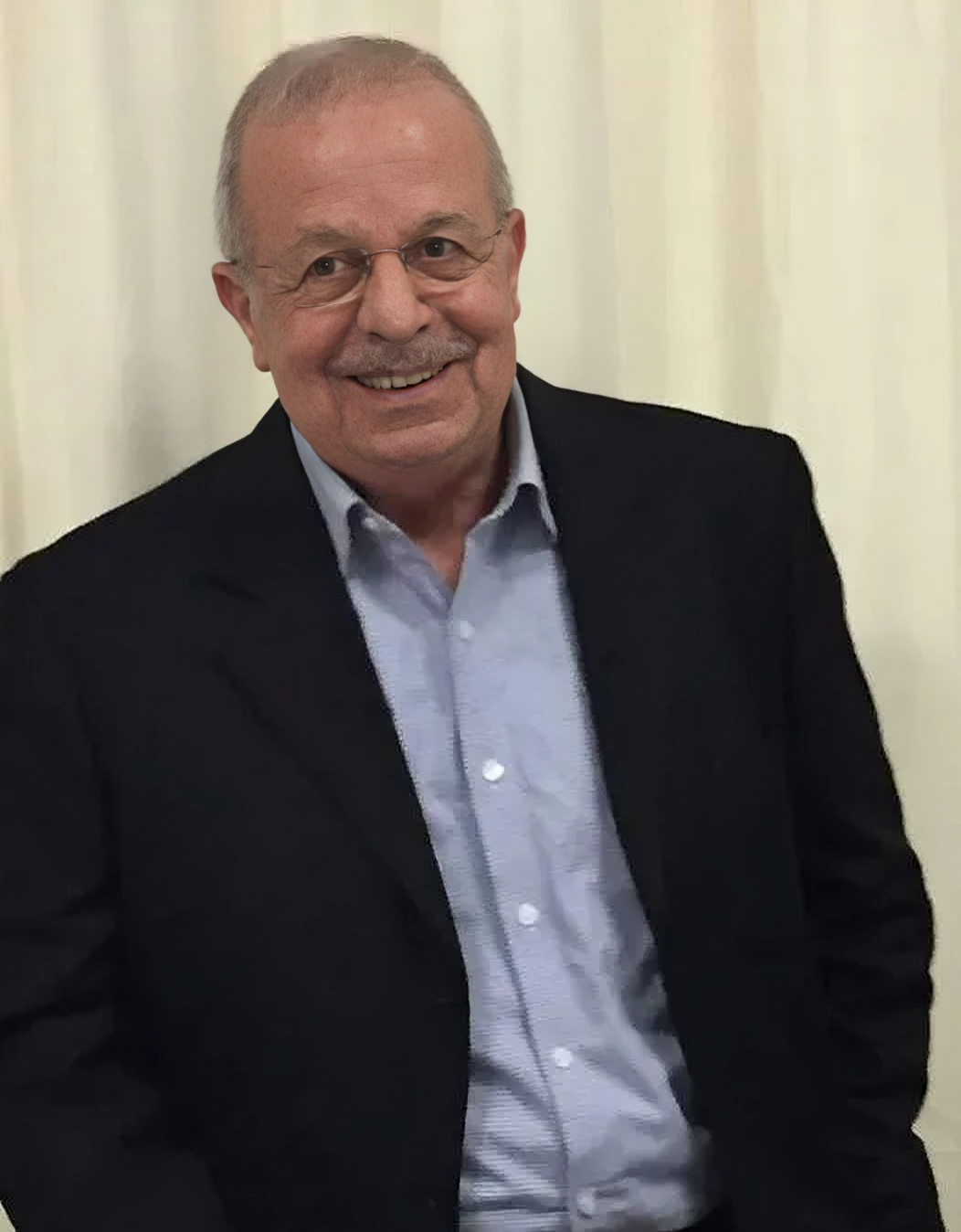
Abdallah Al Amin; Former Minister of Labour, Member of Parliament, and Leader of the Lebanese Ba'ath Party

Abdallah Mohamad Al Amin (Arabic: عبدالله محمّد الأمين; October 30, 1946 – January 23, 2023) was an author and a Lebanese politician who served as Minister of Labor, Minister of State, Member of the Parliament of Lebanon, and former leader of the Lebanese Arab Ba'ath Socialist party.

== Early life and education ==
Abdallah was born on October 30, 1946, to the well-known Al Amin Sayyid family in Souaneh, Lebanon. He was the son of Mohamad Al Amin, a landowner. Al Amin went to school in Tebnine in Southern Lebanon, then graduated with a degree in Arabic literature from the Beirut Arab University. After graduation, Al Amin was a teacher and writer before his entry into politics.

== Political career ==
Al Amin joined the Ba'ath party in his early years, advancing through ranks over time, aligning himself with the pro-Syrian faction rather than the pro-Iraqi faction. This alignment influenced his political career, shaping his relationships within the party and guiding the policies and positions he supported. Al Amin had a strong and influential relationship with Hafez Al-Assad, the then-President of Syria. This alliance helped bolster his position within the party. Al Amin supported Assad's policies and contributed to implementing several initiatives aligned with Syrian interests. This close relationship enabled him to gain significant political support, but it also made him a target for criticism from other factions within the party that opposed Syrian influence.

Al Amin became party leader of the Lebanese Ba'ath Party in 1989 till 1993. He was elected as a member of the Lebanese Parliament representing the Bint Jbeil region. He served as Minister of State in Omar Karami’s government from 1990 to 1992, and then as Minister of Labour in Rashid Solh’s cabinet between May and October 1992. Later, Al Amin assumed the office of Minister of Labour in the first cabinet of Prime Minister Rafik Hariri, formed on 31 October 1992, serving until 25 May 1995.

As labour minister, he was mandated by the government to negotiate with Palestinian representatives over civil rights; he also served on a ministerial committee addressing the status of Palestinian refugees. In April 1995 he stated that Lebanon rejects indigenization and that refugees “must return to Palestine.”

In November 1993 the Ministry of Labour reached an agreement with the General Confederation of Lebanese Workers (GCWL) covering wage increases, benefits, and price controls, though the government subsequently failed to implement it fully.

In the period leading up to Lebanon's first post-civil-war parliamentary elections in 1992, al-Amin was cited in Lebanese press coverage discussing the political climate of the time. Political scientist Farid el-Khazen references a 29 June 1992 newspaper report noting “Minister Abdallah al-Amin’s position,” highlighting his public role among government figures during the pre-election period.

In his memoirs, President Elias Hrawi describes Abdallah al-Amin—then Minister of State in Omar Karami’s cabinet—as the “carrier of the Syrian password” in the Council of Ministers, and notes that al-Amin advocated granting the Deputy Prime Minister adequate powers to ensure cabinet continuity when the Prime Minister is absent.

== Political ideology ==
Abdallah Al Amin had a political ideology that closely aligned with the Ba'ath Arab Socialist Party, which emphasises Arab unity and socialism. By supporting Hafez Al-Assad, Al Amin endorsed policies that bolstered Syrian influence in the region and promoted Arab unity. Al Amin's alignment with the Ba'ath Party's ideology also reflected a commitment to a unify Arab nations under a single political and economic framework. His support for Assad's regime was rooted in a shared vision of a strong Arab identity and resistance against external influences. This ideological framework not only shaped him political actions but also influenced the broader dynamics of the region, as the Ba'ath Party sought to promote a pan-Arab agenda. However, the complexities of regional politics led to tensions, especially with groups that advocated for different forms of governance or opposed Syrian dominance in Lebanon.

Al Amin was known for his leftist political views and his support for the Palestinian cause. He was a vocal critic of Israel's treatment of the Palestinian people and worked to raise awareness of the situation. He was known for his principled stances on a range of political issues.

== Books ==
In addition to his political work, Abdallah Al Amin was also a writer. His books and essays explored a wide range of topics, from politics and society to literature and culture. His writing was marked by commitment to social justice and a desire to use his platform to raise awareness of the issues facing his country and his people.

Abdallah published two political books in his lifetime: "Why Lebanon?" (Arabic: "لماذا لبنان؟") and "A Nation on a Hot Tin Roof" (Arabic: "وطن فوق صفيح ساخن") which discuss politics and philosophy within the context of Lebanon, analysing the political and social challenges facing the country, offering critical insights into the political situation in the region and its impact on national identity.

== Family ==
Abdallah has two sons and a daughter. His son, Mohamad, is a US-sanctioned figure due to his alleged ties to Hezbollah.

== Death ==
Abdallah Al Amin's political career was marked by several controversies. He survived three assassination attempts, allegedly orchestrated by his rivals. The first two attempts involved car bombs placed under his home, while the third attempt was an explosion to his convoy.

Abdallah Al Amin died on January 23, 2023, after suffering illness from illness and months of treatment at the American University Hospital. His funeral took place the next day in his hometown Souaneh with a large presence of politicians, journalists and supporters.
