= Dahr El Maghara =

Dahr El Maghara ﺿﻬﺮ ﺍﻟﻤﻐﺎﺭﺓ
- Village
- Location within Lebanon
- Coordinates: 33°41′N 35°27′E
- Country: Lebanon
- Governorate: Mount Lebanon Governorate
- District: Chouf District
- Time zone: UTC+2 (EET)
  - Summer (DST): UTC+3 (EEST)
- Dialing code: +961

Dahr El Maghara (also spelled Dahr El Mghara or Dahr Al Magharah; Arabic: ﺿﻬﺮ ﺍﻟﻤﻐﺎﺭﺓ) is a small Lebanese Christian village that is located 33°41′N 35°27′E, about 20 km south of Beirut in the Chouf region of Mount Lebanon.

The village is mainly home to the Dagher family, although new construction around the area has led to numerous other families calling the village home. The village felt the wrath of the Lebanese Civil War (1975–1990) which led half the population to migrate to Australia, Canada and other areas of Lebanon (although strong ties between the Dagher family in Australia and Canada to the small village remain).

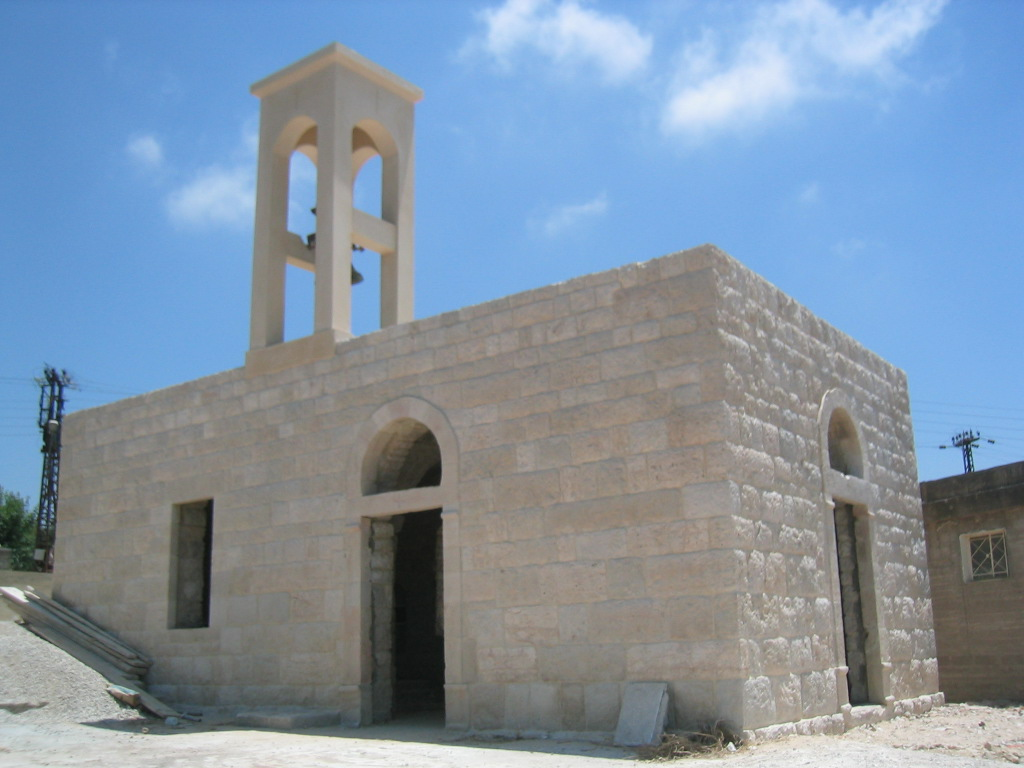
St. Elias Church Dahr El Maghara

== See also ==
- Chouf
