= Dibbiyeh =

Debbiyeh الدبية
- Municipality
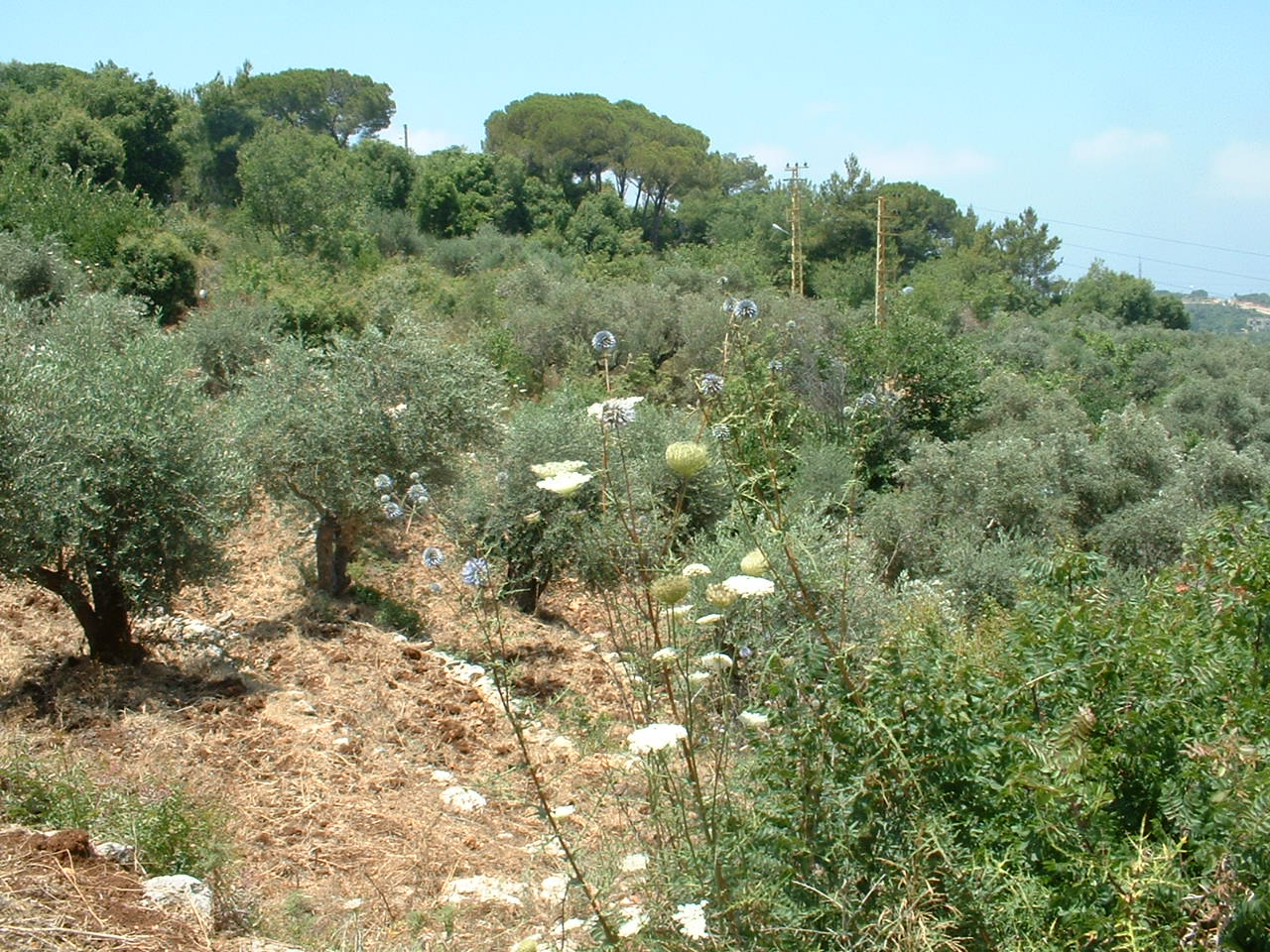
- Typical flora in Debbieh

- Location within Lebanon
- Coordinates: 33.665854°N 35.487857°E
- Country: Lebanon
- Governorate: Mount Lebanon
- District: Chouf District

Government
  - Mayor: Nabil Boustany

Area
  - Total: 16.61 km^{2} (6.41 sq mi)
- Time zone: UTC+2 (EET)
  - Summer (DST): UTC+3 (EEST)
- Postal code: 5664
- Dialing code: +9617
- Website: https://debbiyehmunicipality.gov.lb/

Dibbiyeh or Debbiyeh (Arabic: الدبية) is a Lebanese village in the Iqlim al-Kharrub part of the Chouf district mountains, located roughly 30 kilometers south of Beirut, Lebanon. It is considered to be a midway point between the capital and the rest of Mount Lebanon. Debbiyeh is bordered by the towns of Saadiyat and Dahr-el-Mghara to the east and south and the town of Bourjein to the west and north. The town is one of the largest municipalities in Lebanon by surface size. Fairuz, a popular Lebanese singer, recounted spending summers in Dibbiyeh with her grandmother as a child.

== Etymology ==
The town's name is derived from "Ze'biyeh", which in Aramaic means "the place of wolves". It is believed that it used to be home to a large number of grey wolves in the past.

== Churches ==
The town contains four Maronite Catholic churches. St Joseph's Maronite Church lies in the middle of the small village square, and the new Chapel of the Divine Mercy is directly opposite, while St Maroun's Maronite Church lies on the northern part of the town. St Aabda's Maronite Church lies near the Fkheity River also on the northern side.

== Educational institutes ==
=== Beirut Arab University ===
BAU Debbiyeh Site is located 33 kilometers away from the university's main site in Beirut. The land has an area of 1,353,000 m2. The highest point is 404 m above sea level, while the lowest point is 154 m above sea level. The total built up area is 50.000 m2. The compound consists of 3 buildings which hold the Faculties of Architectural Engineering, Engineering and Science, 2 buildings for students' dorms, 2 buildings for instructors' dorms, a Gymnasium, a mosque, an observatory, a bank, an outdoor cafeteria and a maintenance building.

Faculty of Architectural Engineering Building: The building has an area of 10.300 m2. It is composed of 4 storeys. It contains administrative and teaching rooms in addition to 5 studios, a festivities hall with the capacity of 300 seats, 3 computer laboratories, and a library.

Faculty of Engineering and Science Building: The building has an area of 17.300 m2. It is composed of 6 stories and contains administrative and teaching rooms, a studio, 13 laboratories, 4 computer laboratories, a 660-m2 library, an auditorium with the capacity of 500 students and other two auditoriums with the capacity of 225 students each.

Faculty of Science Laboratories Building: The building has an area of 6,500 m2. It is composed of 4 stories and contains teaching rooms, 15 laboratories and 4 computer laboratories.
