= Bourjein et Marjiyat =

Bourjein - Marjiyat (Arabic: البرجين والمريجات, romanized: al-Burjayn wa al-Marjiyāt) is a populated area in the Chouf District of Lebanon. The area is approximately 300 meters high and has a school with about 80 students which closed at the time of Lebanese civil war.
