= Kassem Hachem =

Lebanese politician

Kassem Hachem (Arabic: قاسم هاشم; born 1960) is a Lebanese politician, member of the Arab Socialist Baath Party.

== Biography ==
Hachem was born in Chebaa. He studied dentistry at Damascus University. He is the head of the West Bekaa-Centre branch of the Baath Party. He was elected to parliament in 2000, 2005 and 2009, 2018 and 2022 as part of the Development and Liberation bloc.
