= 1971 Chouf parliamentary by-election =

Election in Lebanon

On January 10, 1971, a by-poll was held to elect a member of parliament from one of the Sunni Muslim seats from Chouf District in the Lebanese Chamber of Deputies. The constituency was a very sensitive area, as it was the home to arch-rivals Kamal Jumblatt and Camille Chamoun. The election was described by contemporary observers as the 'most fiery Lebanon had ever witnessed in a by-election'. There was a massive presence of security forces deployed in the constituency during the campaign and on the voting day in particular.

The election was called following the death of the incumbent Progressive Socialist Party parliamentarian Anwar al-Khatib in November 1970. Al-Khatib had been elected from Chouf in 1968.

Throughout the campaign there were unsuccessful efforts to find a compromise candidate, in order to avoid further sectarian conflict. The Prime Minister Saeb Salam was the most prominent figure in this drive for a middle ground. Salam also met with the Fatah leader Muhammad Yusuf an-Najjar to discuss reports of involvement of Palestinian fedayeen in the election campaign, claims that an-Najjar rebutted.

In the end the fight over the seat stood between two candidates; Zahir al-Khatib (son of Anwar al-Khatib) and Hassan al-Qa'qur. Al-Khatib of the Progressive Socialist Party belonged to the camp Kamal Jumblatt. His candidature was also supported by Nahj, the Communist Party and other leftists. Al-Qa'qur, who had been defeated by the late al-Khatib in the 1968 election, was supported by an alliance consisting of ex-president Camille Chamoun's National Liberal Party, the Kataeb Party, Constitutionalists, former Nahjists and others.

Al-Khatib won the seat, obtaining 22,065 votes. Al-Qa'qur obtained 18,148 votes. The election reaffirmed Jumblatt's dominance over politics in the Chouf District. In the end, no violent incidents were reported.
