= Toilers League =

Toilers League رابطة الشغيلة
- Abbreviation: WL
- Leader: Mohamad el-Khateeb
- Founder: Hadi Al Harakeh (Nom de Guerre: “Abou Ali Itani”)
- Founded: Late 1960s
- Headquarters: Chouf
- Ideology: Marxism-Leninism; Socialism; Pan-Arabism; Arab nationalism
- Political position: Left-wing to far-left

Party flag

The Toilers League (Arabic: رابطة الشغيلة, romanized: Rabitat al-Shaghila), also designated the Workers League is a Lebanese Marxist-Leninist political party founded in Lebanon at the late 1960s and currently led by Mohamad el-Khatib.

== Origins ==
The Toilers League originated from a previous socialist students association formed at the American University of Beirut (AUB) in 1968 by the then student activist and Progressive Socialist Party (PSP) militant Hadi Al Harakeh. In 1974 the group broke away from the PSP and re-emerged as a separated political party under Zaher El-Khatib's leadership, who had previously succeeded to be elected to the Lebanese Parliament as the socialist deputy for the Iqlim al-Kharrub district of the Chouf in the 1971 Chouf parliamentary by-election, after the death of their father Anwar el-Khatib (the incumbent Sunni MP representing the Chouf) in 1970.

== Political beliefs ==
Marxist–Leninist and Pan-Arab nationalist in ideology, the League joined Kamal Jumblatt's Lebanese National Movement (LNM) in early 1975, even raising a militia named the Zafer el-Khatib Forces – ZKF (Arabic: قوات ظافر الخطيب | Al-Quwwat Zafer el-Khatib), also known as Les Forces de Zafer el-Khatib (FZK) in French. After the collapse of the LNM alliance in 1982, the WL/ZKF switched their allegiance to Syria and established a close relationship with the Shia Amal Movement.

== The Toilers League in the Lebanese Civil War 1975–1990 ==
Zafer el-Khatib Forces – ZKF قوات ظافر الخطيب
- Leader: Zafer el-Khatib
- Dates active: 1975 – 1991
- Headquarters: West Beirut
- Active regions: West Beirut
- Size: 200-500 fighters
- Part of: Lebanese National Movement
- Wars: Lebanese Civil War

During the early phase of the Lebanese Civil War the ZKF's strength peaked at about 200-500 male and female fighters, mostly Sunnis, who fought in the ranks of the LNM/Joint Forces. Equipped with infantry small-arms pilfered from Lebanese Army (LAF) barracks and Internal Security Forces (ISF) Police stations or supplied by the PLO, along with a few technicals armed with Heavy machine-guns and Recoilless rifles, the League/ZKF operated mainly in central West Beirut, but heavy casualties and desertions led to the decline of their military role afterwards. By the late 1980s the League had lost what was left of its political support base, whilst its dwindling ZKF militia was reduced to a neighbourhood defense group confined to their Headquarters at Rue Hamra – located on the namesake district – and adjacent Ras Beirut sector, where they ran a joint television service, "The Orient" (Arabic: Al-Machriq), with the Amal Movement until 1990.

== The post-war years ==
Upon the end of the war in October 1990, the ZKF militia forces operating in the Capital were ordered by the Lebanese Government on March 28, 1991, to disband and surrender their heavy weaponry by April 30 as stipulated by the Taif Agreement. Although the ZKF militia was disbanded, the Toilers League remained politically active, even managing to pull some seats in the elections for the Lebanese Parliament on several occasions – from 2000 to 2005 their member of Parliament (MP) Nasser Kandil represented Beirut's 3rd electoral district. The Party is currently a member of the pro-Syrian March 8 Alliance.

== See also ==
- Amal Movement
- Mountain War (Lebanon)
- Organization of Communist Action in Lebanon
- Progressive Socialist Party
- People's Liberation Army (Lebanon)
- Popular Guard
- Lebanese Arab Army
- Lebanese Civil War
- Lebanese Communist Party
- Lebanese National Movement
- List of weapons of the Lebanese Civil War
