= Shheem =

Settlement in Lebanon

Shhiim (Chehim)
- شحيم (Arabic)
- Location within Lebanon
- 33.6244°N 35.4850°E
- Type: City, town
- Cultures: Roman
- Associated with: Hamdan, Hajjar, Abdallah, Khatib, Chaaban, Fawaz, Dahrouj, Hajj-Chehade, Charafeddine, Younes, Mrad, Daher, Oueidat, Moallem, Saab, El-Halabi, Trawi, Dghayle
- Location: Lebanon
- Region: Mount Lebanon Governorate, Chouf District
- Part of: Iqlim El-Kharrub

Site notes
- Height: 500–900 metres
- Area: 8.54 km^{2} (3.30 sq mi)
- Condition: Developing Town

Shhiim, or Šaḥīm (Arabic: شحيم) (IPA: ʃħiːm) alternatively written as Shheem or Chhim/Chehim is a town in Lebanon which is located 40 kilometres south-east of Beirut.

The largest Sunni Muslim town in the Chouf region, Shhiim has a population of approximately 50,560. Situated on four mountains, the town is often regarded as the capital of the Iqlim el-Kharrub, which is the coastal part of the Chouf.

The town is notable for a very well-preserved archaeological site located there, including a Roman sanctuary, a Christian basilica, residential structures, and oil presses.

== Geography ==
Chhim is often confused within size due to many parts of it having different names; some more familiar parts of Chhim include Marj-Ali, Sahle, Jabal Swed, Chamis and Jirid.

The town has historically faced troubles with earthquakes as it sits on top of the Roum Fault Line which is a part of the bigger Yammounneh Fault Line.

In 1956, Chhim witnessed a devastating earthquake that destroyed six thousand homes and killed 136 people.

== Politics and services ==
Politics in the area is dominated by the Future Movement and the Progressive Socialist Party, with two MPs from Shhiim taking on a role for each respective party.

Shhiim contains 11 schools, 8 of which are public. It also has two hospitals, one public and one private.

Shhiim is Also the Birthplace of Ahmad Al Khatib, The founder of the Lebanese Arab Army

It is also the Birthplace of Zaher Al Khatib, the Leader of the Toilers League.

== History ==
Shhiim contains mosques and is mostly inhabited by Sunni Muslims. It is the site of one of many Roman Temples.

In the era of prosperity in the 2nd century AD, the villagers of Chhim decided to erect a Roman temple on the southern end of the settlement. A small edifice built in the Corinthian style probably matched their rising ambitions. We do not know what deity was worshiped there, but its long-standing cult ended with the arrival of Christianity. The temple was abandoned, and a church was built opposite it at the end of the 5th century.

The name of the town Chhim derives from its historical and centuries-old name of ‘Chahem’, which means ‘blacken’ in Aramaic times.

== Weather ==
Shhiim has warm, dry and humid summers, with cold and wet winters.

== Archaeological site ==
The archaeological site lies on a slope of a hill on the outskirts of the city. It is a Roman-Byzantine village, with a Roman temple towering above the rest of the ancient architecture. The temple faces east and has a small porch. There is a carving of the sun god Helios on one of the doorframes. Another carving portrays the image of a priest with outstretched arms.

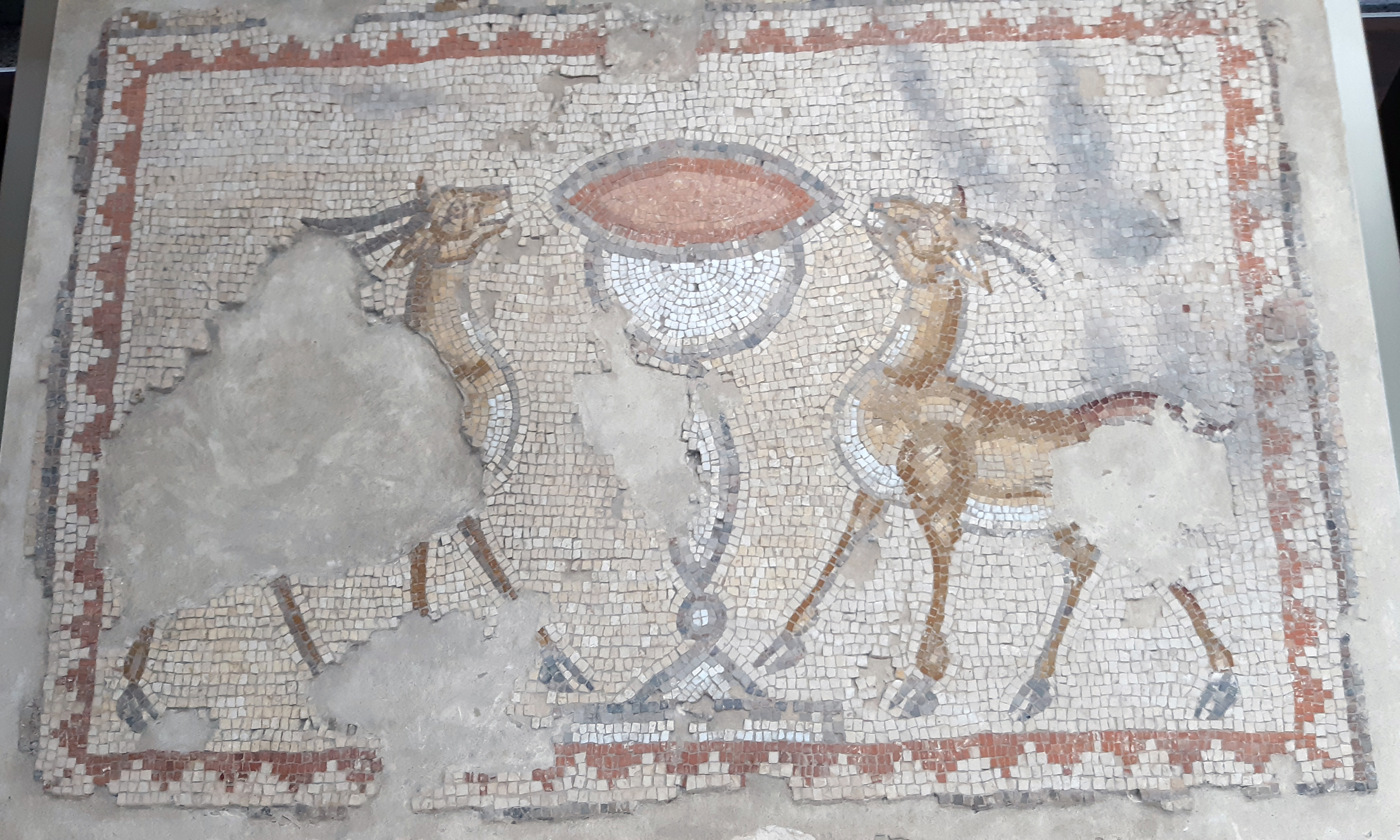
Mosaic from the Christian basilica in Chhim, on display at the Beirut Airport

Haroutune Kalayan reconstructed the temple in the 1970s, and in the 1990s, Renata Ortali Tarazi from the Directorate General of Antiquities of Lebanon (DGA) undertook the task of site preservation. She started a three-way cooperation with the Institut français du Proche-Orient (IFPO), represented by Lévon Nordiguian, and the Polish Centre of Mediterranean Archaeology, University of Warsaw (PCMA UW).

The settlement was founded at the turn of the eras, although the oldest finds date to the Bronze Age. Parts of the village are remarkably well-preserved. Apart from the Roman temple, archaeologists discovered houses clustered along narrow streets, oil presses, and a Christian basilica with mosaics, dated to AD 498. A necropolis surrounded the settlement. The village ceased to function in the late 7th century or early 8th century AD. The final occupation phase shows reduced material remains. There is no evidence for violent destruction.

Multicolored mosaics covering the whole floor of the basilica are among the most spectacular discoveries made on the site. Most of them depict geometrical patterns, but floral and figural motifs also occur; birds and vessels appear on the surfaces between columns. In the central part of the presbytery, there is a mosaic with a lioness, and in the west aisle, a panel with two antelopes. The iconography of these mosaics bears many similarities to other Byzantine churches in the province of Phoenicia, e.g., in Zahrani and Ghiné.

== Demographics ==
In 2014, Muslims made up 99.22% of registered voters in Shheem. 97.01% of the voters were Sunni Muslims.
