= Barja =

Barja برجا Barja el-Chouf
- Town
- Location within Lebanon
- Coordinates: 33°38′59″N 35°26′36″E
- Country: Lebanon
- Governorate: Mount Lebanon
- District: Chouf

Area
  - Total: 7.29 km^{2} (2.81 sq mi)
- Elevation: 310 m (1,020 ft)

Population (2010)
  - Total: 12,888
  - Density: 1,770/km^{2} (4,580/sq mi)
- (Registered voters)
- Time zone: UTC+2 (EET)
  - Summer (DST): UTC+3 (EEST)
- Dialing code: +961 7 (623) (920) (921)
- Website: www.barjaonline.com

Barja (Arabic: برجا, also known as Barja al-Chouf) is a town and municipality in the Chouf District of the Mount Lebanon Governorate in Lebanon. Barja is situated near the Mediterranean coast, 34 kilometers south of Beirut and at the midway point between the latter and Sidon. The town's total land area consists of 729 hectares, and its highest point above sea level is documented at 310 meters. Barja had 12,888 registered voters in 2010, and eleven schools with a total of 2,788 students in 2006. Its inhabitants are predominantly Sunni Muslims.

== History ==
=== Caves and monuments ===
Close to the northern entrance of the Barja, a few dozen caves and burial cemeteries can be seen carved out inside of rock hills, which date back to the Neolithic period. The urban expansion has destroyed a lot of it but some paintings and engravings and remains of a population that lived in this region can still be found from time to time, such as Mesopotamia, Persians, Greece, Romans and Byzantines. When the French Renan mission visited Lebanon in 1863, it described Barja as the “buried city - Necropole”. Residents of Barja has also seen this expedition taking back to the French consulate in Beirut a monument bearing a Greek inscription. “Khorstos Al-Sharif Salam, he left prematurely, lived 27 years, died in 228.

In the modern age, that area is called by “Qasr bu Hanin", attributed to the name of the landowner. The castle of Al-Nawawais, next to a college building, which overlooks the valley of a town named "Siblin", is wrongfully called “Ajran El-Dibs”, but in fact, it is Nawawais, which means sarcophaguses, originally made for Phoenician priests and other of pagan peoples.

=== Ottoman era ===
In 1838, Eli Smith noted it as Burja, a village located in "Aklim el Kharnub, North of et-Tuffah, next the coast".

=== Twentieth century ===
During the Lebanese Civil War (1975-1990), hundreds of young men and women emigrated from Barja to various countries such as Australia, Brazil, the United States, Canada, and the United Kingdom, contributing to the Lebanese diaspora.

=== Contemporary period ===
The town has houses that demonstrate traditional architecture. Since the turn of the millennium, Barja has experienced westernization. As public transportation and mass transit become more abundant, locals are commuting to the capital city Beirut in search for job opportunities.

== Climate ==
Barja has mild Mediterranean climate during summer and winter seasons, as average temperatures vary between 11 - 27 °C.

Much of the town was destroyed during a devastating earthquake that shook the Chouf District in 1956. However, over the past 50 years the remains of the earthquake have been gradually concealed beneath a layer of building development.

== Demographics ==
In 2014, Muslims made up 97.95% and Christians made up 1.75% of registered voters in Barja. 95.72% of the voters were Sunni Muslims. The Christian population is mostly Maronite Catholics.

== Notable people ==
- Khalil Bader (born 1999), footballer

== Bibliography ==
- Robinson, E.; Smith, E. (1841). Biblical Researches in Palestine, Mount Sinai and Arabia Petraea: A Journal of Travels in the year 1838. Vol. 3. Boston: Crocker & Brewster.
