= Arab Socialist Ba'ath Party – Lebanon Region =

National Banner Party حزب الراية الوطني
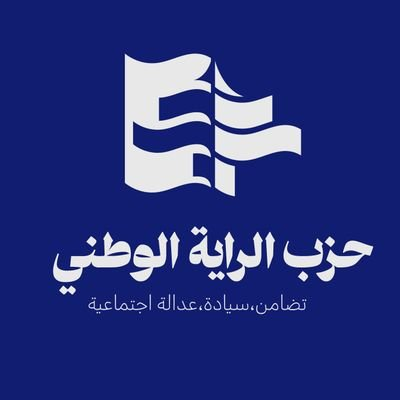
- Leader: Ali Hijazi
- Founded: 1953; 73 years ago
- Headquarters: Beirut
- Ideology: Arab nationalism; Formerly: Neo-Ba'athism
- National affiliation: March 8 Alliance
- International affiliation: Ba'ath Party (Syrian-dominated faction) (until 2025)
- Colors: Blue
- Parliamentary bloc: Development and Liberation
- Parliament of Lebanon: 1 / 128
- Cabinet of Lebanon: 0 / 24

Website
- https://alrayahalwatani.org/

Party logo until 2025

The National Banner Party (Arabic: حزب الراية الوطني), formerly known as the Arab Socialist Ba'ath Party in Lebanon (Arabic: حزب البعث العربي الاشتراكي في لبنان Ḥizb al-Ba‘th al-‘Arabī al-Ishtirākī fī Lubnān) or the Lebanon Regional Branch, is a political party in Lebanon. It was the regional branch of the Ba'ath Party (Syrian-dominated faction). The leadership has been disputed since 2015; however, Fayez Shukr was the party leader from 2006 to 2015, when he succeeded Sayf al-Din Ghazi, who succeeded Assem Qanso.

== History ==
The Lebanese branch of the undivided Ba'ath Party was formed in 1949–1950. Assem Qanso is the longest-serving secretary (leader) of the Lebanese Ba'ath Party, first from 1971 to 1989 and again from 2000 to 2005. In 1953 it merged with Arab Socialist Party headed by Akram Hourani, and the current title was adopted. One of its secretaries general was Abdallah Al Amin, headquartered in Beirut.

=== Lebanese Civil War ===
The Assad Battalion كتيبة الاسد
- Leader: Muhammad Saeed Akkam (Abu Fahd)
- Dates active: 1975-1991
- Headquarters: West Beirut
- Active regions: Lebanon
- Size: 2,000 fighters
- Part of: Lebanese National Movement; Lebanese National Resistance Front; Unification and Liberation Front
- Wars: Lebanese Civil War

During the start of the Lebanese Civil War in 1975, the party had an armed militia, the Assad Battalion, of some 2,000 armed men. The party joined forces with Kamal Jumblatt's Progressive Socialist Party in organizing the Lebanese National Movement, seeking to abolish the confessional state. The Lebanese National Movement was later superseded by the Lebanese National Resistance Front, in which the party participated. The party organized resistance against Israeli forces in Lebanon. In July 1987, it took part in forming yet another front, the Unification and Liberation Front.

=== Post-war ===
In the 2009 parliamentary election, the party won two seats as part of the March 8 Alliance. The parliamentarians of the party were Assem Qanso and Qassem Hashem.

The Lebanese Ba'ath Party is also militarily involved in the Syrian Civil War and has sent forces under its control to aid Bashar al-Assad's government against the Syrian opposition. One contingent, allegedly 400 fighters strong, took part in the Daraa offensive (June 2017). Its commander, Hussein Ali Rabiha from Nabatieh, was killed during this operation.

Before the 2018 Lebanese general election, the Lebanese Ba'ath Party had suffered a split, with Regional Secretary Assem Qanso and Numan Shalq heading in different directions. Both factions had nominated candidates for the elections, but none was accepted into a list and were thus eliminated from the polls. Reportedly, the Syrian ambassador, Ali Abdul Karim, had lobbied against any list accepting Qanso's candidates, as his group is not recognized from Damascus. A Baathist politician, Kassem Hachem, was included in a list in South III as Amal candidate, but not on behalf of the party. Former Regional Secretary Fayez Shukr headed a list in Bekaa III. On 7 April 2019, the Lebanese Ba'ath Party and other parties staged pro-Syrian demonstrations in Beirut; this was the "first such show of its kind" since 2005.

During the 2024 Israeli invasion of Lebanon, an Israeli airstrike was launched on the Lebanese Ba'ath Party headquarters in Ras el-Nabaa in Beirut which killed a Hezbollah spokesman, Mohammed Afif. Following the fall of the Assad regime, the party's headquarters in Halba were stormed by a mob of anti-Assad militants.

On 12 December 2025, the head of the party, Ali Hijazi, announced that the party had changed its name to the "National Banner Party", and said that he would submit an official request to the Lebanese government to formally change the party's name.

However, some people, including Assem Qanso, refused to change the party name and split into a separate party called the Arab Socialist Ba'ath Party – Lebanon Region.

== Party leaders ==
- Mahmoud Baydoun (1966–1969)
- Magali Nasrawin (1969–1971)
- Assem Qanso (1971–1989)
- Abdallah Al Amin (1989–1993)
- Abdallah Chahal (1993–1996)
- Sayf al-Din Ghazi (1996–2000)
- Assem Qanso (2000–2005)
- Sayf al-Din Ghazi (2005–2006)
- Fayez Shukr (2006–2015)
- Abdul Mou'in Ghazi (2015–2016)
- Suheil Qassar (2016)
- Nu'man Shalaq (2016–2021)
- Ali Hijazi (2021–present)

== Legislative elections ==
Parliament of Lebanon
Election year	# of overall votes	% of overall vote	# of overall seats won	+/–	Leader
1992	???? (#6)	???	2 / 128	▲2	Abdallah Al Amin
1996	???? (#5)	???	2 / 128	2	Abdallah Chahal
2000	???? (#5)	???	3 / 128	▲1	Sayf al-Din Ghazi
2005	???? (#7)	???	1 / 128	▼2	Assem Qanso
2009	???? (#7)	???	2 / 128	▲1	Fayez Shukr
2018	88,268	4.72	1 / 128	▼1	Disputed
2022	10,215	???	1 / 128	1	Ali Hijazi

== See also ==
- Socialist Arab Lebanon Vanguard Party
- Lebanese Civil War
- Lebanese National Movement
- Mountain War (Lebanon)
