= Amal Movement =

Lebanese political party

Amal Movement حركة أمل
- Abbreviation: Amal, أمل
- Chairman: Nabih Berri
- Founders: Musa al-Sadr; Hussein el-Husseini; Mostafa Chamran; Grégoire Haddad; Ragheb Harb
- Founded: 6 July 1974; 52 years ago
- Headquarters: Beirut
- Military wing: Lebanese Resistance Regiments; (1975–1991); Al-Abbas Force; (2006–present)
- Ideology: Lebanese nationalism; Secularism; Historically: Islamism
- Political position: Centre-right
- Religion: Shia Islam; Factions: Christianity
- National affiliation: March 8 Alliance
- International affiliation: Axis of Resistance
- Colours: Green, Red
- Slogan: "To struggle against oppression" (tagline)
- Parliamentary bloc: Development and Liberation
- Parliament of Lebanon: 15 / 128
- Cabinet of Lebanon: 2 / 24

Party flag

The Amal Movement (Arabic: حركة أمل, romanized: Ḥarakat Amal, lit. 'Hope Movement') is a Lebanese political party and militia affiliated mainly with the Shia community of Lebanon. It was founded by Musa al-Sadr and Hussein el-Husseini in 1974 as the "Movement of the Deprived". The party has been led by Nabih Berri since 1980.

The Amal Movement gained attention from Shia outcry after the disappearance of Musa al-Sadr and saw a renewal in popularity after the 1978 South Lebanon conflict with Israel. The Iranian Revolution of 1979 also provided momentum for the party. The Amal Movement is the largest predominantly Shia party in parliament, having fourteen representatives to Hezbollah's thirteen. Amal has an alliance with Hezbollah.

== Name ==
The movement's current name was originally used by the Deprived Movement's militia, the "Lebanese Resistance Regiments" (Arabic: أفواج المقاومة اللبنانية). This name, when abbreviated, created the acronym "Amal", which is Arabic for "hope".

== Origins ==
=== Harakat al-Mahrumin / Movement of the Deprived ===
Harakat al-Mahrumin (Arabic: حركة المحرومين meaning The Movement of the Deprived or The Movement of the Dispossessed or The Movement of the Disinherited) was established by Imam Musa al-Sadr and member of parliament Hussein el-Husseini in 1974, as an attempt to reform the Lebanese system, although the beginnings can be traced to 1969 in declarations by the Imam al-Sadr calling upon peace and equality among all Lebanese confessions and religions, so that no one confession would remain "deprived" in any region in Lebanon, noting that the Shia community in Lebanon remained the poorest and most neglected by the Lebanese government.

While acknowledging its support base to be the "traditionally under-represented politically and economically disadvantaged" Shi'a community, it aimed, according to Palmer-Harik, to seek social justice for all deprived Lebanese. Although influenced by Islamic ideas, it was a secular movement trying to unite people along communal rather than religious or ideological lines.

The movement had support from many confessions, but membership remained mainly within the Shia confession and was considered as a definitive Shia force against the traditional Shia families hegemony at the time.

The Greek Catholic Archbishop of Beirut, Grégoire Haddad, was among the founders of the movement.

The movement was absorbed in 1975 into what is now called the Amal Movement.

=== Lebanese Resistance Regiments ===
On January 20, 1975, the 'Lebanese Resistance Regiments' (Arabic: أفواج المقاومة اللبنانية | Afwaj al-Muqawama al-Lubnaniyya), also designated variously as the 'Lebanese Resistance Battalions', 'The Battalions of the Lebanese Resistance', 'Lebanese Resistance Detachments' and 'Battalions de la Resistance Libanaise (BRL)' in French were formed as the military wing of Harakat al-Mahrumin under the leadership of al-Sadr, and came to be popularly known as Amal (in Arabic أمل) from the acronym Afwaj al-Mouqawma Al-Lubnaniyya.

== Ideology ==
The Amal Movement's ideology and beliefs has mainly been described as Lebanese nationalist and secular with some other beliefs including being moderate, populist, economically liberal, anti-Zionist, conservative, and militarist. It has formerly been Islamist.

In terms of political position, Amal can be described as centre-right.

== Amal Movement ==
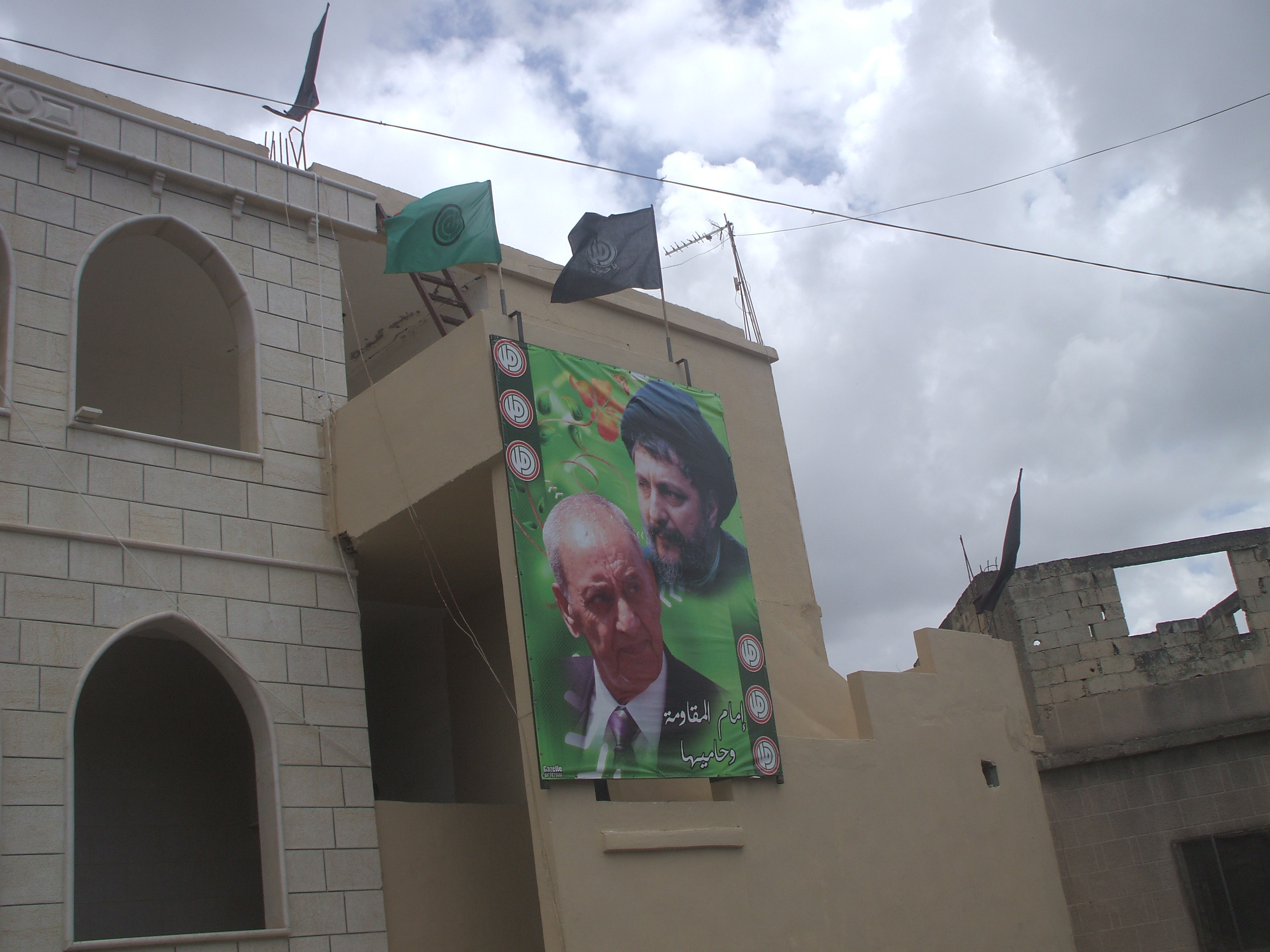
A poster of Amal Movement's two main figures, Nabih Berri and Musa al-Sadr

Amal became one of the most important Shi'a Muslim militias during the Lebanese Civil War. It grew strong with the support of, and through its ties with, Syria and the 300,000 Shi'a internal refugees from southern Lebanon after the Israeli bombings in the early 1980s. Amal's practical objectives were to gain greater respect for Lebanon's Shi'ite population and the allocation of a larger share of governmental resources for the Shi'ite-dominated southern part of the country.

At its zenith, the militia had 14,000 troops. Amal fought a long campaign against Palestinian refugees during the Lebanese Civil War, called the War of the Camps. After the War of the Camps, Amal fought a bloody battle against rival Shi'a group Hezbollah for control of Beirut, which provoked Syrian military intervention. Hezbollah itself was formed by religious members of Amal who had left after Nabih Berri's assumption of full control and the subsequent resignation of most of Amal's earliest members.

=== Timeline ===
On January 20, 1975 T5, the Lebanese Resistance Detachments, also called 'The Battalions of the Lebanese Resistance' in English, is formed as a military wing of The Movement of the Disinherited under the leadership of al-Sadr. In 1978 the founder Al-Sadr disappears in mysterious circumstances while visiting Libya. He was succeeded by Hussein el-Husseini as leader of Amal.

In 1980, Palestinian guerrillas attempt to assassinate then-Secretary General Hussein el-Husseini by launching missiles into his home, outside Beirut. El-Husseini had refused, despite Syrian pressure, to get involved in the Lebanese Civil War and fight alongside the PLO or any other faction.

Subsequently, in 1980, el-Husseini resigned from the leadership of Amal and was replaced by Nabih Berri, marking the entry of Amal in the Lebanese Civil War.

In the summer of 1982 Husayn Al-Musawi, deputy head and official spokesman of Amal, broke away to form the Islamist Islamic Amal Movement.

In May 1985, heavy fighting erupted between Amal and Palestinian camp militias for the control of the Sabra, Shatila and Burj el-Barajneh camps in Beirut, sparking the so-called "War of the Camps" which lasted until 1987.

In December 1985, Nabih Berri of Amal, Walid Jumblatt of the Druze Progressive Socialist Party (PSP), and Elie Hobeika of the Lebanese Forces signed the Tripartite Accord in Damascus which is supposed to give strong influence to Damascus regarding Lebanese matters. The agreement never came into effect due to Hobeika's ousting.

Two months later Amal militiamen were driven out of West Beirut by their Communist (PLA) and Druze (PSP) rivals in a week of street fighting, artillery exchanges and looting which led to the Syrian army returning to Beirut on 22 February after an absence of three and a half years.

On February 17, 1988, the American Chief of the United Nations Truce Supervision Organization (UNTSO) observer group in Lebanon, Lt. Col. William R. Higgins, was abducted and later killed after meeting with Amal's political leader of southern Lebanon. Amal responded by launching a campaign against Hezbollah in the south, It was believed that Hezbollah abducted him. Hezbollah to this day denies it and insists that it was done to create problems between them and the Amal movement.

In April 1988 Amal launched an all-out assault on Hezbollah positions in south Lebanon and the southern suburbs of Beirut. Early in May 1988 Hezbollah gained control of 80% of the Shi'ite suburbs of Beirut through well-timed assaults.

In 1989, Amal accepted the Taif agreement (mainly authored by el-Husseini) in order to end the civil war.

In September 1991, with background in the Syrian controlled end of the Lebanese Civil War in October 1990, 2,800 Amal troops joined the Lebanese army.

== Lebanese Civil War ==
=== War of the Camps ===
The War of the Camps was a series of controversial battles in the mid-1980s between Amal and Palestinian groups. The Druze-oriented Progressive Socialist Party (PSP), the leftists, and also Hezbollah supported the Palestinians, while the Syrian government backed Amal.

==== First battle (May 1985) ====
Although most of the Palestinian guerrillas were expelled during the 1982 Israeli invasion, Palestinian militias began to regain their footing after the Israeli withdrawal from first Beirut, then Sidon and Tyre. Syria viewed this revival with some anxiety: though in the same ideological camp, Damascus had little control over most Palestinians organizations and was afraid that the build-up of Palestinian forces could lead to a new Israeli invasion. In Lebanon, Shia–Palestinian relations had been very tense since the late 1960s.

After the multinational force withdrew from Beirut in February 1984, Amal and the PSP took control of west Beirut and Amal built a number of outposts around the camps, in Beirut and the south. On April 15, 1985, Amal and the PSP attacked Al-Murabitun, the main Lebanese Sunni militia and the closest ally of the PLO in Lebanon. Al-Murabitun were vanquished and their leader, Ibrahim Kulaylat was sent into exile. On May 19, 1985, heavy fighting erupted between Amal and the Palestinians for the control of the Sabra, Shatila and Burj el-Barajneh camps, all in Beirut.

On May 28, 1985, Amal suffered a suicide attack by four young female Palestinian suicide bombers in Shatila. Despite its efforts, Amal could not take the control of the camps. The death toll remains unknown, with estimates ranging from a few hundreds to a few thousands. This and heavy Arab pressure led to a cease-fire on June 17.

==== Second battle (May 1986) ====
The situation remained tense and fights occurred again in September 1985 and March 1986. On May 19, 1986, heavy fighting erupted again. Despite new armaments provided by Syria, Amal could not take control of the camps. Many cease-fires were announced, but most of them did not last more than a few days. The situation began to cool after Syria deployed some troops on June 24, 1986.

==== Third battle (September 1986) ====
There was tension in the south, an area where Shi'as and Palestinians were both present. This led to frequent clashes. On September 29, 1986, fighting erupted at the Rashidiyye camp (Tyre). The conflict immediately spread to Sidon and Beirut. Palestinian forces managed to occupy the Amal-controlled town of Maghdouché on the eastern hills of Sidon to open the road to Rashidiyye. Syrian forces helped Amal and Israel launched air strikes against PLO position around Maghdouche.

A cease-fire was negotiated between Amal and pro-Syrian Palestinian groups on December 15, 1986, but it was rejected by Yasser Arafat's Fatah. Fatah tried to appease the situation by giving some of its positions to Hezbollah and to the Murabitun. The situation became relatively calm for a while, but the bombing against the camps continued. In Beirut, a blockade of the camps led to a dramatic lack of food and medications inside the camps.

In early 1987, the fighting spread to Hezbollah and the PSP who supported the Palestinians. The PSP, having won numerous battles, quickly seized large portions of west Beirut. Consequently, Syria occupied west Beirut beginning February 21, 1987. On April 7, 1987, Amal finally lifted the siege and handed its positions around the camps to the Syrian army. According to The New York Times (March 10, 1992, citing figures from the Lebanese police), 3,781 were killed in the fighting.

=== War of Brothers ===
On February 17, 1988, Col William R. Higgins, American Chief of the United Nations Truce Supervision Organization (UNTSO) observer group in Lebanon, was abducted from his UN vehicle between Tyre and Nakoura after a meeting with Abd al-Majid Saleh, Amal's political leader in southern Lebanon. It soon became "clear that Sheikh al-Musawi, the commander to Hezbollah's Islamic Resistance, had been personally responsible for the abduction of Lt. Col Higgins in close cooperation with both Sheikh Abdul Karim Obeid, the local commander of Hizballah's military wing, and Mustafa al-Dirani, the former head of Amal's security service."

This was seen as a direct challenge to Amal by Hezbollah, and Amal responded by launching an offensive against Hezbollah in the south where it "scores decisive military victories ... leading to the expulsion of a number of Hizballah clergy to the Beqqa". In Beirut's southern suburbs however, where fighting also raged, Hizballah was much more successful. "[E]lements within Hizballah and the Iranian Pasdaran established a joint command to assassinate high-ranking Amal officials and carry out operations against Amal checkpoints and centers."

By May, Amal had suffered major losses, its members were defecting to Hezbollah, and by June, Syria had to intervene militarily to rescue Amal from defeat. In January 1989, a truce in the "ferocious" fighting between Hizballah and Amal was arranged by Syrian and Iranian intervention. "Under this agreement, Amal's authority over the security of southern Lebanon [is] recognized while Hizballah [is] permitted to maintain only a nonmilitary presence through political, cultural, and informational programmes."

== Amal after the war ==
Amal was a strong supporter of Syria after 1990 and endorsed Syria's military presence in Lebanon. After Rafik Hariri's assassination in 2005, Amal opposed the Syrian withdrawal and did not take part in the Cedar Revolution.

Since 1992, the party has been represented in the Lebanese parliament and the government. Amal's enemies often criticize it for corruption among its semi-major leaders. Nabih Berri was elected speaker of parliament in 1992, 1996, 2000, 2005, 2009 and 2016. Following the 2018 Lebanese general election, Amal has had 17 representatives in the 128-seat Lebanese parliament. This was an increase from the 13 representatives at the 2009 election, 14 at the 2005 election, 10 at the 2000 election, 8 at the 1996 election and 5 at the 1992 election.

According to Amal officials, the party's militants "have been involved in every major battle since fighting began" during the 2006 Lebanon War, and at least 8 members were reported to have been killed.

Amal's military wing began participating in the 2023 Israel–Lebanon border clashes in November by launching strikes on Israeli military barracks; one of its members was later killed by Israeli shelling of the town of Rab Thalathine. Another fighter was killed in August by an Israeli strike on a car in the town of Khiam. Two fighters from the Al-Abbas Force (elite unit of the Amal Movement), were killed in battles against Israeli forces invading Lebanon in October 2024.

In February 2025, Lebanese Prime Minister Nawaf Salam announced his government, which consists of 24 ministers; the Amal movement controls three portfolios: the Finance Ministry, headed by Yassine Jaber; the Environment Ministry, headed by Tamara Al-Zein; and the Ministry of Administrative Development, under Fadi Maki. The last was appointed by the Prime Minister but is close to Amal.

== General election summary ==
Election year	# of overall votes	% of overall vote	# of overall seats won (Note: Table also includes MPs of Berri's bloc/alliance and are not directly affiliated with the party.)	+/–	Leader
1992			17 / 128	▲17	Nabih Berri
1996		6.25%	21 / 128	▲4	Nabih Berri
2000		7.81%	16 / 128	▼5	Nabih Berri
2005		10.93%	14 / 128	▼2	Nabih Berri
2009			13 / 128	▼1	Nabih Berri
2018	204,199 (#3)	11.04%	17 / 128	▲4	Nabih Berri
2022	190,161 (#3)	10.52%	15 / 128	▼2	Nabih Berri

== See also ==
- Lebanese Civil War
- Lebanese Forces
- South Lebanon Army
- People's Liberation Army (Lebanon)
- War of the Camps
- Weapons of the Lebanese Civil War
