= 1992 Lebanese general election =

- 23 August–11 October 1992

All 128 seats in the Parliament of Lebanon
- Turnout: 30.35% (▼24.03pp)
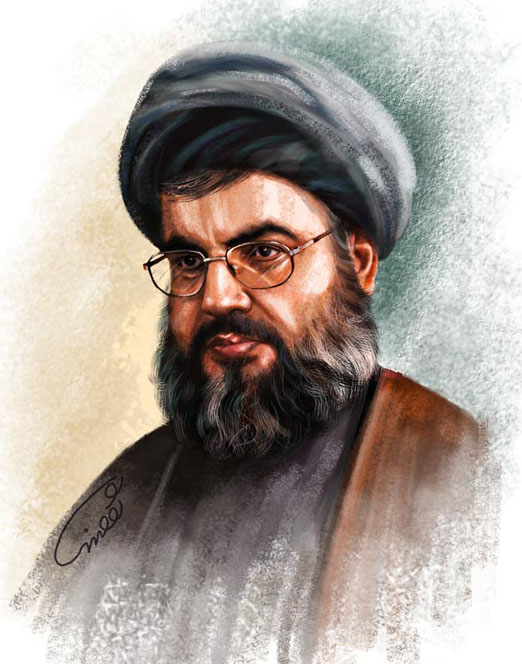

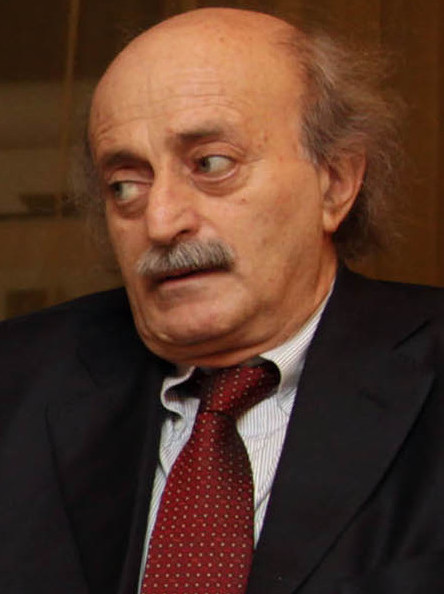

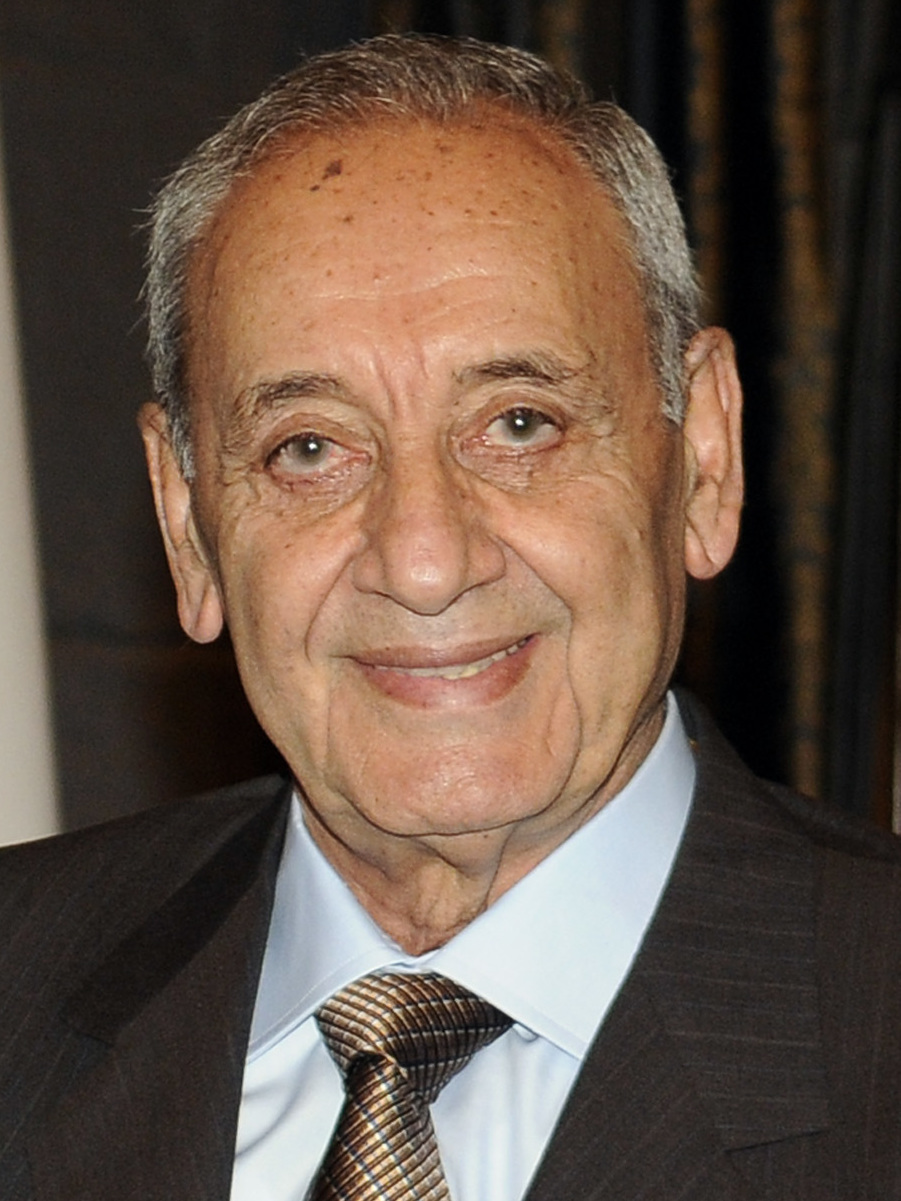
	First party	Second party	Third party
		SSN
Leader	Hassan Nasrallah		Walid Jumblatt
Party	Hezbollah	SSNP	PSP
Seats before	New	0	5
Seats won	8	6	5
Seat change	New	▲6	Steady
	Fourth party	Fifth party	Sixth party
		JAI	ASB
Leader	Nabih Berri		Abdallah Al Amin
Party	Amal	Islamic Group	Ba'ath Party
Seats before	New	New	1
Seats won	5	3	2
Seat change	New	New	▲1
Prime Minister before election
Rachid Solh
Independent
Elected Prime Minister
Rafic Hariri
Independent

General elections were held in Lebanon between 23 August and 11 October 1992, the first since 1972. Independent candidates won the majority of seats, although most of them were considered members of various blocs. Voter turnout was 30%.

== Results ==
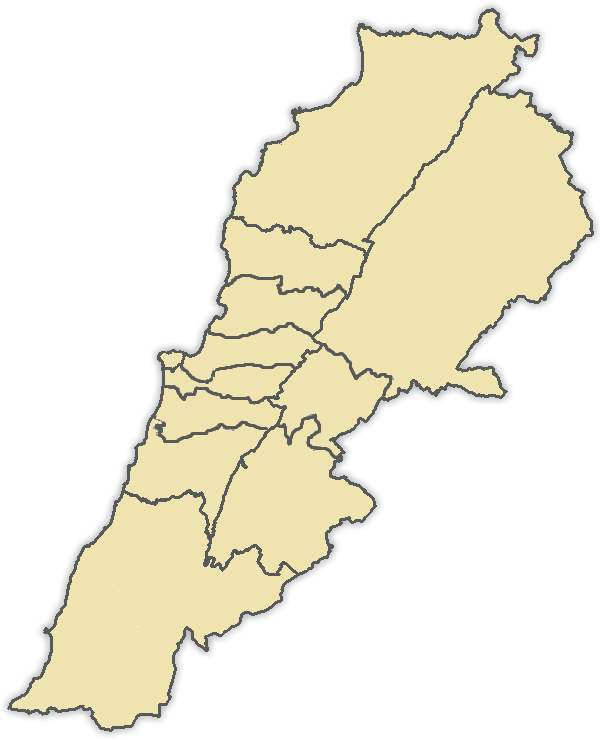
Electoral districts per the 1992 Vote Law

Party	Votes	%	Seats	+/–
Hezbollah			8	New
Syrian Social Nationalist Party			6	+6
Progressive Socialist Party			5	0
Amal Movement			5	New
Islamic Group			3	New
Arab Socialist Ba'ath Party			2	+1
Arab Democratic Party			1	New
Al-Ahbash			1	New
Toilers League			1	New
Popular Nasserist Organization			1	New
Promise Party			1	New
Armenian Revolutionary Federation			1	0
Social Democrat Hunchakian Party			1	+1
Armenian Democratic Liberal Party			0	0
Independents			92	+29
Total			128	+29
Total votes	723,291	–		
Registered voters/turnout	2,383,345	30.35		
Source: Nohlen et al.

Of the 92 independent MPs, 68 were considered to be members of various blocs:

- 12 in the Berri bloc (plus the five Amal Movement MPs)
- 11 in the Hrawi bloc
- 10 in the Salim el-Hoss bloc
- 9 in the Karami bloc
- 6 in the Frangieh bloc
- 5 in the Jumblatt bloc (plus the five Progressive Socialist Party MPs)
- 4 in the Hezbollah bloc (plus the eight Hezbollah MPs)
- 4 in the Murr bloc
- 3 in the Hariri bloc
- 3 in the Armenian Revolutionary Federation bloc (plus one MP from the party)
- 1 in the Hubayqa bloc (plus the Promise Party MP)
