= 1996 Lebanese general election =

- 18 August and 15 September 1996

All 128 seats to the Parliament of Lebanon
- Turnout: 43.29% (▲12.94pp)
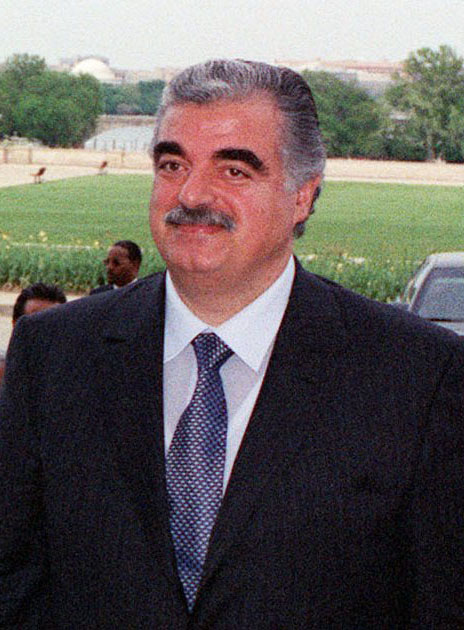

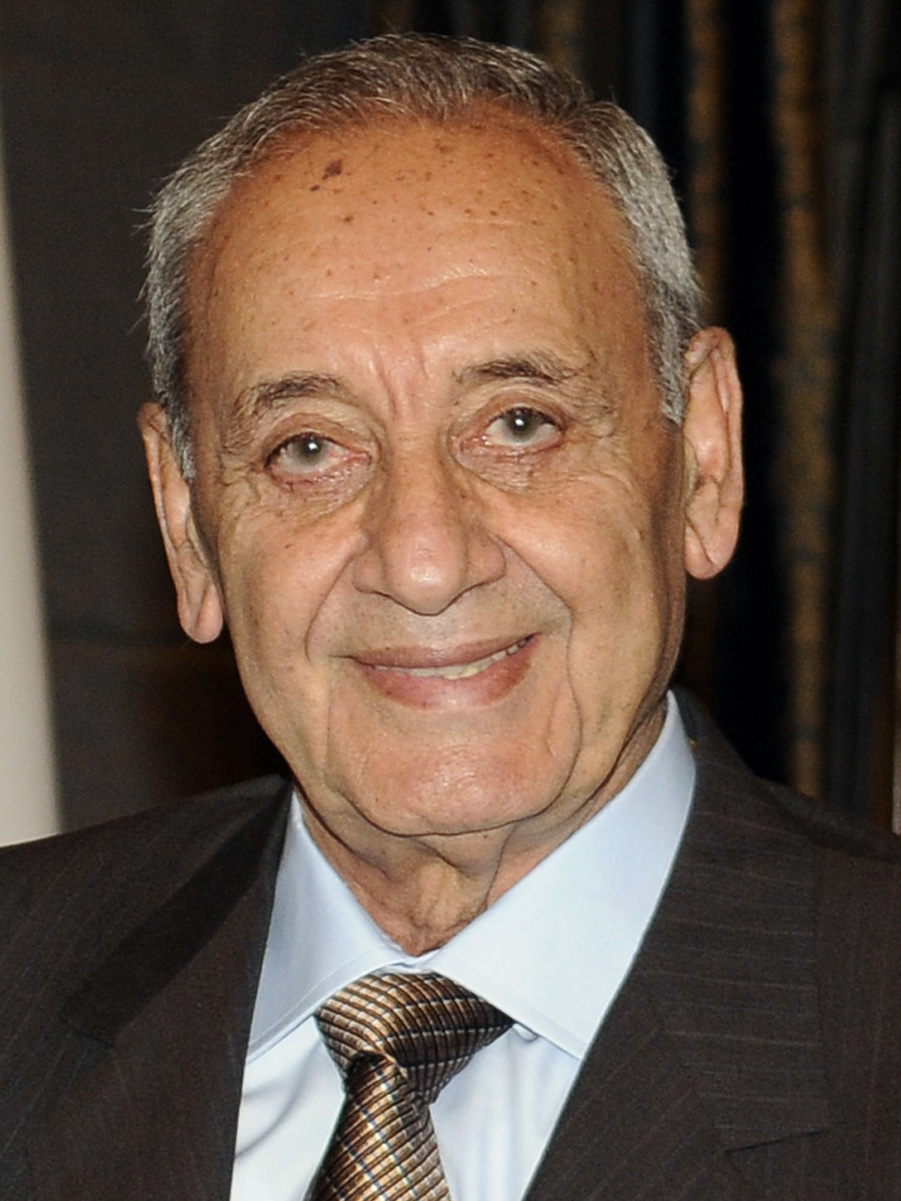

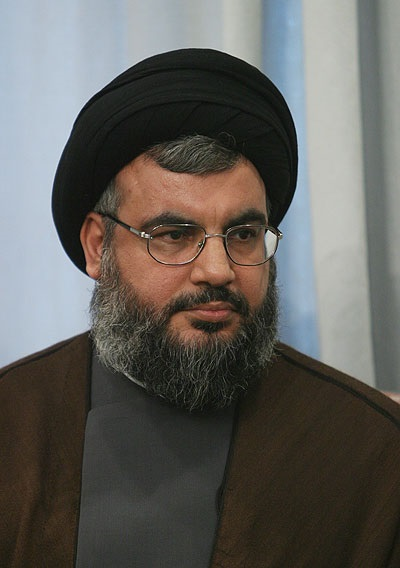

	First party	Second party
Leader	Rafic Hariri	Nabih Berri
Party	Hariri Bloc	Amal Movement
Leader's seat	Beirut	Zahrani
Seats won	25	8
	Third party	Fourth party
Leader	Hassan Nasrallah	Walid Jumblatt
Party	Hezbollah	PSP
Leader's seat	None	Chouf
Seats won	7	5
Prime Minister before election
Rafic Hariri
Independent
Elected Prime Minister
Rafic Hariri
Independent

General elections were held in Lebanon between 18 August and 15 September 1996. Independent candidates won the majority of seats, although most of them were considered members of various blocs. Voter turnout was 43.3%.

== Results ==
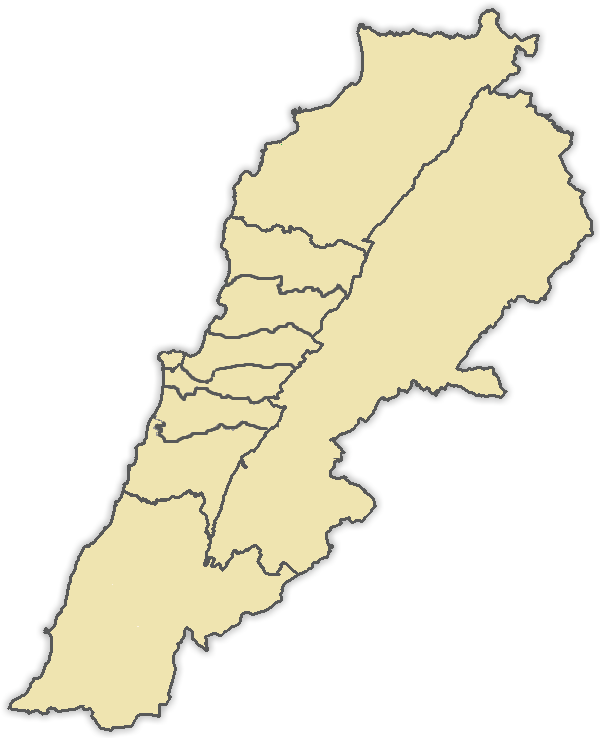
Electoral districts per the 1996 vote law

Party	Votes	%	Seats	+/–
Amal Movement			8	+3
Hezbollah			7	–1
Syrian Social Nationalist Party			5	–1
Progressive Socialist Party			5	0
Arab Socialist Ba'ath Party			2	0
Islamic Group			1	–2
Toilers League			1	0
Popular Nasserist Organization			1	0
Promise Party			1	0
Armenian Revolutionary Federation			1	0
Social Democrat Hunchakian Party			1	0
Armenian Democratic Liberal Party			1	+1
Arab Democratic Party			0	–1
Al-Ahbash			0	–1
Kataeb Party			0	New
Independents			94	+2
Total			128	+29
Total votes	1,113,130	–		
Registered voters/turnout	2,571,476	43.29		
Source: Nohlen et al.

Of the 94 independent MPs, 66 were considered to be members of various blocs:

- 25 in the Hariri bloc
- 13 in the Berri bloc (plus the eight Amal Movement MPs)
- 5 in the Hrawi bloc
- 5 in the Murr bloc
- 4 in the Jumblatt bloc (plus the five Progressive Socialist Party MPs)
- 4 in the Salim el-Hoss bloc
- 4 in the Frangieh bloc
- 3 in the Armenian Revolutionary Federation bloc (plus one MP from the party)
- 2 in the Hezbollah bloc (plus the seven Hezbollah MPs)
- 1 in the Hobeika bloc (plus the Promise Party MP)

== Voting ==
The elections were held over five successive Sundays. The first, 18 August, were held for the thirty-five seats allocated to Mount Lebanon. This included North Metn, Keserwan & Byblos, Baabda, Chouf & Aley. Hariri allies won 32 of the seats with a turnout of 45%. In August the Constitutional Court had ruled that the allocation of five districts to the Chouf was invalid since it treated districts differently. The allocation was widely seen as a mechanism that ensured Walid Jumblatt’s election. Parliament overruled the Courts objection citing “exceptional circumstances”. Some of these districts faced a boycott by supporters of general Michel Aoun and of the Lebanese Forces. In the Chouf Jumblatt faced opposition from fellow Druze Talal Arslan. Elie Hobeika was standing in Baabda and had support from Hizbullah.

The second round, 25 August, was for the twenty-eight seats in North Lebanon. The majority of the candidates here were pro-Syrian and voting was based on family and clan affiliations. Sunni boss Omar Karami was elected as was the young Maronite Suleiman Franjieh.

In Greater Beirut Rafik Hariri was reported to have spent $5 million campaigning and his allies won 13 of the 19 seats. His rival Selim Hoss was elected, as was independent Tamam Salam and Hariri critic Najah Wakim (Greek Orthodox). Hizbullah MP Muhammad Barjawi lost his seat.

The South Lebanon voting, 8 September, 14 of the 23 seats allocated to Shia candidates under Lebanons confessional system. One analyst estimated that Hizbullah would win 60% of the vote in a straight contest due to their popularity for their part in the reconstruction work following the Israeli bombardment in April. Their rival Amal were designated 17 seats and Hizbullah 4 in the joint Shia list. Voting in Sidon was slit between Bahia Hariri, the Nasserist Mustapha Saad and an Amal candidate.

The Beqaa vote took place on 15 September with 14 of the 23 seats reserved for Shia candidates. On 28 August Hassan Nasrallah had announced the fielding of an independent Hizbullah list. After two days of intense negotiations in Damascus this list was replaced by a list led by Hussein Husseini an old style Shia politician and rival of both Amal and Hizbullah.

The final results gave the Hariri block 20 MPs; Nabih Berri of Amal led a cross-confessional block of 20; the Jumblatt block had 10; Hizbullah had 7 MPs plus 2 allies; Michel Murr (SSNP) had 5 and Elias Hrawi had 4. Hariri's government was left facing an opposition of around 20 MPs. These included Salim Hoss, Omar Karami, Najam Wakim, Hussein Husseini, Sulayman Franjieh and the Hizbullah bloc.

In May 1997, following a Judicial review of seventeen of the contests, four MPs lost their seats due to serious electoral infractions. They were Fawzi Hubaysh, Minister of Culture, Akkar; Emile Nawfal, Byblos; Henri Shadid and Khaled Daher.

== Local elections ==
In November 1997 the Constitutional Court ruled against the new government's decision to postpone local elections for two years. There had been no local elections since 1963. It had been originally announced that the elections would take place in April 1998. Under the Lebanese system voters were registered by their place of birth. There were fifteen thousand positions to be filled. Municipal funds had not been dispersed since the 1980s. Local elections were promised as part of the Taif agreement. It was speculated that amongst the reasons for the delay was the possible negative outcome for some of the leaders of the major blocs. Nabih Berri was believed to lack grassroots support. Rafic Hariri was likely to lose his home town of Sidon. Interior Minister Michel Murr proposed that council members should be appointed in the security zone.
