= 2000 Lebanese general election =

- 27 August and 3 September 2000

All 128 seats in the Parliament of Lebanon
- Turnout: 40.52% (▼3.04pp)
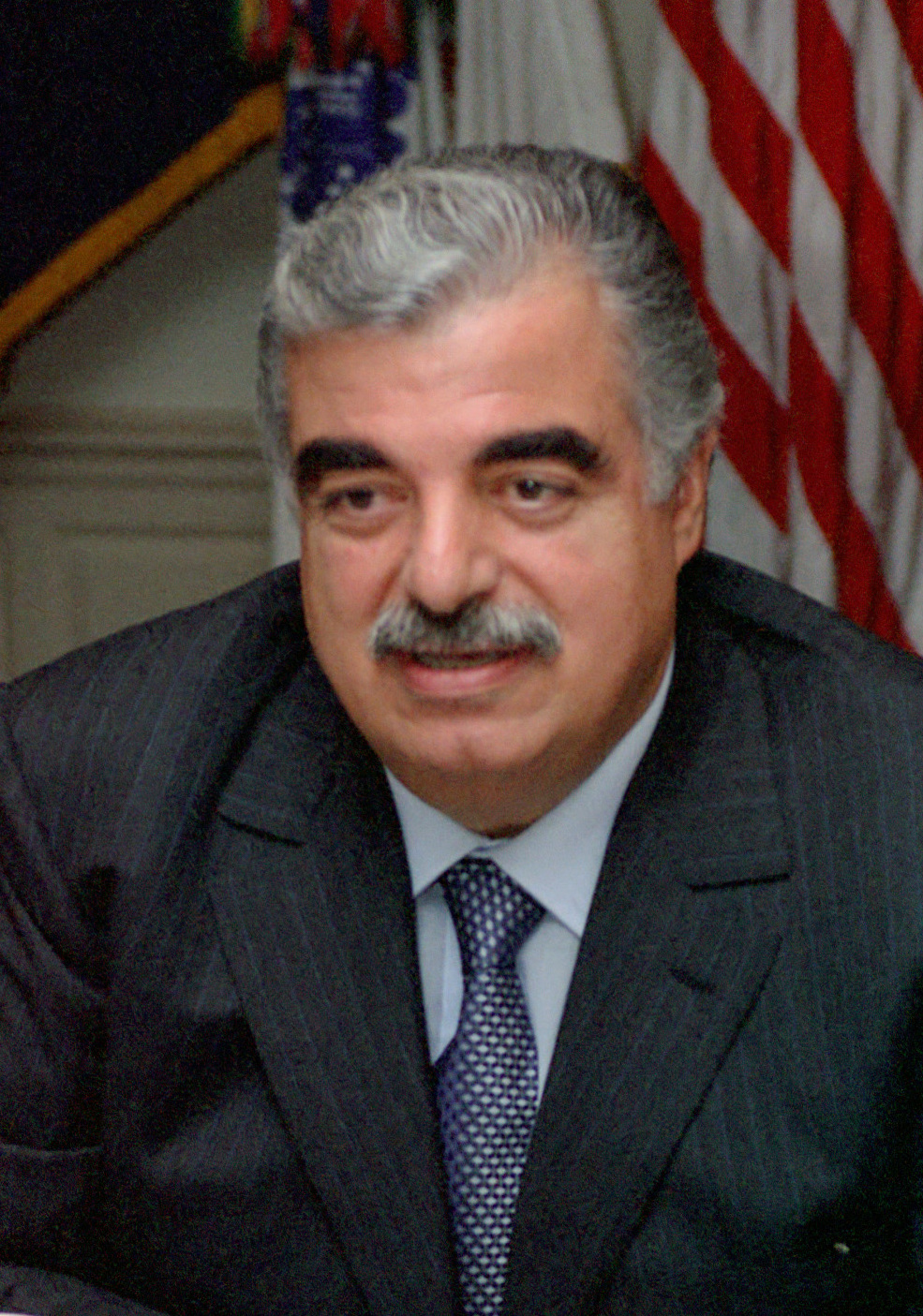

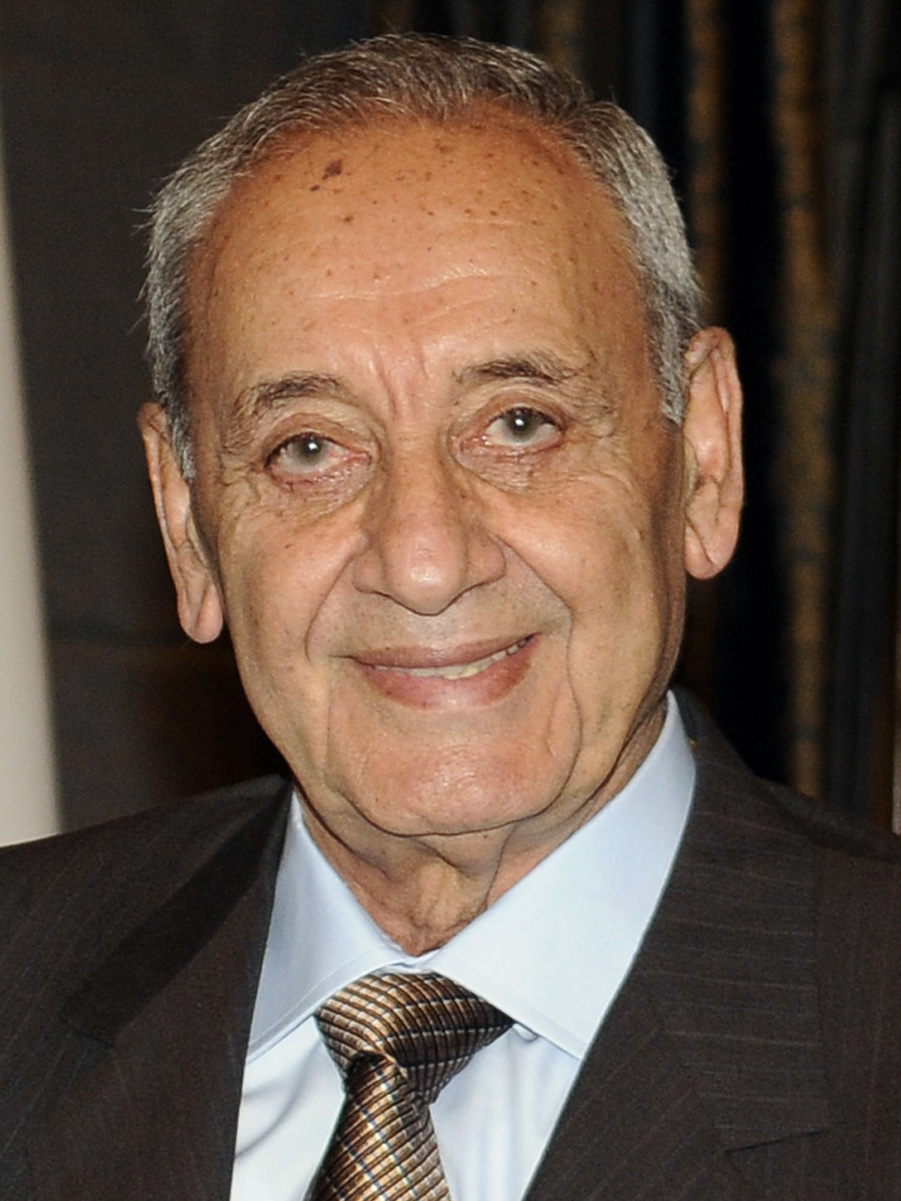

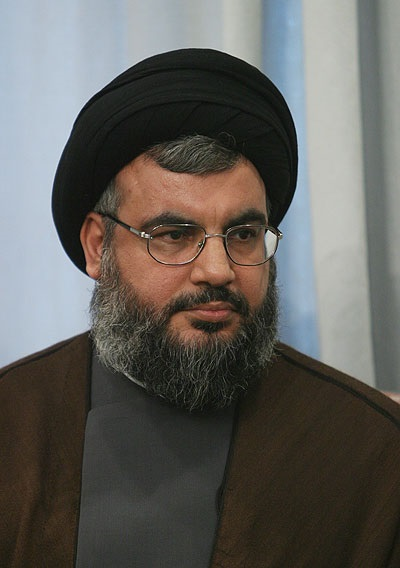

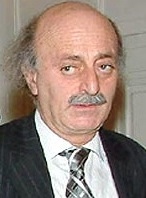
	First party	Second party
Leader	Rafic Hariri	Nabih Berri
Party	Hariri Bloc	Amal Movement
Leader's seat	Beirut	Zahrani
Last election	25 seats	8 seats
Seats won	26	10
Seat change	▲1	▲2
	Third party	Fourth party
Leader	Hassan Nasrallah	Walid Jumblatt
Party	Hezbollah	PSP
Leader's seat	None	Chouf
Last election	7 seats	5 seats
Seats won	10	6
Seat change	▲3	▲1
Prime Minister before election
Selim Hoss
Independent
Elected Prime Minister
Rafic Hariri
Independent

General elections were held in Lebanon between 27 August and 3 September 2000 to elect the 128 members of the Parliament of Lebanon. Independent candidates won the majority of seats, although most of them were considered members of various blocs. Voter turnout was 40.5%.

== Results ==
Party	Votes	%	Seats	+/–
Hezbollah			10	+3
Amal Movement			10	+2
Progressive Socialist Party			6	+1
Syrian Social Nationalist Party			4	–1
Arab Socialist Ba'ath Party			3	+1
Kataeb Party			2	+2
National Bloc			2	New
Armenian Revolutionary Federation			2	0
Social Democrat Hunchakian Party			1	0
Armenian Democratic Liberal Party			1	+1
Popular Nasserist Organization			1	0
Islamic Group			0	–1
Toilers League			0	–1
Promise Party			0	–1
Arab Democratic Party			0	–1
Al-Ahbash			0	–1
Independents			86	–8
Total			128	0
Total votes	1,112,776	–		
Registered voters/turnout	2,746,528	40.52		
Source: Nohlen et al.

Of the 86 independent MPs, 48 were considered to be members of various blocs:

- 26 in the Hariri bloc
- 6 in the Berri bloc (plus the ten Amal Movement MPs)
- 6 in the Jumblatt bloc (plus the six Progressive Socialist Party MPs)
- 5 in the Faranjiyyah bloc
- 3 in the Murr bloc
- 2 in the Hezbollah bloc (plus the ten Hezbollah MPs)
- 1 in the Kataeb bloc (plus the party's two MPs)
