= Minorities (Lebanon) =

Six recognized Christian sects in Lebanon

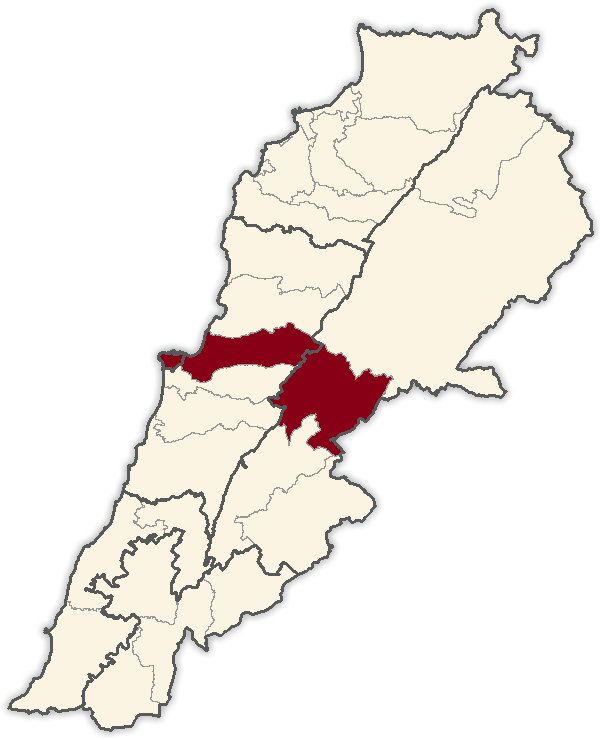
Districts where 4–5% of the registered voters belong to Minorities.

In Lebanese politics, Minorities (Arabic: أقليات ’Aqaliyāt) is a term that includes six different Christian sects; Syriac Orthodox, Syriac Catholics, Assyrian Church of the East, Chaldean Catholics, Latin Catholics, and Coptic Orthodox. 1 of the 128 seats in the national parliament is allocated to Minorities (all seats in the Lebanese parliament are allocated to different confessional groups). The Minorities' seat is elected from Beirut III electoral district, an electoral district with a large Sunni Muslim majority (65.25% of the registered voters).

According to data released by the Ministry of Interior and Municipalities in 2011 (not an official census as such), there were 42,715 registered Minorities voters (1.28% of all registered voters in the country). Electoral districts with significant Minorities populations were Beirut I 10,063 voters (11% of the registered voters in the electoral district, overwhelmingly Syriac Catholics), Beirut III 8,181 voters (3.18%), Metn 7,802 voters (4.56%), Zahle 7,225 voters (4.51%) and Beirut II 3,529 voters (3.44%). In the capital Beirut (all three districts combined) Minorities represented 4.83% of the registered voters.

== History ==
=== French period ===
A Minorities seat has existed in Lebanese politics since the first elections in 1922. However, the sects included in the Minorities concept has varied over time. During the first elections there were no separate seats for Protestants and Armenians, so they were included in Minorities as well. A separate Armenian Orthodox seat was instituted in 1934 and separate Protestant and Armenian Catholic seats were created in 1951.

In 1925, Michel Chiha, a Latin Catholic banker and journalist, was elected from the Beirut Minorities seat in the Representative Council.

In 1929, Abdallah Ishak, an Armenian Catholic, was elected from the Minorities seat.

In the 1934 elections, the battle for the Beirut Minorities seat stood mainly between the pro-government candidate Ayoub Tabet and Abdallah Ishak, contesting on the list of Abdallah Yafi. Ishak got more votes than Tabet in the first round, but lost to Tabet in the second round.

In the 1937 elections, the Beirut Minorities seat was won by Chafic Nassif.

=== From Independence to Civil War ===
In the 1943 elections, the first to be held after independence from France, Ayoub Tabet (contesting on the list of Sami as-Solh) and Moussa de Freige (contesting on the list of Yafi) vyed for the Beirut Minorities seat. Tabet was elected with 5,740 votes against 5,561 for de Freige. De Freige won the seat in the 1947 elections, standing as the pro-government candidate. The Kataeb Party general secretary Joseph Chader was the main opposition candidate for the seat.

For the 1951 elections, separate Protestant and Armenian Catholic seats were set up in Beirut. Thus candidates from these communities no longer contested the Minorities seat. Moussa de Freige, standing on the so-called List of Giants, was re-elected.

In the 1953 election, the Minorities seat was allocated to the Beirut V – Minet El Hosn electoral district. As the Armenian Catholics had lost their separate seat, they again contested this seat. The Syriac Catholic Patriarch Ignatius Gabriel I Tappouni supported Edmond Rabbath. On the other hand, Joseph Chader enjoyed support from the Jewish voters, who were generally sympathetic to the Kataeb Party. Chader narrowly defeated Rabbath, having obtained 2,081 votes against 1,922 for Rabbath.

For the 1957 election, Beirut was divided into two constituencies. The Minorities seat was allocated to the second constituency, which consisted of Mudawar, Bashoura, Zokak Blat, Ras Beirut, Ain Mraysé, Minet El Hosn and Port. The Armenian Catholics regained their separate seat, which was elected from the same constituency. Chafic Nassif won the Minorities seat with 14,471 votes. The main contender was Farid Jubran who got 10,923 votes.

As per the 1960 Election Law, the Minorities seat was allocated to the Beirut II electoral district. At the time Minorities included Syrian Orthodox, Syrian Catholics, Latin Catholics, Assyrians, Chaldeans and Jews. As of 1960 Beirut II had 2,435 Minorities voters (5.65% of the voters in the electoral district). Farid Jubran, a Latin Catholic belonging to the Progressive Socialist Party, won the Minorities seat in the 1960, 1964, 1968 and 1972 elections.

=== Post-war period ===
In the 1992 and 1996 elections, Beirut was a single electoral district. Per the 2000 Election Law, used for the 2000 and 2005 elections, the Minorities seat was allotted to Beirut's second district (Bashoura-Rmeil-Moseitebeh). In the 2008 election law, the Minorities seat was allocated to Beirut III, consisting of Zokak Blat, Ras Beirut, Ain Mraysé, Minet El Hosn, Mazraa and Moseitebeh. Nabil de Freige was elected from the Minorities seat in 2000, 2005 and 2009.

In the constituency with the biggest share of Minorities voters, Beirut I, it was estimated that 32.2% of the registered Syriac Catholic voters had cast their votes in the 2009 general election. 51.3% where estimated to have voted for the pro-government candidates and 46.9% for the opposition candidates.

As for the 2018 elections, Beirut will be divided into two districts. The Minorities seat will be allotted to Beirut's first district (Achrafiyeh-Rmeil-Saifi-Medawar). In 2018, Antoine Pano won the Minorities seat. He ran on the list of the FPM, Strong Lebanon bloc.

=== Electoral summary of the Minorities seat ===
Year	District	Sect	Party	Winning candidate	
1925	Beirut	Latin Catholic	Independent	Michel Chiha	
1927	Beirut	Protestant	Independent	Ayoub Tabet	
1929	Beirut	Armenian Catholic	Independent	Abdallah Ishak	68
1934	Beirut	Protestant	Independent	Ayoub Tabet	7,521
1937	Beirut	Syriac Catholic	Kataeb Party	Chafic Nassif	22,554
1943	Beirut	Protestant	Independent	Ayoub Tabet	5,740
1947	Beirut	Latin Catholic	Independent	Moussa de Freige	15,752
1951	Beirut	Latin Catholic	Independent	Moussa de Freige	12,747
1953	Beirut V	Armenian Catholic	Kataeb Party	Joseph Chader	2,081
1957	Beirut II	Syriac Catholic	National Liberal Party	Chafic Nassif	14,471
1960	Beirut II	Latin Catholic	Progressive Socialist Party	Farid Jubran	7,671
1964	Beirut II	Latin Catholic	Progressive Socialist Party	Farid Jubran	4,331
1968	Beirut II	Latin Catholic	Progressive Socialist Party	Farid Jubran	8,049
1972	Beirut II	Latin Catholic	Progressive Socialist Party	Farid Jubran	9,333
1992	Beirut	Syriac Orthodox	Independent	Ibrahim Asmar	8,645
1996	Beirut	Syriac Orthodox	Independent	Jamil Abdelmassih	39,636
2000	Beirut II	Latin Catholic	Future Movement	Nabil De Freige	26,351
2005	Beirut II	Latin Catholic	Future Movement	Nabil De Freige	27,364
2009	Beirut III	Latin Catholic	Future Movement	Nabil De Freige	
2018	Beirut I	Syriac Orthodox	Free Patriotic Movement	Antoine Pano	539
2022	Beirut I	Syriac Catholic	ReLebanon	Cynthia Zarazir	486
