= Joseph Chader =

First Armenian minister of Lebanese government

Joseph Chader (Arabic: جوزيف شادر; 1907 – March 28, 1977) was a Lebanese politician. He was a Member of Parliament between 1951 and 1977, and served as deputy speaker at times. In 1958 he became the first Armenian government minister in Lebanon. He served as vice chairman of the Kataeb Party.

== Background ==
Joseph Chader was born in Beirut in 1907 to an Armenian Catholic family. He was the son of an Armenian refugee from Diyarbakir, Antoine Chader. Antoine Chader had been active in the Patriotic Union.

Joseph Chader studied at Ecole des frères in Beirut. In 1925 he began studying law at the French Law Institute, graduating in 1928 with good grades. After his graduation as a lawyer, he began working at the office for the Armenian parliamentarian Abdallah Ishak.

== Kataeb ==
In 1936 he took part in founding the Kataeb Party. As of 1937 Chader was a member of the Executive Committee of the party. In that year he also served as chairman of the Disciplinary Committee of the party. Then he became general secretary of the party, a post he held until 1951.

During the 1943 October revolt, Chader led the Kataeb and Najjadeh combine against the French forces.

== 1947 election ==
In 1947 he was included as the Beirut Minorities candidate on the opposition 'Reformist List' for the parliamentary election. However, on the election day, Chader and other opposition candidates alleged that the election was being rigged and called on their followers to abstain from voting. Official results gave him 3,168 votes (14.7%), finishing in second place for the Minorities seat.

== 1951 election ==
In 1951 Chader was named vice chairman of the Kataeb Party. Ahead of the 1951 general election a separate Armenian Catholic seat had been instituted. By this time Chader had become the vice chairman of the Kataeb Party. The Armenian Catholic Church reached a deal with the Kataeb Party, to nominate Chader for the new reserved seat. The so-called 'List of Giants' decided not to field an official Armenian Catholic candidate. Henri Pharaon called on his followers to vote for Chader for the Armenian Catholic seat whilst Abdullah Yafi and Sami Solh appealed for a vote for Elie Khayat. Chader won the seat, having obtained 9,660 votes (44%) whilst Khayat got 2,257 votes. Chader was the sole Kataeb candidate able to get elected.

== 1953 election ==
However, ahead of the 1953 general election the Armenian Catholic seat was abolished. Chader again contested the Minorities seat, now allocated to the Beirut V – Minet El Hosn electoral district. Notably, the Armenian Catholic weekly Massis did not support his campaign. However he obtained strong support from the local Jewish community, which was largely sympathetic to the Kataeb Party. He won the seat, having garnered 2,081 votes (35.6%). Again, Chader was the sole Kataeb member elected to parliament.

== 1957 election ==
In the 1957 general election Chader was named as the Armenian Catholic candidate (the Armenian Catholic seat had been reinstituted) on the list of Sami Solh in the second electoral district of Beirut. He won the seat, obtaining 16,670 votes (~53.8%).

== 1958 Minister ==
On March 14, 1958, in the backdrop of a national crisis in which Armenians participated on both sides, Chader was named Minister of Planning in the cabinet of Sami Solh. He thus became the first Armenian to become a national government minister. Moreover, he was the second Kataeb member to serve as a government minister (Jean Skaff had been a minister in the interim cabinet of May 12-August 18, 1953). Chader's tenure as Minister lasted until September 24, 1958.

== 1960 election ==
In the 1960 general election Chader was named as the Armenian Catholic candidate of the joint Kataeb-Armenian Revolutionary Federation (Tashnaq) 'People's List' in Beirut I electoral district. He won the seat, having obtained 21,765 votes according to official sources. According to an unofficial summary covering most of the polling booths, Chader got the vote of 98.1% of the Jewish voters who cast their ballots, 86.5% of the Maronites, 76.2% of the Greek Catholic, 61.7% of the Greek Orthodox, 58% of the Armenian Orthodox, 78.1% of other Christian groups (such as Latin Catholics, Assyrians, Chaldean Catholics) and 28.7% of the Muslim vote.

== 1964 and 1968 elections ==
In the 1964 general election he was again the Armenian Catholic candidate on the Kataeb-Tashnaq list in Beirut I. He was elected unopposed, along with all other candidates of that list. Likewise, Chader was the Armenian Catholic candidate of Kataeb and Tashnaq in the 1968 general election in Beirut I and was again elected unopposed.

== 1972 election ==
In the 1972 general election Chader was the Armenian Catholic candidate on a joint Kataeb-Tashnaq-National Liberal list in Beirut I. He was re-elected, obtaining 27,663 votes (79.4%).

Chader served as Minister of State in the cabinet of Takieddine Solh between July 8, 1973 and October 31, 1974.

== Death ==
Chader died on March 28, 1977. As no new elections were held during the Lebanese Civil War, the Armenian Catholic parliamentary seat remained vacant until his son Antoine Chader was appointed as Member of Parliament in 1991.

== Honours ==
Chader was awarded the National Order of the Cedar, with rank of officer. He also received the rank of Knight Commander of the Order of St. Gregory the Great.
