= Beirut V – Minet El Hosn electoral district =

Electoral district in Lebanon, 1953

Beirut V - Minet El Hosn
- Former constituency for the Parliament of Lebanon
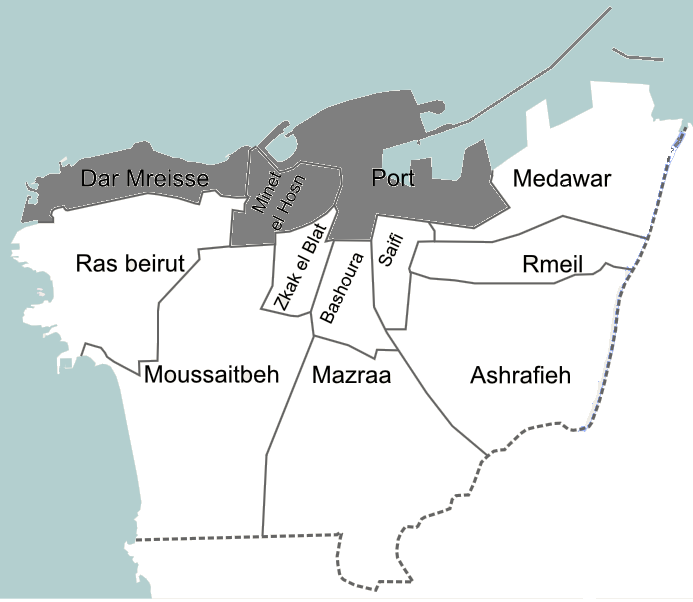
- Governorate: Beirut
- Electorate: 13,890

Former constituency
- Created: 1952
- Abolished: 1957
- Number of members: 1 (Minorities)
- MP: Joseph Chader (1953-1957)

Beirut V – Minet El Hosn was an electoral district in Lebanon, used in the 1953 parliamentary election. The electoral district covered three neighbourhoods of Beirut and elected a Minorities parliamentarian. Joseph Chader of the Kataeb Party was elected from the district in 1953.

== New election law ==
The 1953 election was the first parliamentary election in Lebanon with a new electoral system which allowed candidates to win with a plurality of votes, rather than requiring a second round. Female universal suffrage was introduced whilst voting was made compulsory for men, as per the November 1952 Election Law. Moreover, the number of seats in the parliament was reduced from 77 to 44. Most of the electoral districts now elected only a single parliamentarian, rather than the usual system in Lebanon where several parliamentarians are elected from a larger district. The November 1952 Election Law had also abolished the separate seat for Armenian Catholics.

Beirut V - Minet el Hosn covered three neighbourhoods (quartiers) of the capital Beirut; Minet El Hosn, Dar Mreisse and Port. The district elected a single parliamentarian, belonging to Minorities. The district had 13,890 registered voters.

== Candidates in 1953 election ==
The contenders for the Beirut V seat were Joseph Chader, Edmond Rabbath, Farid Jubran, Chafic Nassif and Jemil Attié.

=== Joseph Chader ===
Chader was the vice chairman of the Kataeb Party. He had won the Armenian Catholic seat in the 1951 parliamentary election. As the Kataeb Party had suffered a backlash in the 1951 election, it only fielded two candidates in 1953, Chader and Maurice Gemayel in Beirut II (Achrafieh-Rmeil-Saifi). Chader had the support from a large part of the Jewish community, which tended to support the Kataeb Party.

=== Edmond Rabbath ===
Rabbath was the candidate of the National Call Party. Born in Aleppo and educated at the Sorbonne in Paris, he had been one of the architects of the 1928 Syrian constitution. He was a prominent Syrian nationalist. Rabbath had been a leading figure in the National Bloc in Syria in the 1930s. Before the 1953 election he had become a Lebanese citizen. His candidature was supported by the Syriac Catholic Patriarch Ignatius Gabriel I Tappouni.

=== Chafic Nassif ===
Nassif had been one of the founders of the Kataeb Party. But he left the party and became a follower of Camille Chamoun. He was a lawyer by profession.

=== Farid Jubran ===
Jubran, a Latin Catholic, was one of the co-founders of the Progressive Socialist Party.

== Voting ==
Chader won the seat, obtaining 2,081 votes (40.9%). Rabbath got 1,922 votes (37.8%), Nassif 1,097 votes (21.6%), Jubran 646 votes (12.7%) and Attié 55 votes (1.1%). 41.8% of the registered voters cast their votes.

In the subsequent 1957 parliamentary election, multi-member electoral districts were reintroduced. The neighbourhoods of the 1953 Beirut V district were included in the Muslim-dominated second district of Beirut.
