= Beirut II (1960) =

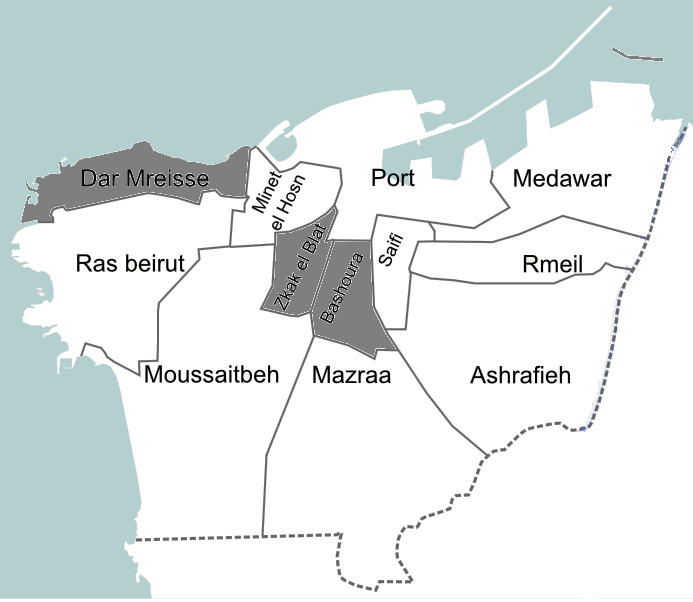
Beirut II electoral district 1960-1972

Beirut II was a parliamentary constituency in Lebanon. It covered three neighbourhoods (quartiers) of the capital; Dar El Mreisse, Zuqaq al-Blat and Bachoura. Michael Hudson described Beirut II as a 'small "catch-all" district'. This constituency was used in the 1960, 1964, 1968 and 1972 elections.

== 1960 Election Law ==
	Sunni	Shia	Minorities
1960	Adnan al-Hakim	Muhsin Salim	Farid Jubran
1964	Sami as-Solh	Rashid Baydoun	Farid Jubran
1968	Adnan al-Hakim	Abd al-Majid az-Zayn	Farid Jubran
1972	Rashid as-Solh	Mohammad Youssef Beydoun	Farid Jubran

The constituency was established as part of the 1960 Election Law. In the 1957 parliamentary election Beirut had been divided into two constituencies, and Dar El Mreisse, Zuqaq al-Blat and Bachoura had been part of the same constituency as Minet el Hosn, Port, Ras Beirut and Medawar. The issue of the delimitations of the Beirut constituencies had been contested, but an agreement between Christian and Muslim leaders was reached on February 23, 1960, by which there was agreement that Beirut II would be assigned two Muslim seats and one Maronite seat. The Election Law was passed in April 1960, with three seats for Beirut II (1 Sunni, 1 Shia, 1 Minorities).

== Demographics ==
Beirut II was described as a sort of 'buffer zone' between the Muslim West Beirut and the Christian East Beirut. As of 1960 it was estimated that Beirut II had 18,740 Sunni Muslim voters, 10,153 Shia Muslims, 3,103 Maronites, 1,153 Greek Orthodox, 1,168 Greek Catholic, 3,736 Armenian Orthodox, 2,435 Minorities, 952 Armenian Catholics, 731 Protestants and 863 Druze.

== 1960 election ==
In the 1960 parliamentary election a list radicals led by Adnan al-Hakim won the three seats, defeating notable leaders like Rashid Baydoun, Moussa de Freige and Takieddin el-Solh. The Najjadeh Party leader Al-Hakim won the Sunni seat, prominent liberal Muhsin Salim won the Shia seat and Farid Jubran (Latin Catholic, belonging to the Progressive Socialist Party) won the Minorities seat. It was believed that Kataeb advances in Mount Lebanon had prompted the Muslim voters in Beirut II to back al-Hakim whilst most Christian voters had abstained. Moreover, al-Hakim was believed to have gotten support from leftwing Armenians sympathizing with the Huntchak Party.

== 1964 and 1968 elections ==
In the 1964 parliamentary election Sami as-Solh emerged victorious, probably with the support from the Christian voters. As-Solh defeated al-Hakim with a margin of just 75 votes. Rashid Baydoun won the Shia seat. Jubran retained the Minorities seat. In the Lebanese general election, 1968 in Beirut II a list of al-Hakim, Jubran and Abd al-Majid az-Zayn (Shia) won the three seats and defeated the candidatures of Sami and Takieddin as-Solh.

== 1972 election ==
In the 1972 parliamentary election, the last to be held before the outbreak of the Lebanese Civil War, a list of Rashid as-Solh (allied with the Lebanese National Movement) and Jubran won a landslide in Beirut II. Al-Hakim lost his seat. However, the Shia candidate on the al-Hakim list Mohammad Yousuf Baydoun was elected.

After the Civil War, a new set-up of constituencies was used ahead of the 1992 general election abolishing the 1960 Election Law constituencies.
