= 1968 Lebanese general election in Beirut II =

Voting to elect three members of the Lebanese parliament took place in the Beirut II district (one of three electoral districts in the city) on March 24, 1968, part of the national general election of that year. The constituency had 34,113 eligible voters, out of whom 17,004 voted.

Beirut II, which was a sort of 'buffer zone' between the Christian and Muslim districts of the city, filled 1 Sunni Muslim seat, 1 Shia Muslim seat and 1 seat for Minorities (for more information about the Lebanese election system, see Elections in Lebanon). There was one multi-candidate ticket with three names, headed by Adnan al-Hakim. Twelve other candidates ran on individual tickets.

The elections in Beirut II passed smoothly without violent incidents, but rumours of purchasing of votes flourished. The three candidates on the Adnan al-Hakim ticket were elected, with seven to eight thousand votes apiece. These included Sunni Al-Hakim, the Najjadeh Party chairman; Shiite Abd al-Majid az-Zayn, a retired colonel; and minority representative Farid Jubran, who owned a Beirut auditing firm. Jubran belonged to the National Struggle Front, and later became the vice chairman of the Progressive Socialist Party.

The incumbent parliamentarian and former prime minister Sami as-Solh earned four thousand votes, the highest of the unsuccessful Sunnis. Another member of the as-Sohl family, Taqieddin as-Solh, also vied for the Sunni seat. The remaining two Sunni candidates were 32-year-old Farud Shihab ad-Din and Jamil Mihhu. Notably, Mihhu was the first Kurdish candidate to run for office in Lebanon. Mihhu later became the leader of the Kurdish Democratic Party in Lebanon.

In the Shiite seat the incumbent minister Rashid Baydun lost by only 500 votes. Baydun had previously contested elections in the south and was connected to the southern Shiite leadership. Lawyer Shafiq Nasif (a Latin Catholic) was the main challenger in the Minorities seat. Other candidates in the fray (either Shiite or Minorities) were Yusuf Atiyah, Antoine Malaki, Shukri Qadadu, Thomas Masbarian, Jurj Abaji, and Abd al-Haim ash-Shaykh.
