= 1968 Lebanese general election in Bsharri District =

Voting to elect two members of the Lebanese parliament took place in the Bsharri District (a rural area in northern Lebanon) in 1968, part of the national general election of that year. Both of the seats of the constituency were earmarked for the Maronite community (for more information about the Lebanese election system, see Elections in Lebanon). Bsharri District had 32,814 eligible voters, out of whom 16,064 voted. Three separate tickets contested the election. The election was carried out without reports of violent incidents.

== Candidates ==
Six candidates contested on three different tickets. The different candidatures represented different family interests in the area.

- Kayruz/al-Khuri ticket: The two incumbent parliamentarians of the district, Habib Kayruz and Qabalan Isa al-Khuri joined hands and ran on the same ticket. Habib Kayruz was an independent parliamentarian who had been elected in 1960 and 1964 and led the Lebanese Hotels Syndicate. A landlord and a lawyer, Al-Khuri was a member of the Democratic Front.
- Mu'arbas/Sukkar ticket: Antoine Mu'arbas of the Kataeb Party and Butrus Sukkar of the National Liberal Party ran on a joint ticket. Both of the men had vied unsuccessfully for a parliamentary seat in the 1964 election. Mu'arbas held a Doctorate in Law whilst Sukkar, just thirty years old, was also a lawyer by profession. The Kataeb Party organized an electoral campaign for their candidate, Mu'arbas.
- Tuq/Ja'ja' ticket: Sa'id Tuq (landlord and former parliamentarian) and Hasib Ja'ja' (lawyer by profession) ran on a joint ticket. Both of the men were independents.

== Results ==
Habib Kayruz and Qabalan Isa al-Khuri were re-elected, albeit their margins of victory had shrunk compared to the 1964 election.

Candidate	Votes
Habib Kayruz	4,732
Qabalan Isa al-Khuri	3,593
Hasib Ja'ja'	3,064
Sa'id Tuq	2,778
Antoine Mu'arbas	2,476
Butrus Sukkar	1,521
