= 1953 Lebanese general election =

- 12 July–9 August 1953
- All 44 seats in the Parliament of Lebanon; 23 seats needed for a majority
- Turnout: 49.99% (▼4.76pp)
Party	Leader	Seats	+/–
Constitutional Bloc	Camille Chamoun	3	−2
National Bloc	Raymond Eddé	3	0
Kataeb	Pierre Gemayel	1	−2
PSP	Kamal Jumblatt	1	−1
ARF		1	−1
Independent	–	35	−27
This lists parties that won seats. See the complete results below.
Prime Minister before	Prime Minister after
Saeb Salam; Unaffiliated	Abdallah El-Yafi; Unaffiliated

General elections were held in Lebanon between 12 July and 9 August 1953, the first under the new electoral system which allowed candidates to win with a plurality of votes, rather than requiring a second round. Independent candidates won the majority of seats. Voter turnout was 50.0%. Candidate Kazem al-Khalil of Tyre constituency won unopposed.

== Apportionment of seats over districts and communities ==
	tot.	Ma	GO	GC	AO	AC	Mi	Su	Sh	Dr	subdivision
tot.	44	13	5	3	1	1	1	9	8	3	
Beirut-1	1					1					1: Medawar
Beirut-2	2	1	1								2: Achrafieh, Rmeil, Saifi
Beirut-3	1							1			3: Mazraa
Beirut-4	2							1	1		4: Ras Beirut, Zkak El Blat, Bachoura, Moussaytbeh
Beirut-5	1						1				5: Mina El Hossn, Dar El Mreiseh, the Port
Zahleh (number?)	1		1								subdivision unknown
Zahleh (number?)	1			1							subdivision unknown
Baalbek - Hermel	2								2		
Rashaya - West Bekaa	2		1					1			
Jbeil	1	1									
Keserwan	1	1									
Keserwan El Ftouh	1	1									
North Metn	2	1	1								
Bourj Hammoud (Metn)	1				1						
Baabda	2	1								1	
Aley	2	1								1	
Deir El Kamar - Cheheem (Chouf)	2	1						1			
Baaklyn - Joun (Chouf)	2			1						1	
Akkar	2		1					1			
Dennieh	1							1			
Tripoli-1	1							1			1: Kalmoun, Haddadeen, Nouri, Roummaneh, Mahatra, Askeleh
Tripoli-2	1							1			2: Kobbeh, Hadid, Soueikah, Tabbaneh, Zahrieh, Tall
Zghorta	1	1									
Koura	1	1									
Bsharrey	1	1									
Batroun	1	1									
Jezzine	2	1		1							
Saida (city)	1							1			
Zahrani (Saida villages)	1								1		
Nabatieh	1								1		
Tyre	1								1		
Bint Jbeil	1								1		
Marjeyoun - Hasbaya	1								1		

== Results ==
Party	Votes	%	Seats	+/–
Constitutional Bloc			3	–2
National Bloc			3	0
Kataeb Party			1	–2
Armenian Revolutionary Federation			1	–1
Progressive Socialist Party			1	–1
Armenian Democratic Liberal Party			0	0
Independents			35	–27
Total			44	–33
Total votes	389,932	–		
Registered voters/turnout	780,053	49.99		
Source: Nohlen et al.

=== Elected members ===
List of elected members
Constituency	Elected member	Name in Arabic	Affiliation	Demographic
Beirut I Medawar	Movses Der Kalustyan	موسيس دركالوستيان	Tashnag	Armenian Orthodox
Beirut II; Achrafieh - Rmeil - Saifi	Alfred Naccache	الفرد نقاش	Naccache-Tueni Alliance	Maronite
Beirut II; Achrafieh - Rmeil - Saifi	Ghassan Tueni	غسّان التويني	Syrian Nationalist-supported; Independent; Naccache-Tueni Alliance	Greek Orthodox
Beirut III; Mazraa	Abdallah El-Yafi	عبد الله اليافي	Independent	Sunni
Beirut IV; Ras Beirut - Moussaitbeh - Zuqaq al-Blat - Bachoura	Abdullah al-Hajj	عبد الله الحاج	Progressive Socialist-supported; Independent	Shiite
Beirut IV; Ras Beirut - Moussaitbeh - Zuqaq al-Blat - Bachoura	Sami Solh	سامي الصلح	Solh-Osseiran Alliance	Sunni
Beirut V Minet El Hosn - Dar Mreisse - Port	Joseph Chader	جوزيف شادر	Kataeb	Minority
Tripoli I	Hashem al-Husseini	هاشم الحسيني	Independent	Sunni
Tripoli II	Rashid Karami	رشيد كرامي	Karami	Sunni
Danniyeh	Nasouh Agha al-Fadel	نصوح آغا الفاضل	Fadel	Sunni
Koura	Fouad Ghosn	فؤاد غصن	Ghosn	Greek Orthodox
Bsharri	Saeed Touq	سعيد طوق	Independent	Maronite
Zgharta	Hamid Frangieh	حميد فرنجية	Constitutional; Frangieh	Maronite
Batroun	Jean Harb	جان حرب	Harb	Maronite
Akkar	Bashir al-Uthman	بشير العثمان	Aboud Alliance	Sunni
Akkar	Raouf Hanna	رؤوف حنا	Aboud Alliance	Greek Orthodox
Baakleen - Joun	Naim Moghabghab	نعيم مغبغب	Moghabghab-Takieddine Alliance	Greek Catholic
Baakleen - Joun	Kamal Jumblatt	كمال جنبلاط	Progressive Socialist; Jumblatt-Rizk Alliance	Druze
Aley	Georges Akl	جورج عقل	National; Akl-Arslan Alliance	Maronite
Aley	Majid Arslan	مجيد أرسلان	Akl-Arslan Alliance	Druze
Deir al Qamar	Emile Bustani	اميل البستاني	Bustani-Barjawi Alliance	Maronite
Deir al Qamar	Ahmed al-Barjawi	أحمد البرجاوي	Bustani-Barjawi Alliance	Sunni
Baabda	Bashir al-Awar	بشير الأعور	Awar-Eddé Alliance	Druze
Baabda	Pierre Eddé	بيار إده	National; Awar-Eddé Alliance	Maronite
Matn	Gabriel al-Murr	غبريال المرّ	Murr-Lahoud Alliance	Greek Orthodox
Matn	Emile Lahoud	اميل لحود	Murr-Lahoud Alliance	Maronite
Burj Hammoud	Dikran Tosbat	ديكران توسباط	Independent	Armenian Orthodox
Jbeil	Raymond Eddé	ريمون إده	National	Maronite
Al Futouh	Maurice Zouein	موريس زوين	Independent	Maronite
Keserwan	Clovis al-Khazen	كلوفيس الخازن	Constitutional	Maronite
Sidon	Nazih al-Bizri	نزيه البزري	Independent	Sunni
Zahrani	Adel Osseiran	عادل عسيران	Osseiran	Shiite
Nabatieh	Youssef al-Zein	يوسف الزين	Zein	Shiite
Jezzine - Maghdouche	Maroun Kanaan	مارون كنعان	Kanaan-Salem Alliance	Maronite
Jezzine - Maghdouche	Nikola Salem	نقولا سالم	Kanaan-Salem Alliance	Greek Catholic
Marjeyoun - Hasbaya	Kamel Asaad	كامل الاسعد	Asaad	Shiite
Tyre	Kazem al-Khalil	كاظم الخليل	Khalil	Shiite
Bint Jbeil	Ahmed Asaad	أحمد الأسعد	Asaad	Shiite
Zahle - East Bekaa	Joseph Skaff	جوزيف سكاف	Skaff-Hrawi Alliance	Greek Catholic
Zahle - East Bekaa	Georges al-Hrawi	جورج الهراوي	Skaff-Hrawi Alliance	Maronite
Rashaya - West Bekaa	Adeeb al-Farzli	أديب الفرزلي	Farzli-Qadri Alliance	Greek Orthodox
Rashaya - West Bekaa	Nazem Qadri	ناظم القادري	Farzli-Qadri Alliance	Sunni
Baalbek	Salim Haidar	سليم حيدر	Independent	Shiite
Hermel	Sabri Hamadeh	صبري حمادة	Constitutional	Shiite

Reelected Candidates:

- Movses Der Kalustyan (Beirut I)
- Ghassan Tueni (Beirut II)
- Abdallah El-Yafi (Beirut III)
- Abdullah al-Hajj (Beirut IV)
- Sami Solh (Beirut IV)
- Joseph Chader (Beirut V)
- Hashem al-Husseini (Tripoli I)
- Rashid Karami (Tripoli II)
- Nasouh Agha al-Fadel (Danniyeh)
- Hamid Frangieh (Zgharta)
- Bashir al-Uthman (Akkar)
- Kamal Jumblatt (Baakleen-Joun)
- Majid Arslan (Aley)
- Emile Bustani (Deir al Qamar)
- Bashir al-Awar (Baabda)
- Pierre Eddé (Baabda)
- Emile Lahoud (Matn)
- Dikran Tosbat (Burj Hammoud)
- Maroun Kanaan (Jezzine-Maghdouche)
- Nikola Salem (Jezzine-Maghdouche)
- Ahmed Asaad (Bint Jbeil)
- Nazem Qadri (Rashaya-West Bekaa)
- Sabri Hamadeh (Hermel)

== Electoral districts ==
=== Bourj Hammoud ===
The incumbent parliamentarian Dikran Tosbath, who had won his seat in the 1951 parliamentary election as an anti-Tashnag candidate, sought re-election. He was a close associate of President Camille Chamoun. As the Tashnag Party prioritized good relations with the government they threw their support behind Tosbath. Tosbath was also supported by the National Bloc. The Hunchag-Ramgavar-Independent Group alliance opted not to contest the Bourj Hammoud seat, concentrating their efforts in the Beirut I – Medawar seat instead. Hoping to benefit from the absence of other opposition candidates in Bourj Hammoud, the Lebanese Communist Party fielded Artin Madoyan.

4,696 out of the 15,895 registered voters (29.54%) cast their ballots on July 12, 1953. The electoral participation in Bourj Hammoud was the lowest in all of the Mount Lebanon Governorate. Tosbath won the election by a wide margin, obtaining 3,929 votes (83.67%) against 709 votes (15.11%) for Madoyan.

=== Bint Jbeil ===
The Bint Jbeil electoral district was created in 1953, as a single-member constituency. In the 1953 parliamentary election the seat was won by Ahmad al-As'ad, a powerful Shia landlord. His main opponent in the election had been the nationalist candidate Ali Bazzi.

=== Beirut V - Minet el Hosn ===
Beirut V - Minet el Hosn covered three neighbourhoods (quartiers) of the capital Beirut; Minet El Hosn, Dar Mreisse and Port and was attributed to a single Christian Minority seat. The district elected a single parliamentarian, belonging to Minorities. The district had 13,890 registered voters. The contenders for the Beirut V seat were Joseph Chader, Edmond Rabbath, Farid Jubran, Chafic Nassif and Jemil Attié. The Falangist Joseph Chader won with 2,081 votes and obtained the only seat for the Kataeb Party.
