= Artin Madoyan =

Artin Madoyan (Armenian: Արթին Մադոյան) (born 10 April 1904 in Adana) was a Lebanese-Armenian communist politician. He was the most prominent Armenian leader of the Lebanese Communist Party. He was seen as the 'right hand' of Syrian communist leader Khalid Bakdash.

== Youth ==
Madoyan was the son of a refugee shoe-maker from Adana. In his youth Madoyan was a Huntchag, but later became a communist. He studied in Istanbul and was a member of the Huntchag Social Democratic Students Union. Madoyan befriended Bedik Torossian, who later became a leader of the Armenian Communist Party.

== Spartak and foundation of the Communist Party ==
In the summer of 1922 Madoyan moved to Beirut, where his family had sought refuge. In 1922 the Huntchag Social Democratic Students Union set up a branch in Beirut with Madoyan as its secretary. In 1923 the Huntchag Students Union branch was dissolved as Madoyan and Haykazun Boyadian founded the Armenian communist organization Spartak Youth. The organization maintained links with the Armenian Communist Party and the French Communist Party. It consisted of workers and students and had some fifteen members in Beirut as well as cells in Aleppo, Alexandretta, Mosul and Zahle. Madoyan was the general secretary of Spartak. In 1925 Spartak merged with the Lebanese People's Party, forming the Syrian-Lebanese Communist Party. Madoyan was one of the six members of the first Central Committee of the party. At the time Madoyan was a medical student at Université Saint-Joseph.

== Underground work ==
Madoyan established links with Sultan al-Atrash and cooperated in arms smuggling between Beirut and Jebel Druze during the 1925-1927 Syrian revolt. Madoyan and Lebanese Yusuf Yazbek were arrested by French mandatory authorities in 1926. They were both imprisoned on the Arwad island, Syria, until 1928.

When the Central Committee was re-organized in 1928, Madoyan remained a member of it. In 1931 Madoyan introduced Khalid Bakdash to the Central Committee, Bakdash soon thereafter became general secretary of the party. Bakdash stayed in Moscow from December 1933 to 1937, he became the permanent representative of the Arab communist parties to the Communist International (Comintern) in 1934 on Madoyan's suggestion. In Bakdash's absence, Madoyan ran the day-to-day affairs of the party along with Farajallah el-Helou and Nicola Shawi. Madoyan proposed towards Comintern the formation of a federation of Arab communist parties with a common leadership, but this idea was not approved by the Comintern leadership due to security concerns.

== 1934 election ==
Madoyan contested the Beirut Armenian Orthodox seat in the 1934 Lebanese parliamentary election. He stood on the same list as Saadeddine Moumne (also a Communist Party member) and Ibrahim Haddad. Their campaign called for a worker-peasant alliance to achieve national independence, land reform, democratic freedoms and labour rights. Madoyan obtained 565 votes in the first round, 264 of them from the Medawar neighbourhood. In the second round, he obtained 180 votes.

== Interim party leader ==
Under Madoyan's leadership the party developed a role in the nascent labour movement and as well as becoming an important actor in the 1936 Syrian revolt. In February 1938 the Armenian communist weekly Joghovourti Tsayn ('Voice of the People') was founded with Madoyan as its editor.

== 1943 election ==
In June 1943, the Communist Party presented Madoyan as its candidate for the Beirut Armenian Orthodox seat in the 1943 parliamentary election. However, on 27 August 1943 Madoyan's candidature was withdrawn.

== Joint Secretariat ==
The Syrian-Lebanese Communist Party was divided into separate Lebanese and Syrian parties in 1944 (albeit still in a union of sorts). However, in August 1950 the decision to split the parties was reversed, with the formation of a joint secretariat for both Syria and Lebanon. The secretariat consisted of Bakdash, Madoyan and Hasan Qraytim.

== 1951 election ==
Ahead of the 1951 parliamentary election, Madoyan was again fielded as a candidate for a Beirut Armenian Orthodox seat. He obtained 2,765 votes (12.6% of the cast votes in Beirut).

== 1953 election ==
In the 1953 parliamentary election the Ramgavar-Huntchag-Independent Group bloc had opted not to field any candidate of their own for the Bourj Hammoud electoral district Armenian Orthodox seat. The Communist Party sought to take advantage of this situation by fielding Madoyan there. In his memoirs, Madoyan later stated that the Communist Party had proposed his candidature against his will. A day before the election, police arrested twenty-five of Madoyan's campaigners in Bourj Hammoud. Madoyan lodged a protest at the Ministry of Justice against the arrests. Madoyan, the sole contender against the incumbent Dikran Tosbath, obtained 709 votes (15.11%).

In 1954 Madoyan along with Qraitim, al-Hulo and Shawi signed a party statement. As the party was banned at the time, the Lebanese government charged Madoyan and the other signatories under martial law. They were given 1-month prison sentences in absentia.

== 20th Soviet party congress ==
In 1956 Madoyan attended the 20th congress of the Communist Party of the Soviet Union along with Bakdash, Shawi and Yusuf Faisal.

== 1963 jail sentence ==
In 1963 Madoyan was sentenced to one year in jail for having spoken in defence of the Communist Party.

== Civil War ==
During the Lebanese Civil War Madoyan represented the Lebanese Communist Party at the meetings of Armenian political parties, along with Barouyr Yeretsian and Garnik Addarian.

== Autobiography ==
Madoyan's autobiography was 'A Life on the Barricade: Memories and Testimonies' was published in Arabic in 1986 (Hayat 'ala al-Mitras: dhikrayat wa-mushahadat) and in Armenian in 1988 (Gyank me badneshi vra: husher yev vgaiutiunner).
