= Chafic Nassif =

Syriac Catholic Lebanese politician and lawyer

Chafic Nassif (Arabic: شفيق ناصيف) was a Syriac Catholic Lebanese politician and lawyer.

Nassif was one of the founders of the Kataeb Party in 1936. He won the Beirut Minorities seat in the 1937 parliamentary election. He later left the Kataeb Party and became a follower of Camille Chamoun.

Nassif contested the Beirut V - Minet El Hosn seat (allocated to Minorities) in the 1953 general election. He finished in third place with 1,097 votes (21.6%).

He re-entered parliament after the 1957 elections, winning the Minorities seat in the second district of Beirut with 14,471 votes. In 1958 he took part in founding the National Liberal Party and was a member of its Administrative Council.
