= 1968 Lebanese general election in Beirut I =

Lebanese general election, 1968 in Beirut I
March 24, 1968
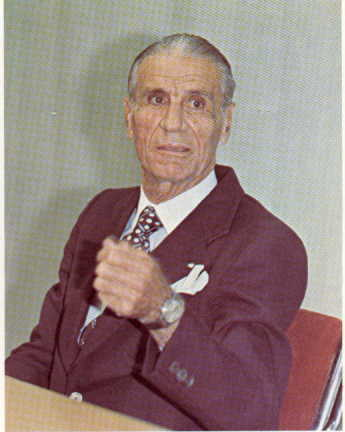

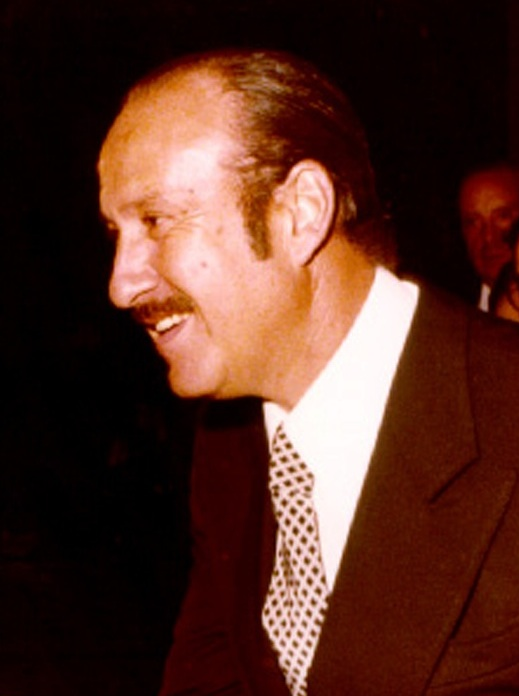
	First party	Second party	Third party
Leader	Pierre Gemayel	Movses Der Kaloustian	Michel Georges Sassine
Party	Kataeb	ARF	Independent
Seats after	3	3	2

Voting to elect eight members of the Lebanese parliament took place in the Beirut I district (one of three electoral districts in the city) on March 24, 1968, part of the national general election of that year. The constituency had 98,439 eligible voters, out of whom 28,631 voted (29.59 percent, the lowest turn-out of all constituencies). The elections in Beirut I passed smoothly without violent incidents.

In Beirut I, which comprised the Christian parts of the city, had 3 Armenian Orthodox seats, 1 Armenian Catholic seat, 1 Greek Catholic seat, 1 Greek Orthodox seat, 1 Maronite seat and 1 Protestant seat (for more information about the Lebanese election system, see Elections in Lebanon).

Two tickets competed against each other in the Beirut I constituency. One list was headed by the Kataeb Party chairman Pierre Gemayel and the other was head by Michel Georges Sassine. There were also four candidates outside of the two tickets.

The Gemayel ticket won six of the eight seats, whilst the Sassine ticket won two. The Kataeb Party ran a sophisticated and well-organized election campaign. However considering that Beirut I was a stronghold of the Kataeb, it had been expected that Gemayel's candidates won win all the seats up for grabs. Instead two sitting parliamentarians on the Gemayel ticket were defeated. Possibly the fact that Armenian candidates were elected unopposed led to lower participation from Armenian voters (whose Armenian Revolutionary Federation was an ally of Kataeb), weakening the position of the Gemayel ticket.

== Armenian Orthodox seats ==
Gemayel's ticket had three Armenian Orthodox candidates, all of them were elected unopposed. The three were affiliated to the Armenian Revolutionary Federation and were all incumbent parliamentarians; the 72-year-old Movses Der Kaloustian (the oldest parliamentarian in Lebanon at the time), Khatchig Babikian (lawyer and former minister) and Souren Khanamirian (businessman).

== Armenian Catholic seat ==
Joseph Chader was elected unopposed in the Armenian Catholic seat. A lawyer by profession, Chader was member of parliament since 1951 and vice chairman of the Kataeb Party. He contested the election as a candidate on the Gemayel ticket.

== Greek Catholic seat ==
The Greek Catholic seat saw a clash between Antoine Sahnawi from the Gemayel ticket, Nasri Maalouf from the Sassine ticket and the independent candidate Sami Zuryaq. The prominent businessman Sahnawi, an incumbent parliamentarian since 1960 and former Minister of Post Office, was a member of the Democratic Front. Nasri Maalouf was a lawyer and journalist, and had previously served as parliamentarian and minister. He was technically an independent, but closely linked to the National Liberal Party. Nasri Maalouf obtained 14,087 votes, Antoine Sahnawi 12,485 votes and Sami Zurayq 226 votes.

== Greek Orthodox seat ==
In the Greek Orthodox seat Michel Georges Sassine confronted Fu'ad Butrus (an independent politician, lawyer by profession, incumbent parliamentarian and former minister contesting on the Gemayel ticket) and Joseph Lahoud of the National Liberal Party. Sassine was a prominent businessman who had tried to run for parliament in 1960. He was not affiliated with any political party. Sassine obtained 14,821 votes against 13,744 for Butrus and 1,116 for Lahoud.

== Maronite seat ==
The Sassine ticket had no Maronite candidate. However, the reign of the Kataeb strongman Pierre Gemayel was challenged by independent candidate Salim Wakim. Wakim, 35 years old, had tried to contest the 1964 elections as well but had only mustered nine votes at the time. This time Pierre Gemayel received 24,835 votes against 1,344 votes for Salim Wakim.

== Protestant seat ==
The candidate of the Gemayel ticket for the Protestant seat was the Kataeb Party member Samir Ishaq; a young businessman and American University of Beirut graduate. An unknown name in politics, Ishaq had been nominated by the Political Bureau of the Kataeb Party just five weeks before the election.

Sassine's Protestant candidate was Charles Sa'ad; 66 years old and parliamentarian since 1960. Sa'ad was a member of the Democratic Front. A third Protestant candidate was Yetvart Lushkhajian, an Armenian Protestant businessman vying for public office for the first time. Ishaq obtained 15,997 votes, followed by 11,302 for Sa'ad and 664 for Lushkhajian.
