= Bourj Hammoud electoral district =

Bourj Hammoud
- Former constituency for the Parliament of Lebanon
- Governorate: Mount Lebanon

Former constituency
- Created: 1952
- Abolished: 1957
- Number of members: 1 (Armenian Orthodox)
- MP: Dikran Tosbath (1953-1957)

The Bourj Hammoud electoral district (Arabic: دائرة برج حمود) or the Eight Constituency was an electoral district in Lebanon, used in the 1953 parliamentary election. The district elected a single Armenian Orthodox parliamentarian.

== New election law ==
The 1953 election was the first parliamentary election in Lebanon with a new electoral system which allowed candidates to win with a plurality of votes, rather than requiring a second round. Female universal suffrage was introduced whilst voting was made compulsory for men, as per the November 1952 Election Law. Moreover, the number of seats in the parliament was reduced from 77 to 44. Most of the electoral districts now elected only a single parliamentarian, rather than the usual system in Lebanon where several parliamentarians are elected from a larger district. The Eighth Constituency, Bourj Hammoud, was assigned one of the two Armenian Orthodox seats in the election (the other Armenian Orthodox seat was assigned to the Beirut I – Medawar electoral district). It was one of nine constituencies in the Mount Lebanon Governorate.

== Candidates ==
The incumbent parliamentarian Dikran Tosbath, who had won his seat in the 1951 parliamentary election as an anti-Tashnag candidate, sought re-election. He was a close associate of President Camille Chamoun. As the Tashnag Party prioritized good relations with the government they threw their support behind Tosbath. Tosbath was also supported by the National Bloc. The Hunchag-Ramgavar-Independent Group alliance opted not to contest the Bourj Hammoud seat, concentrating their efforts in the Beirut I – Medawar seat instead. Hoping to benefit from the absence of other opposition candidates in Bourj Hammoud, the Lebanese Communist Party fielded Artin Madoyan.

== Voting ==
4,696 out of the 15,895 registered voters (29.54%) cast their ballots on 12 July 1953. The electoral participation in Bourj Hammoud was the lowest in all of the Mount Lebanon Governorate. Tosbath won the election by a wide margin, obtaining 3,929 votes (83.67%) against 709 votes (15.11%) for Madoyan.
