= Armenian Revolutionary Federation in Lebanon =

Armenian Revolutionary Federation Հայ Յեղափոխական Դաշնակցութիւն
- Abbreviation: ARF, ՀՅԴ
- Secretary-General: Albert Balabanian
- Spokesperson: Hagop Pakradouni
- Founded: 1890 Tiflis, Russian Empire
- Headquarters: Beirut
- Newspaper: Aztag Daily
- Youth wing: Armenian Youth Federation
- Ideology: Armenian nationalism United Armenia; Democratic socialism
- Political position: Left-wing
- National affiliation: March 8 Alliance
- International affiliation: Armenian Revolutionary Federation; Socialist International
- Colors: Red
- Parliament of Lebanon: 2 / 128
- Cabinet of Lebanon: 1 / 24

Party flag

Website
- www.arfd.info

The Armenian Revolutionary Federation (ARF; Armenian: Հայ Յեղափոխական Դաշնակցութիւն (ՀՅԴ), romanized: Hay Heghapokhagan Tashnagtsutiun; Arabic: الإتحاد الثوري الأرمني - الطاشناق, romanized: Al-Ittihad Al-Thawri Al-Armani - Al-Tashnaq), also known simply as Tashnag, is an Armenian political party active in Lebanon since the 1920s as an official political party in the country after having started with small student cells in the late 1890s and early 20th century.

The party is considered to have the biggest political support in the Lebanese Armenian community.

== History ==
The Armenian Revolutionary Federation was founded in Tiflis (Tbilisi in modern-day Georgia) in 1890 by Christapor Mikaelian, Stepan Zorian, and Simon Zavarian.

The party operates in Armenia and in countries where the Armenian diaspora is present, notably in Lebanon where the Armenian Revolutionary Federation is considered the strongest political party within the Lebanese-Armenian community. The party adheres to socialism and is part of the Socialist International.

== 19th century until 1918 ==
The party became initially active in Lebanon during the Ottoman Empire (end of 19th century and end of World War I) through Armenian students registered to study in Beirut colleges and universities during the Ottoman rule in Lebanon.

== 1920s to 1950s ==
The party also gained many members with the increasing waves of Armenian immigrants flooding into Lebanon in the early 1920s fleeing the Armenian genocide during World War I.

From 1923 to 1958, conflicts erupted among the three traditional Armenian political parties, the Tashnags (Armenian Revolutionary Federation), the Hunchaks (Social Democrat Hunchakian Party) and the Ramgavars (Armenian Democratic Liberal Party) struggling to dominate and organize the diaspora.

The party had media presence very early on with the short-lived "Pyunig" newspaper (Arabic: Փիւնիկ) published in Beirut in general reflecting the views of the party. The Aztag daily (Arabic: Ազդակ) replaced Pyunig and started publication on March 5, 1927, in Beirut, Lebanon. It is the official party organ of the Armenian Revolutionary Federation's Lebanese Central Committee and considered one of the biggest dailies of the Armenian diaspora.

== Civil strife 1956–1958 ==
After the death of Catholicos of the Holy See of Cilicia Karekin I in 1952, the seat in Antelias remained vacant for nearly four years. In 1956, Archbishop Zareh Payaslian was consecrated Catholicos of Cilicia as Zareh I despite the opposition of Catholicos of Echmiadzin of All Armenians Catholicos Vazgen I who refused to recognize his authority considering Zareh I's choice as partisan. This controversy greatly polarized the Armenian community of Lebanon. The regime of the Lebanese President Camille Chamoun in support of Zareh I served to polarize the situation further.

With failure of all mediation, and in the context of the Lebanese civil strife of 1958, an armed conflict erupted within the Lebanese community as well, between supporters of Catholicos Zareh I (mainly adhering to the Armenian Revolutionary Federation) and the opponents of Zareh I mainly adhering to the Social Democrat Hunchakian Party (Hunchakians) and Armenian Democratic Liberal Party (Ramgavars), with the two latter parties supporting the positions of the Catholicos of All Armenians Vazgen I and the Mother See of Holy Etchmiadzin in Soviet Socialist Republic of Armenia.

The situation developed into armed confrontations and various shootings and killings between the different groups resulting in a big rift within the Armenian Apostolic Church in Lebanon and worldwide. The conflicts calmed down after 1958 with the establishment of the regime of President Fouad Chehab in Lebanon.

== 1960s to 1975 ==
Politically the party remained allied with the Phalangist Party of Pierre Gemayel and at a later stage with the Tripartite Alliance (Arabic: الحلف الثلاثي) made up of the Maronite Christian leaders Camille Chamoun, Pierre Gemayel and Raymond Edde.

The Armenian Revolutionary Federation generally ran joint election tickets with the Phalangists, especially in Beirut and Metn constituencies with large Armenian populations and reserved Armenian seats according to the confessional division of electoral districts. securing all Armenian Parliamentary seats in Beirut and the Metn in 1960, 1964, 1968 and 1972 parliamentary elections.

The official ARF party journal Droshak resumed publication in Beirut in 1969 and continued until 1985, when the party organ moved to Athens, Greece because of the security situation in Lebanon.

== 1975 Lebanese Civil War until 2000 ==
The ARF (Tashnag), along with most other Armenian groups, refused to take sides between the warring Lebanese factions or to play an active military role in the Lebanese Civil War, and declared what became known as "positive neutrality" (Arabic: الحياد الإيجابي; Arabic: Դրական Չէզոքութիւն) of the Armenians between the various Lebanese factions. This position was prompted by the ARF trying to avoid an inter-Armenian conflict after the 1956–1958 incidents. Thus the Armenian regions were somewhat spared from a devastating conflict, although they continued to suffer from shellings and various military conflicts in Nabaa, Karantina and the Syrian intervention.

But ARF and the general Armenian consensus neutral position and refusal to ally openly with the right-wing Christian forces soured the long-standing relations between the ARF and the Phalangist party, and more particularly the Lebanese Forces (a militia dominated by Phalangists and commanded by Bachir Gemayel, Pierre Gemayel's son). The Lebanese Forces responded by attacking the Armenian quarters of many Lebanese towns, including Bourj Hammoud. In addition, the statue dedicated to the Armenian genocide and located in Bikfaya was also targeted by a bombing by pro-Lebanese Forces elements.

Many Armenians affiliated with the ARF took up arms to defend their quarters. In an ensuing onslaught, the Lebanese Forces closed outposts of the party in various regions that had been created for keeping the peace in the predominantly Armenian regions during the Civil War. After things calmed down, mediations resulted in the ARF party continuing its control of the Armenian districts with a lower key operation and presence in agreement with Christian leadership of the country.

In the midst of the Lebanese civil war, and in a surge of retaliation against Turkish targets worldwide led by the Armenian Secret Army for the Liberation of Armenia (ASALA), another guerrilla organization called Justice Commandos Against Armenian Genocide (JCAG) emerged and carried out a string of its own assassinations and operations from 1975 to 1983. The guerrilla organization has sometimes been linked to the Tashnags.

== 21st century ==
Ethnic Armenians are allocated six seats in Lebanon's 128-member National Assembly. The Lebanese branch of the ARF has usually controlled a majority of the Armenian vote and won most of the ethnic Armenian seats in the National Assembly,

A major change however occurred in the parliamentary election of 2000. Negotiations to form a joint ticket between the ARF and the Karama (Dignity) party of Rafik Hariri broke down over Hariri's insistence that all candidates elected on his list, including ARF candidates, would have to form subsequently a unified parliamentary block—a rarity in Lebanese politics. This would effectively make the Armenian vote in the Chamber subservient to Hariri's wishes and practically dissolve "The Armenian Bloc" in the Lebanese Parliament. In addition, Hariri refused the ARF proposal to choose an Armenian candidate for the sole seat allocated to Lebanon's Evangelical community (many of whom are ethnically Armenian), insisting that the seat should go to an ally of his. The ARF decided to go it alone, although the other Armenian parties, namely Social Democrat Hunchakian Party (Hunchakians) and Armenian Democratic Liberal Party (Ramgavars) joined Hariri's list. In an unprecedented sweep, the Dignity movement and its allies captured 13 of Beirut's 19 seats, and the ARF was left with only one parliamentary seat in the Metn district in alliance with Michel Murr, its worst result in many decades of Parliamentary representation. It was also the first time ever that the Huntchakian and Ramgavar parties gained seats in the Parliament.

In the 2005 elections, the ARF called for a boycott of the elections in Beirut, disturbed that the four seats normally reserved for Beirut's large Armenian community had again gone unopposed to Hariri's candidates and his Hunchakian and Ramgavar allies plus some independent Armenian candidates. The ARF held one seat through its MP Hagop Pakradounian from the Metn district that includes Bourj Hamoud heavily populated by Armenians.

The ARF has generally avoided entanglement in sensitive domestic issues, usually supporting whichever government has been in power. However, the ARF harshly criticized the Lebanese government's decision in 2006 to invite the deployment of Turkish troops as part of the multilateral United Nations Interim Force in Lebanon (UNIFIL) peacekeeping force.

On August 5, 2007, a by-election took place in the Metn district, to replace the slain anti-Syrian minister Pierre Gemayel, the ARF decided to support Camille Khoury, the candidate backed by opposition leader Michel Aoun's Free Patriotic Movement. Camille Khoury faced off against Phalangist leader Amine Gemayel and subsequently won the seat. Government supporters blamed Gemayel's loss on the Armenians. Amine Gemayel accused the ARF of cheating and called for the ballot in Bourj Hammoud to be cancelled. Gemayel said that he had fared better "among Christians" and accused the Dashnaktsutyun of trying to "impose its will on the people of Metn". Lebanese politician Gabriel Murr accused the ARF of rigging the vote as "they always do". Murr pointed out that Aoun didn't win the Maronite vote but that he had won the Armenian vote, which was included in the Metn district to manipulate the electoral results. Hagop Pakradounian, a leader of the ARF in Lebanon, and the Armenian Deputies Bloc asked for a public apology. Pakradounian and the Armenian Deputies Bloc condemned comments made by Amine Gemayel and Gabriel Murr over the Armenian community's support for the Free Patriotic Movement.

The current ARF Central Committee Chairperson in Lebanon is Mr. Hovig Mkhitarian. The ARF Lebanon branch is headquartered in Bourj Hammoud in the Shaghzoian Centre, along with the ARF Lebanon Central Committee's Aztag daily newspaper and "Voice of Van" 24-hour radio station.

After failure to come to a consensus with the Hariri camp, part of the March 14 Alliance, the Armenian Revolutionary Federation has decided to become officially part of the March 8 Alliance since its formation in 2005. March 8 Alliance is made up of the Free Patriotic Movement and "Change and Reform Bloc" (headed by Michel Aoun), by Amal Movement, Hezbollah and other smaller factions as well as the ARF. The March 8 Alliance formed the official opposition to the March 14 Alliance government headed by the Lebanese Prime Minister Fouad Siniora and consequently by Prime Minister Saad Hariri. ARF's position was in sharp contrast to Social Democrat Hunchakian Party (Hunchakians) and Armenian Democratic Liberal Party (Ramgavars) who remained part of the March 14 Alliance.

After six years in opposition (2005 until January 2011), and with the joining of the Progressive Socialist Party headed by Walid Jumblatt to the opposition March 8 Alliance, the latter attained the majority in January 2011 to form the next Lebanese government.

After protests from October 2019 onwards until January 2020, which aimed for a change in the political arena, Vartine Ohanian became the first Lebanese Minister of Armenian descent in the Government of Hassan Diab, after she was proposed by the ARF.

== General election summary ==
| Election year | # of overall votes | % of overall vote | # of overall seats won | +/– | Leader |
|---|---|---|---|---|---|
| 1943 | | | 1 / 55 | ▲1 | Movses Der Kaloustian |
| 1947 | | | 2 / 55 | ▲1 | Movses Der Kaloustian |
| 1951 | | | 2 / 77 | Steady | Movses Der Kaloustian |
| 1953 | | | 1 / 44 | ▼1 | Movses Der Kaloustian |
| 1957 | | | 2 / 66 | ▲1 | Movses Der Kaloustian |
| 1960 | | | 4 / 99 | ▲2 | Movses Der Kaloustian |
| 1964 | | | 4 / 99 | Steady | Movses Der Kaloustian |
| 1968 | | | 4 / 99 | Steady | Movses Der Kaloustian |
| 1972 | | | 5 / 99 | ▲1 | Melkon Eblighatian |
| 1992 | | | 5 / 128 | Steady | Chahe Barsoumian |
| 1996 | | | 5 / 128 | Steady | Sebouh Hovnanian |
| 2000 | | | 1 / 128 | ▼4 | Sebouh Hovnanian |
| 2005 | | | 1 / 128 | Steady | Hagop Pakradounian |
| 2009 | | | 2 / 128 | ▲1 | Hagop Pakradounian |
| 2018 | 13,726 | 0.78% | 3 / 128 | ▲1 | Hagop Pakradounian |
| 2022 | 12,499 | 0.69% | 3 / 128 | Steady | Hagop Pakradounian |

== See also ==
- Armenian Revolutionary Federation
