= Asmar Asmar =

Lebanese Assyrian physician and politician

Asmar Ibrahim Asmar (born 1930) is a Lebanese Assyrian physician and politician. He studied at the American University of Beirut, and did specialization in cardiology at the University of Montpellier in France in 1959.

Asmar won the Beirut Minorities seat in the 1992 parliamentary election. He was a candidate on the list of Selim Hoss. Asmar contested the 1996 parliamentary election as well, as a candidate on the list of Najah Wakim, but was not re-elected. As of 2005, he resided in Antelias.
