= National Bloc (Lebanon) =

Centre-right political party in Lebanon

National Bloc الكتلة الوطنية
- French name: Bloc National
- Abbreviation: NB
- Secretary-General: Michel Helou
- Founder: Émile Eddé
- Founded: 1943 (as parliamentary bloc); 1946; 80 years ago (as party)
- Headquarters: 291 Rue Gouraud, Beirut
- Ideology: Lebanese nationalism Liberalism; Secularism
- Political position: Centre to centre-right
- Colours: Blue
- Slogan: We strive for a Prosperous, Green and Fair Lebanon.
- Parliament of Lebanon: 0 / 128

Website
- nationalbloc.org

The National Bloc is a centre-right secular political party in Lebanon that was founded in 1943 as a parliamentary bloc for the 1943 Lebanese elections by Émile Eddé but was later formed as a political party in 1946.

== History ==
The Lebanese National Bloc party is a social liberal, democratic and secular party based on the principles of the Human Rights Charter. The party endeavors to strengthen Lebanon's entity, preserve its sovereignty and independence along with its distinctive role in the neighboring countries and the whole world. It also seeks to lay the foundations and promote the rule of law, social justice, public and private freedoms, and the well-being of the country's citizens.

The party was founded by Émile Eddé in 1946. Following his death, his son, Raymond Eddé, was elected as his successor in 1949. The party represented the main political force in Lebanon in the 1940s and 1950s along with the "Constitutional Bloc" led by President Bechara El Khoury.

The bloc had great achievements at all levels, in particular at the legislative and sovereign levels: before the foundation of the party, President Émile Eddé refused the establishment of the Israel on July 25, 1944, and at the proposal of MP George Akl, the bloc urged the parliament to take a historical decision to "reject and denounce any attempt to establish a Zionist national homeland in Palestine ...".

One of the most prominent legislation that stuck to the name of the bloc is the Civil Marriage Draft Law of 1953, the Illicit Enrichment Law of 1953, and the Bank Secrecy Act of 1956. In 1958, the party refused to be involved in the civil conflict between the Lebanese people. Subsequently, it stood firmly against the military intervention in politics, and strongly opposed the Cairo Agreement reached on November 3, 1969, thus rejecting the establishment of a State within a State and the launching of the Palestinian armed struggle in southern Lebanon ..., knowing that its support for the just Palestinian cause in the land of Palestine remained unabated based on the Palestinian people's right to regain their land.

On February 12, 1976, the National Bloc refused to participate in the Lebanese war, and Raymond Eddé made this announcement during a press conference. He also strongly opposed the entry of Syrian military forces into the Lebanese territories. He firmly stood against the Israeli invasion in March 1978 and 1982 and contributed to holding contacts and mobilizing the international public opinion until the UN Security Council issued the two resolutions 425 and 426. Throughout the Israeli occupation period, the party had been a supporter of the national resistance actions in southern Lebanon as it is a right guaranteed by the laws.

The party declined to take part in the Taif Agreement on several grounds relating to the form and content, all affecting Lebanon's sovereignty. It also opposed all agreements between Lebanon and Syria subsequent to the Taif Agreement given the lack of balance between the two countries^{1}. The party then abstained from participating in the parliamentary elections that were held amid the presence of the Israeli occupation in the south and the Syrian forces in all other Lebanese regions.

Following the death of President Raymond Eddé on May 10, 2000, Carlos Eddé was elected as the party's leader. He held on the same approach of his predecessor that backs sovereignty, refusing at first to run in the parliamentary elections while standing up to everything that compromises Lebanon's independence and sovereignty, especially the presence of Syrian forces on its soil, as well as the possession by the Lebanese and Palestinians of any weapons other than the solely legal ones, especially after the liberation of the south. In 2005, the party submitted two draft laws, the first being economic and the other one electoral based on the individual constituency. In 2019, after a period of waiting, the party re-launched its activity and introduced a major change to its system: the post of leader was abolished and the political inheritance in it ended definitely in an advanced and unprecedented move in the history of the Lebanese political work. Moreover, a new Executive Committee to which all of the leader's powers have been transferred was elected; it takes its decisions through consultation and with the majority of votes. This committee, in turn, elected the party's Secretary-General, Pierre Issa, who presides over it. The post of party's president was also created; the president shall be elected on the basis of rotation for a one-year period from among the members of the Executive Committee, and shall have a supervisory role over the party's work, steering it clear of deviation from the principles and foundations in all its cadres. A Senate of party veterans was also established as an advisory body that seeks to have the work carried out in accordance with the party's principles and constants. In addition, six lines of action and a general program have been developed based on new foundations, the main slogan of which is "a prosperous, green and just Lebanon".

In 2019, the party launched a campaign fighting extreme poverty in Lebanon. The party also made statements regarding the October 17 revolution.

== Party leadership ==
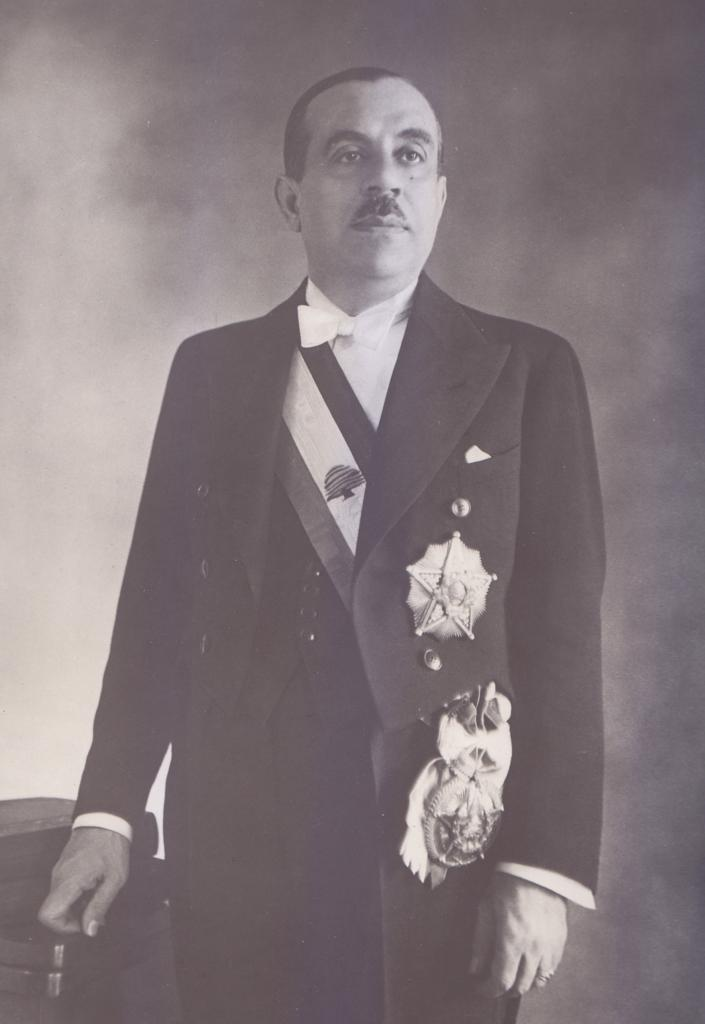
Official portrait of Émile Eddé

=== Émile Eddé ===
Émile Ibrahim Eddé was born in Damascus on May 24, 1884. He received his law degree with distinction from Aix-en-Provence University. He served his apprenticeship as a trainee lawyer at Professor Nicolas Chouchani's office and later established a law firm. He is a co-founder of the Lebanese Beirut Association that had been calling for the return of Lebanon's borders to their initial condition – prior to the Protocol of 1861 – as per the map laid down by the French military mission in 1861. In 1913, Eddé resorted to Alexandria with many intellectuals in the Levant as a result of persecution by the Turks. An arrest warrant had been issued against him and he was sentenced to death in absentia due to his political activity and for being the lawyer of the French consulate in Beirut.

He was elected as a member of the first Lebanese delegation to the Paris Peace Conference that was formed on October 9, 1918, and was also appointed to the third Lebanese delegation formed in January 1920 under the chairmanship of Bishop Abdullah Khoury. The workmanship he demonstrated enabled him to make historical achievements on the level of the Lebanese national entity. Eddé urged the board of directors in Mount Lebanon – on the eve of the second delegation's departure, headed by Patriarch Elias Hoayek – to issue a decision demanding the recovery of territories taken from Lebanon. Émile Eddé signed memoranda and petitions in the framework of his activity within the third delegation, and faced the French current calling for Syrian federalism after the Faisal - Clemenceau agreement and the Zionists’ demands in a meeting attended by the third delegation under the chairmanship of Archbishop Abdullah Khoury and Weizmann, saying that Zionism aims to annex southern Lebanon up to the Litani to Palestine, which is rejected by the Lebanese people.

Emile Eddé was elected President of the Lebanese Republic in 1936 and signed during his term the Franco-Lebanese Treaty which provides for granting Lebanon its independence 5 years after ratifying the same. Nonetheless, the French government refused to ratify it thereafter.

He also developed during his presidential term the currently prevailing practice of nominating a Muslim Sunni as Lebanese Prime Minister.

He ran in the elections of 1943 against the list of Sheikh Bechara El Khoury, and issued an electoral statement on August 9, 1943, which became as a program for the Lebanese National Bloc. It was summarized in several points, chief among which are Lebanon's full democratic independence, Lebanon's attachment to the United Nations’ cause (which will replace the League of Nations), closer friendly ties with fraternal countries on the basis of mutual respect and full sovereignty, respect for all religions, equality between the Lebanese in terms of civil and political rights, equitable representation in public office based on competency, reform of the State's public administration, dissemination and mainstreaming of education, development of agriculture, industry and trade, safeguarding the Lebanese expatriates’ interests, bringing together all the Lebanese regardless of their different sects in a united nation – the Lebanese homeland. During that period, incidents succeeded each other and dangers exacerbated, rendering it necessary for Émile Eddé to establish a party that takes charge of defending Lebanon and conveying his ideas. Therefore, three deputies from his bloc: Amin Al Saad, Asaad Al Bustani and George Akl filed, on May 15, 1946, an application in order to be duly provided with a statement of notification from the Minister of Interior, and on the same day, they received the Minister of Interior's approval under No. 7582. Hence, the Lebanese National Bloc party was officially founded and was based on a program and an internal system. After that, Kesrouan El Khazen was elected President of the Party.

In 1949, Raymond Eddé was elected leader of the Party following the death of his father, Emile Eddé, and he remained in office until he died in 2000.

=== Raymond Eddé ===
Raymond Eddé was born in Alexandria on March 15, 1913. He received his elementary and secondary studies at the Jesuit Fathers School in Alexandria and grew up in his uncles’ house in Egypt. He returned to Lebanon in 1931, then enrolled in Saint Joseph University in Beirut, and graduated with a law degree in 1934. He served his apprenticeship as a trainee lawyer at his father's office until 1936, and practiced law at the same office after his father was elected President of the Republic.

He was elected Member of Parliament for the first time in 1953 for "the country of" Byblos, and was re-elected in 1957 and 1960. He did not make it in the 1964 elections but won in the 1965 Byblos by-elections as the seat became vacant following Dr. Antoine Said's death. He was elected again in 1968.

In 1958, Raymond Eddé did not only refuse to be involved in the civil conflict that flared up between the Lebanese people, but contributed to eliminating the effects that ensued and restoring security and order in his capacity as Minister of Interior, Labor, Social Affairs, Agriculture and Public Works under President Fuad Chehab's rule. It was the first time he entered the cabinet. Afterwards, and during that period, the party stood firmly against the military intervention in politics and strongly opposed the Cairo Agreement reached on November 3, 1969, thus rejecting the establishment of a State within a State as this agreement allowed for the launching of the Palestinian armed struggle in southern Lebanon in order to wage operations against Israel without an absolute Arab contribution or participation, knowing that its support for the Palestinian cause in the land of Palestine remained unabated even before the establishment of the Israel, as well as its support for their right to regain their land through all means, except for the ones that compromise Lebanon's sovereignty.

Leader Raymond Eddé warned against the “Cyprusization” of Lebanon, i.e. dividing it as it was the case in Cyprus and against its “Balkanization”, i.e. sowing discord amongst its sects, as happened in the Balkans. However, battles broke out between the Lebanese and the Palestinians on April 13, 1975 and turned through time into a civil war. The party refused, on February 12, 1976, to participate in the war, and made this announcement during a press conference held by Raymond Eddé. The party also strongly opposed the entry of Syrian military forces into the Lebanese territories. It stood firmly against the Israeli invasion in March 1978 and 1982 and contributed to holding contacts and mobilizing the international public opinion until the UN Security Council issued the two resolutions 425 and 426. Leader Eddé had considered these two decisions at that time as a personal battle that he fought, and he was decisive when he declared that Lebanon is the last Arab country to sign a peace agreement with Israel.

He was the target of several assassination attempts which prompted him to travel to France where he went into voluntary exile in 1977 and stayed until May 10, 2000, the date of his death.

The party refused to participate in the Taif Agreement for several grounds including the meeting of deputies outside the Lebanese territories, the document's ratification outside the parliament at the Qleiat military airport, and the absence of an explicit text in the document calling on the Syrian army to withdraw from the Lebanese territories. The party also opposed the derogation from the powers of the President of the Republic, considering that the Taif constitution lays on foundation of sectarianism in Lebanon and criticizing the agreement's content in terms of ambiguous texts and generalities that drag the country into divisions over the interpretation of the constitutional text. In addition, it opposed all agreements between Lebanon and Syria subsequent to the Taif Agreement given the lack of balance between the two countries. Afterwards, the party abstained from participating in the first parliamentary elections under the third Republic's rule in 1992 and in the ones that followed until the year 2000, the date of Eddé's death, a few days before the liberation of southern Lebanon. Raymond Eddé had always supported the actions of the national resistance in southern Lebanon as it is a right guaranteed by the laws. Throughout his stay in his Parisian exile, he kept on calling for the implementation of the international legitimacy and its Lebanon-related resolutions.

He died in Paris on May 10, 2000 and his body was transported to Beirut where a national funeral ceremony was held for him. Maronite Patriarch Mar Nasrallah Butros Sfeir presided over the mass following protocols confining this practice to the Presidents of the Republic. During the memorial service, Sfeir explained the reason behind Eddé's move, saying that Raymond Eddé would have reached the presidency had he accepted any compromise on his principles.

Decorations received by Raymond Eddé: The Egyptian Republic's Grand Cordon in 1959 and the Grand Officer Medal of the National Order of the Cedar (Lebanese) awarded posthumously in 2000.

=== Carlos Eddé ===
Following the death of leader Raymond Eddé in 2000, the party elected Carlos Eddé as its leader during a period that was a milestone in Lebanon's history. Hence, he pursued the path of the National Bloc and followed the latter's approach - in its foreign policy - to the position on Israel, the Palestinian cause and the relations with Syria. In this respect, he highlighted the need to demarcate the borders, to assert that the Shebaa Farms belong to Lebanon, and to re-examine the agreements that were signed with Syria during its presence and hegemony over Lebanon, as well as the need to release all Lebanese detainees there.

With regard to its domestic policy, the bloc continued to boycott parliamentary elections (held in 2000), and took part in the Cornet Chahwan gathering which opposed the extension of President Emile Lahoud's term in 2004. The bloc also participated in the March 14 uprising in 2005 which led to the withdrawal of the Syrian army from Lebanon late April of that year.

Subsequently, the bloc participated in the parliamentary elections held in 2005 and 2009, but they were unsuccessful attempts. It also objected to proposing the name of army commander Michel Suleiman for the presidential post as an initial position and in order to prevent the army from being permanently politicized. Nonetheless, the bloc approved, following Suleiman's election in 2008, the swearing-in speech and accepted to support what was stated therein.

While the March 14 forces accepted the Doha Agreement, the bloc expressed reservations because it adopts the 1960 electoral law which effectively prevents genuine elections from being held, and for laying the foundations of the "blocking third" concept in the cabinet. As the allied forces adopted the agreement and deviated from the bloc's constants, the latter left the March 14 coalition and adopted an independent policy.

The bloc submitted two draft laws in 2005, the first one being an electoral law drafted in detail with its rationale; it seeks to adopt the individual constituency as a basis for the general elections, and the second being a comprehensive economic law as part of the bloc's electoral program for that year.

=== Michel Helou ===
Michel Helou was elected the secretary-general of the National Bloc on 10 November 2022.

Michel Helou was born in Geneva in 1989 and raised in Switzerland and France after his family emigrated due to the civil war that broke out in Lebanon.

After obtaining his MBA from HEC Paris Business School in 2013, Michel joined Bain & Company Middle East in Dubai, a leading consulting firm.

In 2015, Michel Helou moved to Beirut to assume the position of Executive Director of the oldest Lebanese newspaper, L'Orient- Le Jour, which is characterized as being the most widely read and demanded newspaper in Lebanon and seeks to deliver news, social and economic developments, i.e. carrying out the journalistic message, to all community groups.

Helou worked for six years to restructure the content of the paper newspaper and prepare a new digital design with the aim of providing a better integrated experience for readers while preserving the independence of the editorial content and the integrity of this symbolic historical institution.

In October 2020, Helou announced the launch of the “L’Orient Today” news platform, and decided to go through an experiment that would increase openness and expand horizons in the English language, after nearly a hundred years of providing news in French.

In February 2019, Michel Helou participated in the relaunch of the "Lebanese National Bloc", a historic party that resumed its political activities with a talented young team seeking to change the current political landscape.

Michel Helou, was the candidate of the "National Bloc" in the parliamentary elections for the 2022 session, in the Baabda district and failed to get elected.

== Party structure ==
=== Party Council ===
The Party Council shall consist of thirty members, one third of whom shall be elected for a six-year term, according to a special system laid down by the Executive Committee thereafter. The Executive Committee shall subsequently appoint the other third of experts and specialists for the same period.

As part of its tasks, the Party Council:

- Discusses and approves the party's annual budget.
- Examines general issues and suggestions received.
- Supervises the work of the Executive Committee.
- Elects the Executive Committee members.
- Other tasks.

=== The Executive Committee ===
The party has an Executive Committee of at least six members, except for the Secretary-General. The Committee runs the party's internal affairs, develops plans for political action, implements the party's decisions, and refers to it the draft budget before the October regular session begins.

=== President of the party ===
As the post of leader was abolished and his powers were transferred to the Executive Committee, the post of President of the party has been created. The president of the party's main job is to have the party's system and general principles respected. The president of the party serves for a non-renewable, one-year term after being elected by the Executive Committee, on a rotation basis, from among its members. Currently, for the first year after the creation of the post, the party's President is Salam Yamout.

=== Senate ===
An advisory body, called the Senate, consisting of at least five partisan members, shall be created. The members shall be appointed and replaced for an indefinite period of time under a decision of the Executive Committee. The Senate issues opinions and recommendations to both the Party council and the Executive Committee.

=== Secretary-General ===
The party has a Secretary-General who handles administrative and political affairs and is considered a judicious member of the Executive Committee. The Secretary-General sets the agendas of the Executive Committee and the party's annual conference, and calls for their meetings.

The Secretary-General shall be appointed and dismissed under a decision of the Executive Committee by a two-thirds majority of the members who constitute it, and shall stay in office as long as the Executive Committee is in place. The party's incumbent Secretary-General is Pierre Issa.

== Electoral results ==
Election year	Votes	%	Seats	+/−	Leader
1943	25,924 (1st)	20.0	11 / 55	▲11	Émile Eddé
1947			0 / 55	▼11	Émile Eddé
1951			3 / 77	▲3	Raymond Eddé
1953			3 / 44	0	Raymond Eddé
1957			5 / 66	▲2	Raymond Eddé
1960			4 / 99	▼1	Raymond Eddé
1964			3 / 99	▼1	Raymond Eddé
1968			6 / 99	▲3	Raymond Eddé
1972			4 / 100	▼2	Raymond Eddé
1998			0 / 128	0	Edmond Chbeir
2000			2 / 128	▲2	Carlos Eddé
2005			0 / 128	0	Carlos Eddé
2009			0 / 128	0	Carlos Eddé
2018	Boycotted				Carlos Eddé
2022	11,016	0.61%	0 / 128	0	Salam Yamout

== Statements of National Bloc leaders ==
- "The problem with this Lebanese people – known for their ancient civilizations, smartness and hard-working trait – is that they always manage to stand up on their feet regardless of the situation you put them in, except in politics where they end up lying on their stomach before the leader who is also lying and crawling on his stomach before his own boss: the country’s enemy." – Raymond Eddé
- "One of my duties, as MP, is to discuss all these subjects and criticize everything I have been criticized for because my target – through this discussion and this criticism – is to serve the Lebanese people’s interest."
- "I have a clear conscience because I did not kill, betray or steal … and neither did my party. I did not also give orders to kill and steal."

== See also ==
- National Bloc politicians
- Émile Eddé
- Raymond Edde
- Constitution of Lebanon
