= Aztag =

Aztag Ազդակ
- Type: Daily newspaper
- Format: Print, online
- Founded: 5 March 1927; 98 years ago
- Political alignment: Armenian Revolutionary Federation
- Language: Western Armenian
- Headquarters: Beirut
- Website: www.aztagdaily.com

Aztag (Armenian: Ազդակ) is a daily newspaper and the official newspaper of the Armenian Revolutionary Federation (Tashnagtsoutioun) in Lebanon. The editor in chief is Shahan Kandaharian.

Aztag was started in 1927 and the first issue appeared on 5 March 1927 in Beirut, Lebanon. Also the following supplements of Aztag are published:

- "Bzdig-mzdig" (children supplement)
- "Navasart" (sports)
- "Anahid"
- "Aztag Kragan - Aztag Arvesdi" (literary / cultural)

The newspaper also runs an online service in Armenian and Arabic.
