= Mohammad Youssef Beydoun =

Lebanese politician (1931–2023)

Mohammad Youssef Beydoun (1931– 20 December 2023) was a Lebanese politician.

A Shia Muslim born in Beirut, into a family originally from Damascus. Beydoun was born in 1931 and attended the Lycée Français de Beyrouth before earning his law degree from Saint Joseph University in 1954. He was first elected a member of the Parliament of Lebanon in 1972 for Beirut II. The next general election was not held until 1992, after the Lebanese Civil War had ended. Beydoun was reelected that year, as well as in 1996. He stepped down from the parliament in 2000. During his parliamentary tenure, Beydoun served as oil and industry minister from 1980 to 1982, under Shafik Wazzan, was electricity and water minister between 1990 and 1992, in the Omar Karami government, and headed the ministries of culture and education (including higher education) between 1998 and 2000 when Salim Al-Huss was prime minister.

Beydoun died on 20 December 2023, at the age of 92.
