= Garnik Addarian =

Lebanese Communist Party politician

Garnik Hovsepi Addarian (in Armenian Գառնիկ Ադդարյան, also transliterated Karnig Attarian in Western Armenian) (1925–1986) was an Armenian Diasporan poet, writer and public figure, a member of Lebanese Communist Party Central Committee since 1980. He was born in Aleppo and died in Beirut.

He graduated from the French college of Aleppo and then moved to Beirut, where edited "Ejer kraganutian yev arvesdi" and "Azkayin mshaguyt" newspapers and contributed to Arabian periodicals. He was the author of numerous books including "Aprim-mernim" (Live-die, 1968), a poem collection, and "Sev yev garmir" (Black and Red, 1979) a story book.

No133 school in Yerevan is named after him.

== Sources ==
- Armenian Concise Encyclopedia, Ed. by acad. K. Khudaverdian, Yerevan, 1990, p. 43
