= Nabil de Freige =

Lebanese politician

Nabil de Freij (born August 31, 1955) is a Lebanese politician. He was born in Beirut.

- Minister of Administrative Development.
- Married to Mrs. Maya Robert Barakat with two children.
- Studied at Notre Dame College of Jamhour.
- A graduate of the Higher Institute of Commerce and Management – Paris (1975–1980).
- Member of the board of directors of the Agricultural Research Institute (1989–2000).
- Member of the board of directors of Alban Lebanon (Candia).
- Secretary of the Association to protect and improve the descendants of Arabian horses (1987–1998).
- President of the Association to protect and improve the descendants of Arabian Horses (since February 1998).
- Was elected as Member of Parliament for the first time on September 3, 2000 (seat of minorities).
- A member of the Finance and Budget Committee (since 2000).
- A member of the Agriculture and Tourism Committee (2000–2005).
- A member of the Francophone Parliamentary Committee (since 2000).
- A member of the Office of the General Assembly of the International Francophone Parliament (since 2003).
- Was elected as Member of Parliament for the second time on 29 May 2005 on the list of Prime Minister Rafic Hariri (seat of minorities).
- Chairman of the National, Trade and Industry and Economy Planning Committee (since July 18, 2005).
- Was elected as Member of Parliament for the third time on June 7, 2009 on the list of Future Movement (seat of minorities).
