= Abdallah Ishak =

Lebanese politician

Abdallah Ishak (Arabic: عبد الله إسحق) was a Lebanese Armenian Catholic politician. Ishak hailed from the pre-1915 Armenian diaspora in Lebanon. In 1929 he defeated Ayoub Tabet and was elected to the Lebanese Parliament from the Beirut Minorities seat with the support from Maronite and Armenian groups. He was the first Armenian parliamentarian in Lebanon.

Ishak contested elections again in 1934, standing on the list of Abdallah Yafi. With 5,148 votes he finished in the first place amongst the Minorities candidates in the first round of voting. But in the second round he was defeated by the pro-government candidate Ayoub Tabet. Official results gave Ishak 2,082 votes.
