= 1951 Lebanese general election =

- 15 April 1951 (first round); 22 April 1951 (second round)
Party	Leader	Seats	+/–
Constitutional Bloc	Bechara El Khoury	N/A	
Kataeb	Pierre Gemayel	3	+3
National Bloc	Raymond Eddé	2	+2
PSP	Kamal Jumblatt	3	
ARF		2	0
Independents	–	≤67	
This lists parties that won seats. See the complete results below.
Prime Minister before	Prime Minister after
Hussein Al Oweini; Pro-Constitutional Bloc	Abdallah El-Yafi; Pro-Constitutional Bloc

General elections were held in Lebanon on 15 April 1951, with a second round in some constituencies on 22 April. Independent candidates won the majority of seats. Voter turnout was 54.7%. The governing party, Constitutional Bloc, did not have a clear organization, so it is difficult to determine the number of its members who participated in this election. Nonetheless, the government backed three "Constutional" lists in Mount Lebanon and had 14 of their 22 candidates elected. Former Constitutionalist minister Camille Chamoun became an opposition candidate in an alliance with Kamal Jumblatt.

== Apportionment of seats over districts and communities ==
	tot.	Ma	GO	GC	AO	AC	Pr	Mi	Su	Sh	Dr
tot.	77	23	8	5	3	1	1	1	16	14	5
Beirut (1 el. district)	13	1	1	1	2	1	1	1	4	1	
Bekaa (1 el. district)	11	2	1	2					2	3	1
Mount L. 1: Baabda-Metn	9	5	1		1					1	1
Mount L. 2: Chouf-Aley	9	3	1	1					1		3
Mount L. 3: Kesrwan	5	4								1	
North 1: Tripoli	6		1						5		
North 2: Zghorta-Koura-Batroun	6	5	1								
North 3: Akkar	4	1	1						2		
South (1 el. district)	14	2	1	1					2	8	

== Results ==
Party	Votes	%	Seats	+/–
Constitutional Bloc			–	N/A
Kataeb Party			3	+3
Progressive Socialist Party			3	New
Armenian Revolutionary Federation			2	0
National Bloc			2	+2
Armenian Democratic Liberal Party			0	0
Independents			–	+21
Total			10	+22
Total votes	194,849	–		
Registered voters/turnout	355,902	54.75		
Source: Suleiman.

=== Elected members ===
List of elected members
Constituency	Elected member	Name in Arabic	List	Demographic
Beirut	Sami Solh	سامي الصلح	Solh	Sunni
Beirut	Abdallah El-Yafi	عبدالله اليافي	Solh	Sunni
Beirut	Saeb Salam	صائب سلام	Solh	Sunni
Beirut	Amin Beyhum	أمين بيهم	Solh	Sunni
Beirut	Rashid Baydoun	رشيد بيضون	Solh	Shiite
Beirut	Ramez Sarkis	رامز سركيس	Solh	Protestant
Beirut	Henri Pharaoun	هنري فرعون	Solh	Greek Catholic
Beirut	Charles Helou	شارل حلو	Solh	Maronite
Beirut	Musa de Freij	موسى دي فريج	Solh	Minorities
Beirut	Movses Ter-Kaloustyan (Note: Member of the Armenian Revolutionary Federation.)	موسيس دركالوستيان	Solh	Armenian Orthodox
Beirut	Melkon Hayrapetyan	ملكون هيرايديان	Solh	Armenian Orthodox
Beirut	Habib Abu Shahla	حبيب أبو شهلا	Solh	Greek Orthodox
Beirut	Joseph Chader (Note: Member of the Kataeb Party.)	جوزيف شادر	Solh	Armenian Catholic
North Lebanon I Tripoli	Rashid Karami	رشيد كرامي	Karami	Sunni
North Lebanon I Tripoli	Hashem Al-Husseini	هاشم الحسيني	Karami	Sunni
North Lebanon I Tripoli	Qabuli Zouk	قبولي الذوق	Karami	Sunni
North Lebanon I Tripoli	Saadi Al Munla	سعدي المنلا	Karami	Sunni
North Lebanon I Tripoli	Nasuh Al-Fadil	نصوح الفاضل	Karami	Sunni
North Lebanon I Tripoli	Fouad Al-Bart	فؤاد البرط	Karami	Greek Orthodox
North Lebanon II Zgharta - Batroun - Koura	Antoine Estefan	انطوان اسطفان	Karam-Estefan	Maronite
North Lebanon II Zgharta - Batroun - Koura	Camille Akl (Note: Member of the Party of the National Bloc.)	كميل عقل	Karam-Estefan	Maronite
North Lebanon II Zgharta - Batroun - Koura	Youssef Karam	يوسف كرم	Karam-Estefan	Maronite
North Lebanon II Zgharta - Batroun - Koura	Hamid Frangieh	حميد فرنجية	Frangieh	Maronite
North Lebanon II Zgharta - Batroun - Koura	Qabalan Issa Al-Khoury	قبلان عيسى الخوري	Frangieh	Maronite
North Lebanon II Zgharta - Batroun - Koura	Philippe Najib Boulos	فيليب بولس	Karam-Estefan	Greek Orthodox
North Lebanon III Akkar	Suleiman Al-Ali	سليمان العلي	Ali	Sunni
North Lebanon III Akkar	Bashir Al-Othman	بشير العثمان	Ali	Sunni
North Lebanon III Akkar	Yaqoub Al-Sarraf	يعقوب الصرّاف	Ali	Greek Orthodox
North Lebanon III Akkar	Albert Al-Hajj (Note: Member of the Kataeb Party. However, he was expelled soon after being elected.)	ألبير الحاج	Ali	Maronite
South Lebanon	Riad Al Solh (Note: Riad Solh's name was also on the opposition list, headed by Adel Osseiran and Bishop Boulos Al-Khoury, both lost the election.)	رياض الصلح	Asaad	Sunni
South Lebanon	Ahmed Asaad	أحمد الأسعد	Asaad	Shiite
South Lebanon	Muhammad Safieddine	محمّد صفي الدين	Asaad	Shiite
South Lebanon	Ali Badreddine	علي بدرالدين	Asaad	Shiite
South Lebanon	Muhammad Al-Fadl	محمّد الفضل	Asaad	Shiite
South Lebanon	Ali Bazzi	علي بزي	Asaad	Shiite
South Lebanon	Hussein Abdallah	حسين العبدالله	Asaad	Shiite
South Lebanon	Suleiman Arab	سليمان عرب	Asaad	Shiite
South Lebanon	Muhammad Ali Ghatimi	محمّد علي غطيمي	Asaad	Shiite
South Lebanon	Maroun Kanaan	مارون كنعان	Asaad	Maronite
South Lebanon	Rashad Azar	رشاد عازار	Asaad	Maronite
South Lebanon	Nikola Salem	نقولا سالم	Asaad	Greek Catholic
South Lebanon	Suhail Shehab	سهيل شهاب	Asaad	Sunni
South Lebanon	Elias Traboulsi	الياس طرابلسي	Asaad	Greek Orthodox
Beqaa	Sabri Hamadeh (Note: Member of the Constitutional Bloc.)	صبري حمادة	Hamadeh-Haidar	Shiite
Beqaa	Ibrahim Haidar	إبراهيم حيدر	Hamadeh-Haidar	Shiite
Beqaa	Fadlallah Hamadeh	فضل الله حمادة	Hamadeh-Haidar	Shiite
Beqaa	Nazem Qadri	ناظم القادري	Hamadeh-Haidar	Sunni
Beqaa	Rifaat Qazoun	رفعت قزعون	Hamadeh-Haidar	Sunni
Beqaa	Jean Skaff	جان سكاف	Hamadeh-Haidar	Greek Catholic
Beqaa	Habib Al-Mutran	حبيب المطران	Hamadeh-Haidar	Greek Catholic
Beqaa	Youssef Hrawi	يوسف الهراوي	Hamadeh-Haidar	Maronite
Beqaa	Shafiq Hanna Al-Daher	شفيق حنا الضاهر	Hamadeh-Haidar	Maronite
Beqaa	Salim Al-Daoud	سليم الداود	Hamadeh-Haidar	Druze
Beqaa	Iskander Sursock	اسكندر سرسق	Hamadeh-Haidar	Greek Orthodox
Mount Lebanon I Baabda - Matn	Emile Lahoud	اميل لحود	Constitutional	Maronite
Mount Lebanon I Baabda - Matn	Elias Al-Khoury	الياس الخوري	Constitutional	Maronite
Mount Lebanon I Baabda - Matn	Michel Doumit	ميشال ضومط	Constitutional	Maronite
Mount Lebanon I Baabda - Matn	Bashir Al-Awar	بشير الأعور	Constitutional	Druze
Mount Lebanon I Baabda - Matn	Fouad Al-Khoury	فؤاد الخوري	Constitutional	Greek Orthodox
Mount Lebanon I Baabda - Matn	Dikran Tosbat	ديكران توسباط	Opposition	Armenian Orthodox
Mount Lebanon I Baabda - Matn	Elia Abu Joudeh	ايليا أبو جودة	Opposition	Maronite
Mount Lebanon I Baabda - Matn	Abdallah Al-Hajj (Note: Member of the Progressive Socialist Party.)	عبدالله الحاج	Opposition	Shiite
Mount Lebanon I Baabda - Matn	Pierre Eddé (Note: Elected in a runoff against Pierre Gemayel, leader of the Kataeb Party and a candidate on the Opposition list. Kamal Jumblatt allegedly persuaded the Syrian Social Nationalist Party to support Eddé.)	بيار إده	National Bloc	Maronite
Mount Lebanon II Chouf - Aley	Emile Bustani	اميل البستاني	Chamoun-Jumblatt	Maronite
Mount Lebanon II Chouf - Aley	Camille Chamoun	كميل شمعون	Chamoun-Jumblatt	Maronite
Mount Lebanon II Chouf - Aley	Kamal Jumblatt (Note: Leader of the Progressive Socialist Party.)	كمال جنبلاط	Chamoun-Jumblatt	Druze
Mount Lebanon II Chouf - Aley	Anwar Al-Khatib	أنور الخطيب	Chamoun-Jumblatt	Sunni
Mount Lebanon II Chouf - Aley	Ghassan Tueni (Note: Former member of the Syrian Social Nationalist Party which he was still affiliated with until around 1958.)	غسّان التويني	Chamoun-Jumblatt	Greek Orthodox
Mount Lebanon II Chouf - Aley	Majid Arslan	مجيد أرسلان	Constitutional	Druze
Mount Lebanon II Chouf - Aley	Salim Al-Khoury	سليم الخوري	Constitutional	Maronite
Mount Lebanon II Chouf - Aley	Bahij Takieddine	بهيج تقي الدين	Constitutional	Druze
Mount Lebanon II Chouf - Aley	Philippe Takla	فيليب تقلا	Constitutional	Greek Catholic
Mount Lebanon III Keserwan	Salim Al-Khazen	سليم الخازن	Constitutional	Maronite
Mount Lebanon III Keserwan	George Zouein	جورج زوين	Constitutional	Maronite
Mount Lebanon III Keserwan	Raphael Lahoud	روفائيل لحود	Constitutional	Maronite
Mount Lebanon III Keserwan	George Karam	جورج كرم	Constitutional	Maronite
Mount Lebanon III Keserwan	Ahmed Al-Husseini	أحمد الحسيني	Constitutional	Shiite

== Results by Constituencies ==
All candidates that could be identified as being close to the Constitutional Bloc or President Bechara El-Khoury, whether they were actually members by 1951, are marked as "Pro-Constitutional Bloc" below. There were confirmed Constitutionalists at the time of the election, such as Sabri Hamadeh and Majid Arslan, though the latter of which resigned from the bloc soon after the election.

=== Beirut ===
A list headed by the former Prime Minister during the mandate era, Sami Solh, won in its entirety. Although the list had a pro-government nature, after being appointed Prime Minister on 11 February 1952, Sami turned against the President, citing the Constitutional Bloc to be "men with authority hold power without being accountable and they interfere in all the affairs of the State".

- Voters: 57652
- Total Votes: 21988
- Turnout: 38.14%

Sunni
Candidates		List	Party Affiliation	Votes	% of total votes	Elected?
Sami Solh	سامي الصلح	Solh	Pro-Constitutional Bloc	14752	67.09%	Yes
Abdallah El-Yafi	عبدالله اليافي	Solh	Pro-Constitutional Bloc	14629	66.53%	Yes
Saeb Salam	صائب سلام	Solh	Pro-Constitutional Bloc	12808	58.25%	Yes
Amin Beyhum	أمين بيهم	Solh	Unclear	12175	55.37%	Yes
Muhammad Al-Jarawi	محمّد الجاروي	Popular	Unclear	7171	32.61%	No
Muhyiddin Al-Nsouli	محيي الدين النصولي	Popular	Unclear	6584	29.94%	No
Hussein Sejaan	حسين سجعان	Popular	Unclear	4073	18.52%	No
Takieddin el-Solh	تقي الدين الصلح	Popular	National Call Party	3348	15.36%	No
Mustafa Al-Wais	مصطفى الويس	-	Unclear	5502	25.02%	No
Wafiq Tabbara	وفيق طبارة	-	Unclear	1653	7.52%	No

Shiite
Candidates		List	Party Affiliation	Votes	% of total votes	Elected?
Rashid Baydoun	رشيد بيضون	Solh	Pro-Constitutional Bloc	14779	67.21%	Yes
Zahir Osseiran	زهير عسيران	Popular	National Call Party	6538	29.73%	No

Protestant
Candidates		List	Party Affiliation	Votes	% of total votes	Elected?
Ramez Sarkis	رامز سركيس	Solh	Unclear	14775	67.20%	Yes
Anis Hanikati	أنيس هنيكاتي	Popular	Unclear	5380	24.47%	No

Greek Catholic
Candidates		List	Party Affiliation	Votes	% of total votes	Elected?
Henri Pharaoun	هنري فرعون	Solh	Pro-Constitutional Bloc	13284	60.41%	Yes
Nasri Maalouf	نصري المعلوف	Popular	Chamoun affiliates	7411	33.70%	No

Maronite
Candidates		List	Party Affiliation	Votes	% of total votes	Elected?
Charles Helou	شارل حلو	Solh	Pro-Constitutional Bloc	13180	59.94%	Yes
Jean Jalakh	جان جلخ	Popular	Unclear	3789	17.23%	No
Raif Abi Al-Lamaa	رئيف أبو اللمع	-	Independent	3930	17.87%	No

Minorities
Candidates		List	Party Affiliation	Votes	% of total votes	Elected?
Musa de Freij	موسى دي فريج	Solh	Pro-Constitutional Bloc	12747	57.97%	Yes
Benoît Abu Sawan	بنوا أبو صوان	Popular	Unclear	6634	30.40%	No
Elie Khayat	ايلي خياط	-	Unclear	2257	10.26%	No

Armenian Orthodox
Candidates		List	Party Affiliation	Votes	% of total votes	Elected?
Movses Ter-Kaloustyan	موسيس دركالوستيان	Solh	Tashnag	12004	54.59%	Yes
Melkon Hayrapetyan	ملكون هيرايديان	Solh	Tashnag	11946	54.33%	Yes
Edward Barsoum	أدوار برصوم	Popular	Unclear	5888	26.78%	No
Hrach Sharakyan	هراتش شراكيان	Popular	Unclear	6583	29.94%	No
Artin Madoyan	ارتين مادويان	-	Lebanese Communist Party	2765	12.58%	No
Grigor Khachatryan	كريكور خاتشاريان	-	Unclear	1099	5.00%	No

Greek Orthodox
Candidates		List	Party Affiliation	Votes	% of total votes	Elected?
Habib Abu Shahla	حبيب أبو شهلا	Solh	National Call Party	11016	50.10%	Yes
Naseem Majdalani	نصري المعلوف	Popular	Progressive Socialist Party	10333	46.99%	No

Armenian Catholic
Candidates		List	Party Affiliation	Votes	% of total votes	Elected?
Joseph Chader	جوزيف شادر	Solh	Kataeb Party	9660	43.93%	Yes
Nubar Tor Sargsyan	نوبار طور سركسيان	Popular	Unclear	6987	31.78%	No
Tigran Shadarifyan	ديكران شادرفيان	-	Unclear	231	1.05%	No

=== North Lebanon I ===
Here, Rashid Karami made his debut in the parliamentary life of Lebanon. From then on, he would win every parliamentary election and sit in the parliament until his death in 1976. His list won in its entirety.

- Voters: 23676
- Total Votes: 13820
- Turnout: 58.37%

Sunni
Candidates		List	Party Affiliation	Votes	% of total votes	Elected?
Rashid Karami	رشيد كرامي	Karami	Karami affiliates	7684	55.60%	Yes
Hashem Al-Husseini	هاشم الحسيني	Karami	Karami affiliates	7590	54.92%	Yes
Qabuli Zouk	قبولي الذوق	Karami	National Call Party	6873	49.73%	Yes
Saadi Al Munla	سعدي المنلا	Karami	Unclear	6714	48.58%	Yes
Nasuh Al-Fadil	نصوح الفاضل	Karami	Unclear	6404	46.34%	Yes
Mayez Muqqadam	مايز المقدم	Muqqadam	Unclear	4238	30.67%	No
Ashraf Kabbara	اشرف كبارة	Muqqadam	Unclear	3687	26.68%	No
Shamseddine Raad	شمس الدين رعد	Muqqadam	Unclear	3550	25.69%	No
Muhammad Mustafa Alameddine	محمّد مصطفى علم الدين	Muqqadam	Unclear	3321	24.03%	No
Mustafa Zouk	مصطفى الذوق	Muqqadam	Unclear	3229	23.36%	No
Tariq Al-Yafi	طارق اليافي	-	Unclear	3135	22.68%	No
Samir Al-Rafei	سمير الرافعي	-	Unclear	2884	20.87%	No
Radwan Chahal	رضوان الشهال	-	Unclear	2666	19.29%	No
Akram Sultan	اكرم سلطان	-	Unclear	2065	14.94%	No
Hussein Al-Samad	حسين الصمد	-	Unclear	2159	15.62%	No
Salem Kabbara	سالم كبارة	-	Unclear	1407	10.18%	No
Abdallah Al-Bissar	عبدالله البيسار	-	Unclear	569	4.12%	No

Greek Orthodox
Candidates		List	Party Affiliation	Votes	% of total votes	Elected?
Fouad Al-Bart	هاشم الحسيني	Karami	Karami affiliates	7734	55.96%	Yes
Gibran Nahas	جبران نحاس	Muqqadam	Pro-Constitutional Bloc	4053	29.33%	No

=== North Lebanon II ===
- Voters: 33698
- Total Votes: 18975
- Turnout: 56.31%

Maronite
Candidates		List	Party Affiliation	Votes	% of total votes	Elected?
Antoine Estefan	انطوان اسطفان	Karam-Estefan	Unclear	8739	46.06%	Yes
Camille Akl	كميل عقل	Karam-Estefan	Independent	8150	42.95%	Yes
Youssef Karam	يوسف كرم	Karam-Estefan	Unclear	7928	41.78%	Yes
Fouad Douaihy	فؤاد الدويهي	Karam-Estefan	Unclear	6903	36.38%	No
Nadra Issa Al-Khoury	ندرة عيسى الخوري	Karam-Estefan	Unclear	6855	36.13%	No
Hamid Frangieh	حميد فرنجية	Frangieh	Frangieh affiliates	7922	41.75%	Yes
Qabalan Issa Al-Khoury	قبلان عيسى الخوري	Frangieh	Unclear	7625	40.18%	Yes
Rene Moawad	رينيه معوض	Frangieh	Frangieh affiliates	6886	36.29%	No
Youssef Daw	يوسف ضو	Frangieh	Unclear	6676	35.18%	No
Boutros Tarabieh	بطرس طربيه	Frangieh	Unclear	6245	32.91%	No
Jean Harb	جان حرب	-	Unclear	4483	23.63%	No
Jawad Boulos	جواد بولس	-	Unclear	4301	22.67%	No
Asaad Al-Khoury	أسعد الخوري	-	Unclear	3665	19.31%	No
Saed Touq	سعيد طوق	-	Unclear	3399	17.91%	No
Jamil Kayrouz	جميل كيروز	-	Unclear	529	2.79%	No
Elias Al-Hayek	الياس الحويك	-	Unclear	352	1.86%	No

Greek Orthodox
Candidates		List	Party Affiliation	Votes	% of total votes	Elected?
Philippe Boulos	فيليب بولس	Karam-Estefan	Unclear	7775	40.98%	Yes
Nicolas Ghosn	نقولا غصن	Frangieh	Frangieh affiliates	7670	40.42%	No
Michel Mufrej	ميشال مفرج	-	Unclear	3836	20.22%	No

=== North Lebanon III ===
The competition was carried out between Suleiman Al-Ali and Muhammad Aboud Abdul Razaq, political bosses of Akkar who were both in the pro-government coalition in 1947. Ali's list won in its entirety. The animosity between the duo would result in Abdul Razaq's assassination in 1953.

- Voters: 19001
- Total Votes: 11350
- Turnout: 59.73%

Sunni
Candidates		List	Party Affiliation	Votes	% of total votes	Elected?
Suleiman Al-Ali	سليمان العلي	Ali	Unclear	7367	64.91%	Yes
Bashir Al-Othman	بشير العثمان	Ali	Unclear	5737	50.55%	Yes
Muhammad Aboud Abdul Razaq	محمّد عبود عبدالرزاق	Abdul Razaq	Unclear	4086	36.00%	No
Mahmoud Marei Al-Khaled	محمود مرعي الخالد	Abdul Razaq	Unclear	4029	35.50%	No
Shawqi Dandash	شوقي دندش	-	Unclear	1486	13.09%	No

Greek Orthodox
Candidates		List	Party Affiliation	Votes	% of total votes	Elected?
Yaqoub Al-Sarraf	يعقوب الصرّاف	Ali	Unclear	7313	64.43%	Yes
Wadie Atiyeh	وديع عطية	Abdul Razaq	Unclear	4035	35.55%	No

Maronite
Candidates		List	Party Affiliation	Votes	% of total votes	Elected?
Albert Al-Hajj	ألبير الحاج	Ali	Kataeb Party	7183	63.29%	Yes
Michel Al-Daher	ميشال الضاهر	Abdul Razaq	Unclear	4170	36.74%	No

=== South Lebanon ===
The politics of South Governorate before the civil war is embodied in the rivalry of two Shiite families: Asaad and Osseiran. Same as the previous election, the heads of the families, Ahmed Asaad and Adel Osseiran, each led a list, both of which had Riad Al Solh as a candidate.

- Voters: 58038
- Total Votes: 35814
- Turnout: 61.71%

Shiite
Candidates		List	Party Affiliation	Votes	% of total votes	Elected?
Ahmed Asaad	أحمد الأسعد	Asaad	Unclear	24039	67.12%	Yes
Muhammad Safieddine	محمّد صفي الدين	Asaad	Unclear	23073	64.42%	Yes
Ali Badreddine	علي بدر الدين	Asaad	Unclear	22856	63.82%	Yes
Muhammad Al-Fadl	محمّد الفضل	Asaad	Unclear	22675	63.31%	Yes
Ali Bazzi	علي بزي	Asaad	National Call Party	22075	61.64%	Yes
Hussein Abdallah	حسين العبدالله	Asaad	Unclear	22107	61.73%	Yes
Suleiman Arab	سليمان عرب	Asaad	Unclear	21415	59.80%	Yes
Muhammad Ali Ghatimi	محمّد علي غطيمي	Asaad	Unclear	20929	58.44%	Yes
Adel Osseiran	عادل عسيران	Osseiran	Unclear	14484	40.44%	No
Ezzat Al-Zain	عزت الزين	Osseiran	Unclear	14521	40.55%	No
Kazem al-Khalil	كاظم الخليل	Osseiran	Unclear	13624	38.04%	No
Sadreddine Sharafeddine	صدرالدين شرف الدين	Osseiran	Unclear	13158	36.74%	No
Saed Osseiran	سعيد عسيران	Osseiran	Unclear	13014	36.34%	No
Abdul Latif Baydoun	عبداللطيف بيضون	Osseiran	Unclear	12634	35.28%	No
Ali Abdallah	علي العبدالله	Osseiran	Unclear	12062	33.68%	No
Muhammad Khalifa	محمّد خليفة	Osseiran	Unclear	11746	32.80%	No
Hussein Al-Zain	حسين الزين	-	Unclear	47	0.13%	No

Sunni
Candidates		List	Party Affiliation	Votes	% of total votes	Elected?
Riad Al Solh	رياض الصلح	Asaad/Osseiran	Pro-Constitutional Bloc	25813	72.08%	Yes
Suhail Chehab	سهيل شهاب	Asaad	Unclear	22226	62.06%	Yes
Nazih Al-Bizri	نزيه البزري	Osseiran	Unclear	14260	39.82%	No

Maronite
Candidates		List	Party Affiliation	Votes	% of total votes	Elected?
Maroun Kanaan	مارون كنعان	Asaad	Unclear	24553	68.56%	Yes
Rashad Azar	رشاد عازار	Asaad	Unclear	22650	63.24%	Yes
Antoine Francis	انطوان فرنسيس	Osseiran	Unclear	13006	36.32%	No
George Gideon	جورج جدعون	Osseiran	Unclear	11266	31.46%	No

Greek Catholic
Candidates		List	Party Affiliation	Votes	% of total votes	Elected?
Nikola Salem	نقولا سالم	Asaad	Unclear	22390	62.52%	Yes
Hanna Al-Haddad	حنا الحداد	Osseiran	Unclear	11266	31.46%	No
Shukrallah Al-Haddad	شكرالله الحداد	-	Unclear	1423	3.97%	No

Greek Orthodox
Candidates		List	Party Affiliation	Votes	% of total votes	Elected?
Elias Traboulsi	الياس طرابلسي	Asaad	Unclear	20314	56.72%	Yes
Bishop Boulos Al-Khoury	المطران بولس الخوري	Osseiran	Unclear	15359	42.89%	No
