= National Call Party =

Political party in Lebanon

The National Call Party (Arabic: حزب النداء القومي, hizb al-nida' al-qawmi) was a political party in Lebanon. The party was founded by Takieddin el-Solh and Ali Bazzi. The organization was not a formally structured party, it functioned as a political platform for the el-Solh family and drew support mainly from poor Sunnis in Beirut and Sidon.

The party made some inroads in Tripoli ahead of the 1947 elections, in the wake of a corruption scandal damaging the position of local strongman Rachid Karami. Qabuli Zuq, elected to parliament in 1951, was the chairman of the Tripoli branch of the party.

In August 1952 the party formed an alliance called the Popular Front together with the Kataeb Party and the Muslim National Congress.
