= Farid Jubran =

Farid Youssef Jubran (Arabic: فريد يوسف جبران; 1911–1995) was a Lebanese Latin Catholic politician. He was born in 1911. Jubran was one of the co-founders of the Progressive Socialist Party in 1949. Outside politics Jubran owned a Beirut-based auditing firm.

Jubran became the president of the National Labour Union Front in 1946, and struggled for the implementation of Labour Law.

Jubran contested the 1957 parliamentary election unsuccessfully. In the 1960 parliament election Jubran won the Minorities seat from the Beirut II constituency, contesting on the list of Adnan al-Hakim. He retained the Beirut II Minorities seat in the 1964, 1968 and 1972 elections. In the latter election, Jubran contested on the list of Rashid as-Solh.

He was a leader of the National Struggle Front and the Commercial Workers and Employees Trade Union in Lebanon. In 1966 Jubran, then vice president of PSP, attended the Tricontinental Conference in Havana.

After the assassination of PSP leader Kamal Jumblatt in 1977, Jubran briefly served as interim president of PSP.

Jubran died in 1995. The Farid Jubran Square was inaugurated in Beirut in 2014.
