= 1943 Lebanese general election =

- 29 August 1943 (first round); 4 September 1943 (second round)
- All 55 seats in the Parliament of Lebanon; 28 seats needed for a majority
- Turnout: 50.88%
Party	Leader	Seats
National Bloc	Émile Eddé	11
Constitutional Bloc	Bechara El Khoury	6
ARF		1
ADLP		1
Independents	–	36
This lists parties that won seats. See the complete results below.
Prime Minister before	Prime Minister after
Petro Trad; Unaffiliated	Riad Al Solh; Constitutional Bloc

General elections were held in Lebanon on 29 August 1943, with a second round in some constituencies on 4 September. Independent candidates won the majority of seats. Voter turnout was 50.9%.

== Apportionment of seats over districts and communities ==
	tot.	Ma	GO	GC	AO	Mi	Su	Sh	Dr
tot.	55	18	6	3	2	1	11	10	4
Beirut	9	1	1		2	1	3	1	
Bekaa	7	1	1	1			1	2	1
Mount L.	17	10	1	1			1	1	3
North	12	5	2				5		
South	10	1	1	1			1	6	

== Results ==
Party	Votes	%	Seats
National Bloc			11
Constitutional Bloc			6
Armenian Democratic Liberal Party			1
Armenian Revolutionary Federation			1
Independents			36
Total			55
Total votes	129,621	–	
Registered voters/turnout	254,748	50.88	
Source: Nohlen et al.

== See also ==
- 1943 Lebanese presidential election
