= 1947 Lebanese general election =

- 25 May 1947 (first round); 1 June 1947 (second round)
- All 55 seats in the Parliament of Lebanon; 28 seats needed for a majority
- Turnout: 61.45% (▲10.57pp)
Party	Leader	Seats	+/–
Constitutional Bloc	Camille Chamoun	12	+6
ARF		2	+1
Independents	–	41	+5
This lists parties that won seats. See the complete results below.
Prime Minister before	Prime Minister after
Riad Al Solh; Constitutional Bloc	Riad Al Solh; Constitutional Bloc

General elections were held in Lebanon on 25 May 1947, with a second round in some constituencies on 1 June. Independent candidates won the majority of seats. Voter turnout was 61.5%.

As'ad AbuKhalil described the 1947 election as "one of the most corrupt in Lebanese history", and claimed that it was rigged by Camille Chamoun.

== Apportionment of seats over districts and communities ==
The apportionment of seats over districts and communities was the same as in 1943.

	tot.	Ma	GO	GC	AO	Mi	Su	Sh	Dr
tot.	55	18	6	3	2	1	11	10	4
Beirut	9	1	1		2	1	3	1	
Bekaa	7	1	1	1			1	2	1
Mount L.	17	10	1	1			1	1	3
North	12	5	2				5		
South	10	1	1	1			1	6	

== Results ==
Party	Votes	%	Seats	+/–
Constitutional Bloc			12	+6
Armenian Revolutionary Federation			2	+1
Armenian Democratic Liberal Party			0	–1
Kataeb Party			0	New
National Bloc			0	–11
Independents			41	+5
Total			55	0
Total votes	167,853	–		
Registered voters/turnout	273,142	61.45		
Source: Nohlen et al.
