= 1960 Lebanese general election =

- 12 June 1960 (first round); 2 July 1960 (second round)
- All 99 seats in the Parliament of Lebanon; 50 seats needed for a majority
- Turnout: 50.74% (▼2.50pp)
Party	Leader	Seats	+/–
Kataeb	Pierre Gemayel	6	+4
National Liberal	Camille Chamoun	5	New
Constitutional Union		5	+2
PSP	Kamal Jumblatt	5	+3
National Bloc	Raymond Eddé	4	−1
ARF	Movses Der Kaloustian	4	+2
Najjadeh Party	Adnan al-Hakim	1	New
National Organisation		1	New
Independents	–	68	+17
This lists parties that won seats. See the complete results below.
Prime Minister before	Prime Minister after
Ahmad Daouk; Independent	Saeb Salam; Independent

General elections were held in Lebanon between 12 June and 2 July 1960. Independent candidates won the majority of seats. Voter turnout was 50.7%.

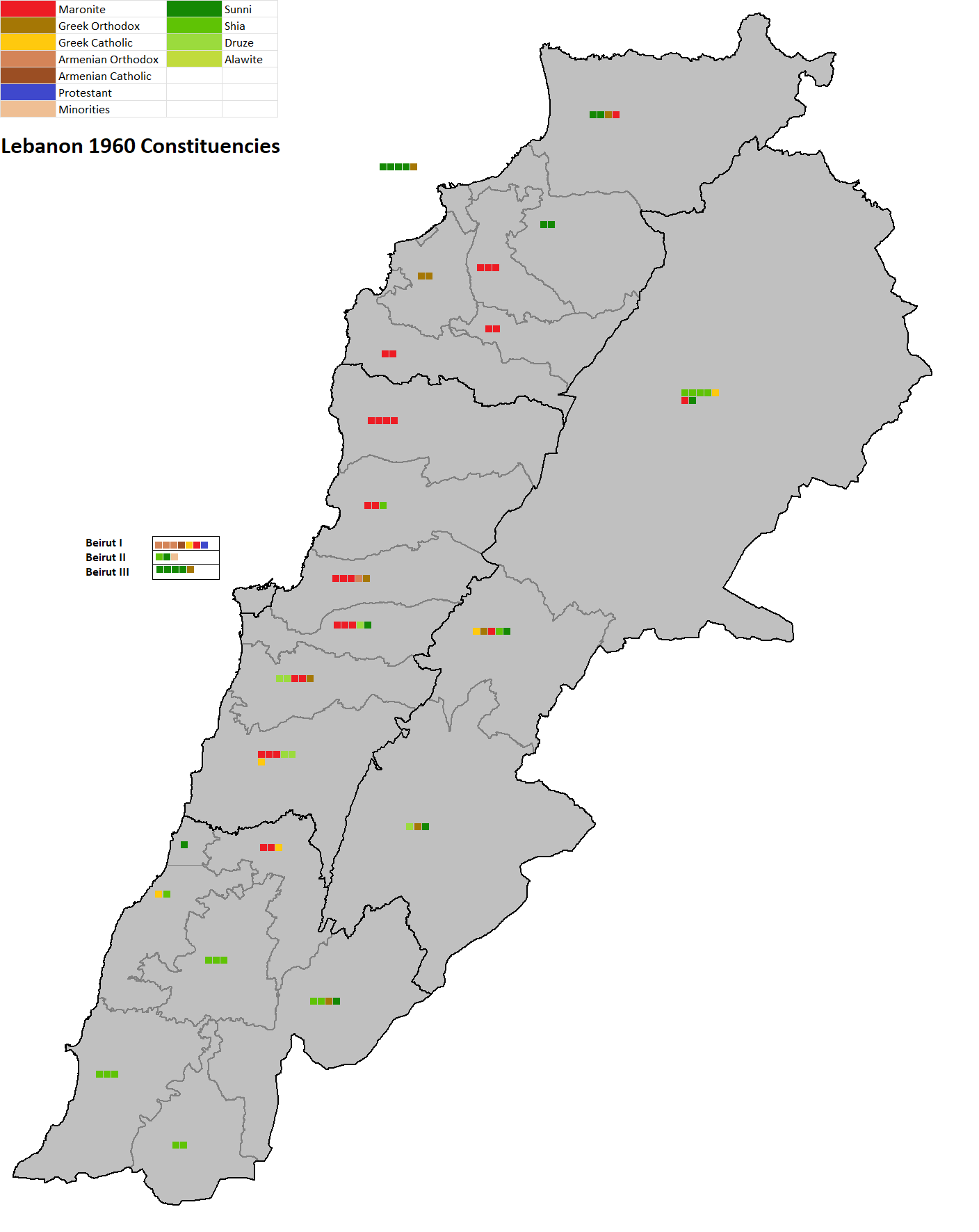
Map depicting constituencies for 1960 Lebanese elections

== Results ==
Party	Votes	%	Seats	+/–
Kataeb Party			6	+4
National Liberal Party			5	New
Party of the Constitutional Union			5	+2
Progressive Socialist Party			5	+3
National Bloc			4	–1
Armenian Revolutionary Federation			4	+2
National Organisation Party			1	New
Najjadeh Party			1	New
Independents			68	+17
Total			99	+33
Total votes	527,271	–		
Registered voters/turnout	1,039,232	50.74		
Source: Nohlen et al.
