= 1968 Lebanese general election =

- 24 March–7 April 1968

All 99 seats in the Parliament of Lebanon 50 seats needed for a majority
- Turnout: 49.57% (▼3.42pp)
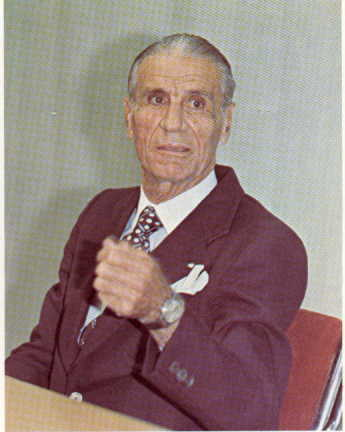

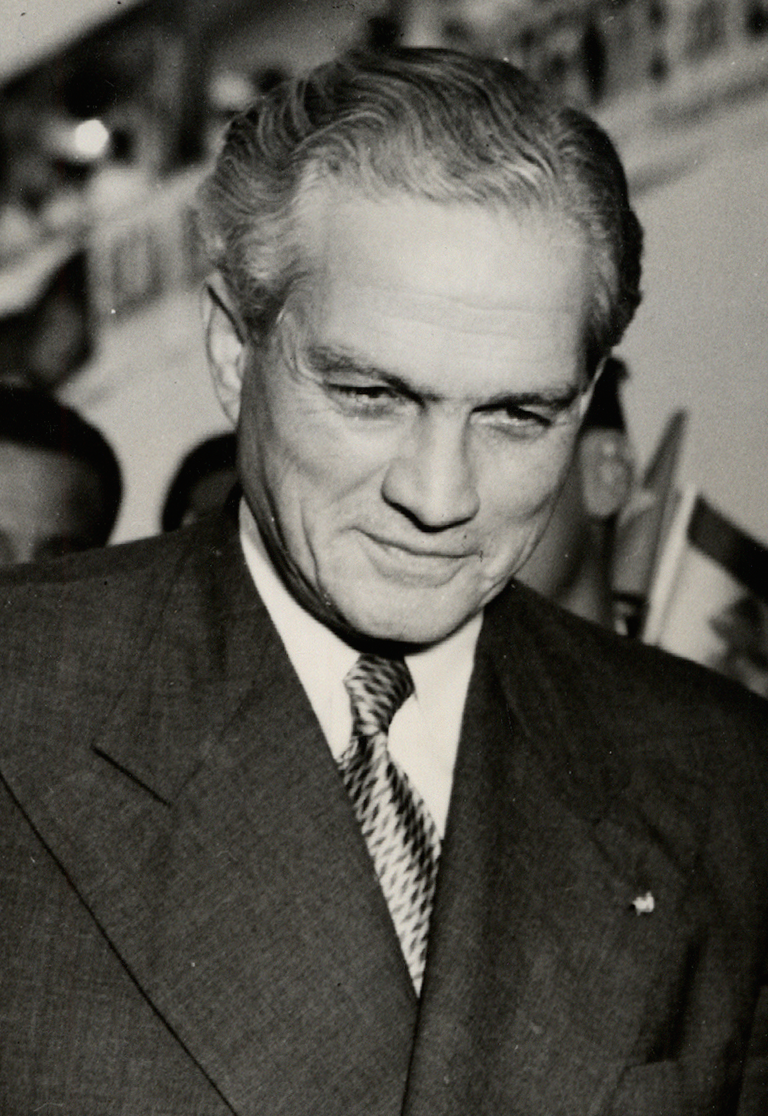

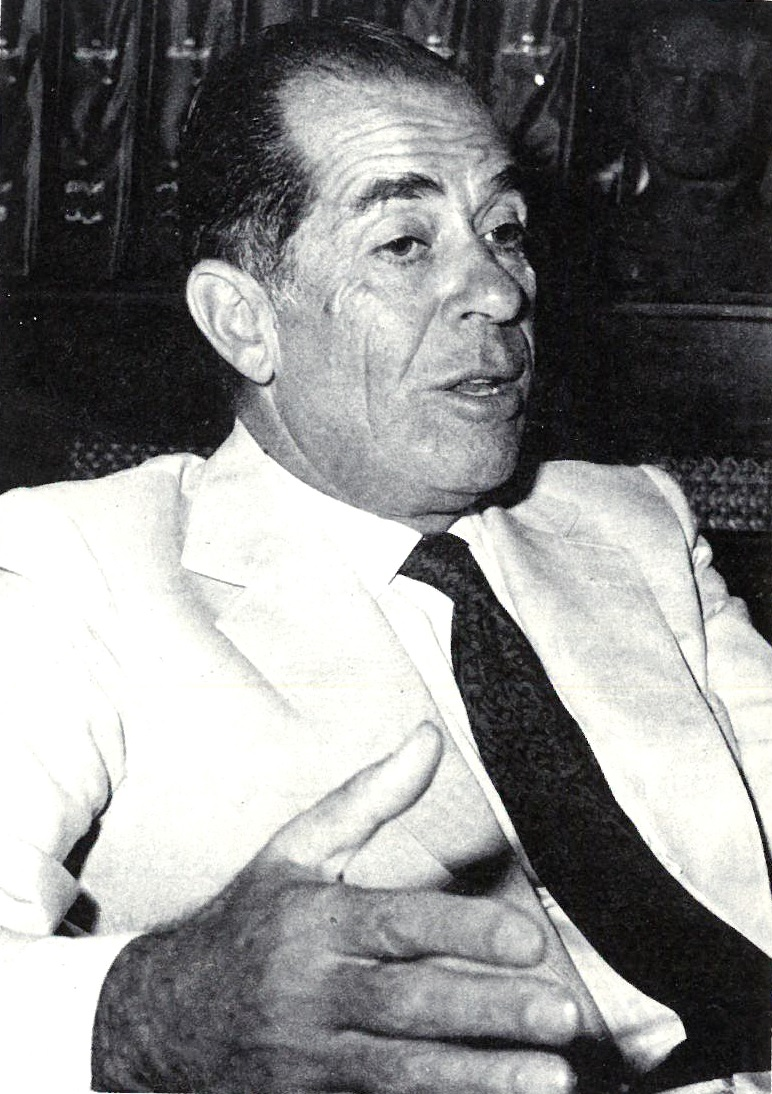
	First party	Second party	Third party
Leader	Pierre Gemayel	Camille Chamoun	Raymond Eddé
Party	Kataeb	National Liberal	National Bloc
Leader's seat	Beirut I	Chouf	Byblos
Last election	4	7	3
Seats won	9	8	6
Seat change	▲5	▲1	▲3
Prime Minister before election
Abdallah El-Yafi
Independent
Elected Prime Minister
Abdallah El-Yafi
Independent

General elections were held in Lebanon between 24 March and 7 April 1968. Independent candidates won the majority of seats, although many of them were considered to be members of various blocs. Voter turnout was 49.6%. Politically the election was a confrontation between the mainly Christian Tripartite Alliance and Chehabists candidates.

== Background ==
According to the 1960 electoral law, the 99 seats were divided amongst ethnic and religious groups:

Group	Seats
Maronite Christians	30
Sunni Muslims	20
Shi'ite Muslims	19
Greek Orthodox	11
Druze	6
Greek Catholics	6
Armenian Orthodox	4
Protestants	1
Armenian Catholics	1
Other	1

== Results ==
Party	Votes	%	Seats	+/–
Kataeb Party			9	+5
National Liberal Party			8	+1
National Bloc			6	+3
Progressive Socialist Party			5	–1
Armenian Revolutionary Federation			4	0
Party of the Constitutional Union			3	–2
Najjadeh Party			1	+1
National Action Movement			1	New
Independents			62	–8
Total			99	0
Total votes	614,280	–		
Registered voters/turnout	1,239,199	49.57		
Source: Nohlen et al.

== Electoral districts ==
=== Marjeyoun-Hasbaya ===
The district has 4 seats allocated to 2 Shiites, 1 Sunni and 1 Greek Orthodox Christian. There were eleven candidates in the fray, with ten candidates contesting on three different tickets. The eleventh candidate contested on his own. The fight stood primarily between two tickets, each headed by a candidate from the al-As'ad family (a powerful Shiite family in the area).
