= 1964 Lebanese general election =

Lebanese politics

- 5 April 1964 (first round); 3 May 1964 (second round)
- All 99 seats in the Parliament of Lebanon; 50 seats needed for a majority
- Turnout: 52.99% (▲2.25pp)
Party	Leader	Seats	+/–
National Liberal	Camille Chamoun	7	+2
PSP	Kamal Jumblatt	6	+1
Constitutional Union	Vacant	5	0
Kataeb	Pierre Gemayel	4	−2
ARF	Movses Der Kaloustian	4	0
National Bloc	Raymond Eddé	3	−1
Independents	–	70	+2
This lists parties that won seats. See the complete results below.
Prime Minister before	Prime Minister after
Hussein Al Oweini; Unaffiliated	Rashid Karami; Progressive Socialist

General elections were held in Lebanon between 5 April and 3 May 1964. Independent candidates won the majority of seats. Voter turnout was 53.0%.

== Results ==
Party	Votes	%	Seats	+/–
National Liberal Party			7	+2
Progressive Socialist Party			6	+1
Party of the Constitutional Union			5	0
Kataeb Party			4	–2
Armenian Revolutionary Federation			4	0
National Bloc			3	–1
Najjadeh Party			0	–1
Independents			70	+2
Total			99	0
Total votes	544,169	–		
Registered voters/turnout	1,026,846	52.99		
Source: Nohlen et al.
