= Progressive Socialist Party =

Lebanese political party

Progressive Socialist Party الحزب التقدمي الإشتراكي
- Abbreviation: PSP
- Leader: Taymur Jumblatt
- Secretary-General: Zafer Nasser
- Founders: Kamal Jumblatt; Farid Jubran; Albert Adeeb; Abdallah Alayli; Fouad Rizk; George Hanna
- Founded: 1 May 1949
- Headquarters: Jabal El Arab Street, Wata El Msaytbeh
- Newspaper: Al Anbaa (Lebanon)
- Youth wing: Progressive Youth Organization (Lebanon)
- Military wing: People's Liberation Army (1975–1994)
- Ideology: Socialism
- Political position: Left-wing
- National affiliation: March 14 Alliance (2005–2009)
- International affiliation: Progressive Alliance; Socialist International
- Parliamentary bloc: Democratic Gathering
- Parliament: 8 / 128
- Council of Ministers: 2 / 24

Party flag

Website
- psp.org.lb

The Progressive Socialist Party (Arabic: الحزب التقدمي الاشتراكي, romanized: al-Ḥizb at-Taqadummī al-Ishtirākī) is a left-wing political party in Lebanon. Its confessional base is the Lebanese Druze and its regional base is in Mount Lebanon Governorate, especially the Chouf District. Founded by Kamal Jumblatt in 1949. the party was led by his son Walid Jumblatt between 1977 and 25 May 2023. On 25 June 2023 the son of Walid, Taymur Jumblatt, was officially consecrated as leader of the PSP.

== History ==
=== Origins ===
The PSP originated from members of several different leftist, Democratic socialist, and progressive movements. Initially, the party was advertised as a secular, progressive political party that also represented the Druzes. Jumblatt appealed to Druzes because of his position as zaim, to other Muslims who were disenchanted with the traditional political system, and to members of some other sects who were attracted by his secular and progressive rhetoric. By 1953 the PSP claimed some 18,000 adherents, and in the 1964 Chamber of Deputies it could count on as many as 10 deputies. Although initially promoting secularism, the party gradually adopted some religious Druze policies. By this time, the party was established as a party devoted to Druze representation and rhetoric, while still maintaining their progressive ideals.

From 1951 through 1972 the party had between three and six deputies in parliament.

=== Lebanese Civil War (1975–1990) ===
Under Kamal Jumblatt's leadership, the PSP was a major element in the Lebanese National Movement (LNM), which supported Lebanon's Arab identity and sympathised with the Palestinians. Despite Jumblatt's initial reluctance to engage in paramilitarism, it built its own military wing, the People's Liberation Army (PLA) which proved to be one of the strongest private armies in the Lebanese Civil War of 1975 to 1990. It conquered much of Mount Lebanon and the Chouf District. Its main adversaries were the Kataeb Regulatory Forces militia, and later the Lebanese Forces militia (which absorbed the Kataeb). The PSP suffered a setback in 1977, when Kamal Jumblatt was assassinated. His son Walid succeeded him as leader of the party.

From the Israeli withdrawal from the Chouf in 1983 to the end of the civil war, the PSP ran the Civil Administration of the Mountain in the area under its control. Tolls levied at PSP/PLA militia checkpoints provided a major source of income for the administration, which provided social and public services.

The PSP played an important role in the Mountain War under the leadership of Walid Jumblatt: after the Israel Defense Forces (IDF) retreated from the Chouf District, important battles took place there between the PSP/PLA and the Lebanese Forces militia. Both the Lebanese Forces and the PSP/PLA were accused of committing massacres and atrocities against one another as tit-for-tat (revenge killings). The PSP also systematically displaced many Christian civilians in the Chouf region by committing massacres and mass executions.

During the war years, the PSP controlled the seaport at Jieh. In March 1989 General Michel Aoun established a blockade of the port which resulted in artillery exchanges between his forces and a combination of PSP, Amal and the Syrian Army in which at least 90 people were killed and several hundred wounded.

=== Post-war ===
After the restoration of constitutional rule in 1989, the PSP was the major ally of Syria in Lebanon and its leader Walid Jumblatt was in close relations with the Syrian Army and intelligence generals in Lebanon, such as Ghazi Kanaan, and also with the Syrian Vice President Abdul Halim Khaddam. In the 1992 general election it won four seats.

In the post-Civil War period, Jumblatt was known for switching allegiances and acting as a kingmaker in deals between factions. The PSP participated in a number of governments, but, after the Syria Accountability Act and the UN Resolution 1559 and the change of the balance of powers in the region after the occupation of Iraq, joined the opposition and took up a position opposed to the role of Syria in Lebanon's politics. Unlike some opponents of the Syrian presence, Jumblatt did not oppose the presence of the Syrian army per se, but contended that the Syrian intelligence services were exerting undue influence.

Following the passage of United Nations Security Council Resolution 1559 in September 2004, calling for a Syrian withdrawal from Lebanon, Jumblatt was particularly prominent in the opposition. However, he was opposed to the demand that Hezbollah be disarmed, and insisted on maintaining relations with the Shia Islamist party. Later, he has drifted into sharp opposition towards the group, and has decided to support their disarmament, claiming that Syria and Iran are trying to take over Lebanon through Hezbollah. After the assassination of Rafic Hariri in February 2005, Jumblatt joined the anti-Syria camp, despite his long support to Syria. As part of the March 14 Alliance, the PSP won 16 seats in the general elections held in 2005. It won eleven seats in the 2009 Lebanese general election and had three ministers in the 2009 First Cabinet of Saad Hariri (Ghazi Aridi, Akram Chehayeb, and Wael Abou Faour, all Druze). However, after the March 8 Alliance regained power in 2011, the PSP positioned itself in the political centre, and gave allegiance to the new government. Under the banner of the Democratic Gathering bloc, had three ministers (Alaaeddine Terro, Sunni, plus Aridi and Faour) in the 2011 Second Cabinet of Najib Mikati.

In late January 2011, Jumblatt declared not to support the disarming of Hezbollah. In 2013, it endorsed the 15 March alliance-led Cabinet of Tammam Salam (it had two ministers in this government, Faour and Akram Chehayeb). By 2015, the PLP was allied with the Future Movement and it had two ministers (Marwan Hamadeh and Ayman Shkeir) in the 2016 Second Cabinet of Saad Hariri, led by the Future Movement and two ministers again (Chehayeb and Faour) in the 2019 Third Cabinet of Saad Hariri.

With the onset of the Syrian civil war in 2011, Jumblatt and the PSP clearly showed their support for the Syrian opposition, and urged the Syrian Druze community to stand against the Assad government, and join the rebels.

At the ceremony marking the 40th anniversary of the killing of Kamal Jumblatt in Moukhtara on 19 February 2017, Walid Jumblatt symbolically gave his keffiyeh to his son Taymour Jumblatt, symbolically marking the generational shift in the party leadership. That year, Jumblatt again refrained from saying Hezbollah should be disarmed. In the 2018 Lebanese general election, the Democratic Gathering bloc, the PSP's parliamentary platform, fielded 10 candidates across the country. For the first time since 1992, Walid Jumblatt did not stand as a candidate, with Taymour taking over as the party leader. The party fielded candidates for 3 out of 4 Druze seats in Mount Lebanon IV, keeping with the tradition of leaving a seat uncontested to help Lebanese Democratic Party chief Talal Arslan get elected. PSP joined joint lists with the Future Movement in Beirut II, Bekaa II and Mount Lebanon IV, and with Lebanese Forces in Mount Lebanon III and Mount Lebanon IV. It dropped to just nine seats in the 2018 election. The party served in the opposition to the short-lived 2019 Cabinet of Hassan Diab, returning to power as part of the Third Cabinet of Najib Mikati in 2021, with just one minister, Abbas Halabi.

In late May 2023, Walid Jumblatt declared his resignation as leader of the Progressive Socialist Party after a 46-year tenure. Around 2,000 supporters gathered in Ain Zhalta, a Druze town in the Chouf mountains, where members of the Progressive Socialist Party named political heir, Taymour Jumblatt, as their new leader. Taymour was the sole contender.

In February 2025, Lebanese Prime Minister Nawaf Salam announced his government, which consists of 24 ministers; the Progressive Socialist Party controls two portfolios: the Public Works and Transport Ministry, headed by Fayez Rasamny, and Agriculture Ministry, under Nizar Hani.

== Emblem ==
The white color in the logo and emblem symbolizes the idea of internal collective peace and global international peace, which it aims to achieve in accordance with what was stated in its charter when explaining doctrine and work.

The blue color symbolizes that the party does not deny the spiritual phenomenon in the life of the human being and in explaining the development of the individual and the group. On the contrary, it takes into account this phenomenon, believing that it is permanent throughout the ages in the life of the individual and the group.

The globe symbolizes the manifestation of human unity and its consolidation in this comprehensive popular movement that ultimately aims to unite the countries of the world in an international union that includes the entire globe, the unity of the human race, and the brotherhood and cooperation that must prevail among all peoples, regardless of their different colors, races, and beliefs.

The connection between the pen and the pickaxe symbolizes the two basic elements that operate in the development of systems, civilization, and history, "material labor and the effort of thought." In the union of the social groups that belong to them, victory is guaranteed in the cause of socialist progressivism.

The red color symbolizes the idea of a comprehensive revolution in systems and mentalities, as stated in the party's charter.

The triangle symbolizes the party's adoption of moral force, that means the direct action, and the principle of sacrifice as an approach and goal for its struggle.

== Electoral summary ==
| Election year | # of overall votes | % of overall vote | # of overall seats won | +/– | Bloc Leader |
|---|---|---|---|---|---|
| 1951 | | | 2 / 77 | ▲2 | Kamal Jumblatt |
| 1953 | | | 1 / 44 | ▼1 | Kamal Jumblatt |
| 1957 | | | 2 / 66 | ▲1 | Kamal Jumblatt |
| 1960 | | | 5 / 99 | ▲3 | Kamal Jumblatt |
| 1964 | | | 6 / 99 | ▲1 | Kamal Jumblatt |
| 1968 | | | 5 / 99 | ▼1 | Kamal Jumblatt |
| 1972 | | | 8 / 100 | ▲3 | Kamal Jumblatt |
| 1992 | | | 10 / 128 | ▲2 | Walid Jumblatt |
| 1996 | | 3.90% (#4) | 9 / 128 | ▼1 | Walid Jumblatt |
| 2000 | | 4.68% (#4) | 12 / 128 | ▲3 | Walid Jumblatt |
| 2005 | | 12.50% (#2) | 16 / 128 | ▲4 | Walid Jumblatt |
| 2009 | | | 11 / 128 | ▼5 | Walid Jumblatt |
| 2018 | 80,894 (#6) | 4.60% | 9 / 128 | ▼2 | Walid Jumblatt |
| 2022 | 75,485 (#5) | 4.18% | 8 / 128 | ▼1 | Walid Jumblatt |

== See also ==
- List of extrajudicial killings and political violence in Lebanon
- 2008 conflict in Lebanon
- Al-Mourabitoun
- Lebanese Civil War
- Lebanese Communist Party
- Lebanese National Movement
- List of political parties in Lebanon
- Popular Guard
- War of the Camps
