= 1957 Lebanese general election =

- 9–23 June 1957
- All 66 seats in the Parliament of Lebanon; 34 seats needed for a majority
- Turnout: 53.24% (▲3.25pp)
Party	Leader	Seats	+/–
National Bloc	Raymond Eddé	5	+2
Constitutional Union		3	0
Kataeb	Pierre Gemayel	2	+1
PSP	Kamal Jumblatt	2	+1
ARF		2	+1
SSNP		1	New
Independents	–	51	+16
This lists parties that won seats. See the complete results below.
Prime Minister before	Prime Minister after
Sami Solh; Unaffiliated	Sami Solh; Unaffiliated

General elections were held in Lebanon between 9 and 23 June 1957. Independent candidates, nearly all pro-president, won the majority of seats. Voter turnout was 53.2%.

With the support of Lebanese President Camille Chamoun CIA money was used to support selected candidates. CIA operative Wilbur Crane Eveland wrote that he would regularly drive to the Chamoun's presidential residence with "a briefcase full of Lebanese pounds" to be spent on the elections. American oil companies doing business in Lebanon also contributed funding.

== Apportionment of seats over districts and communities ==
	tot.	Ma	GO	GC	AO	AC	Mi	Su	Sh	Dr	subdivision
tot.	66	20	7	4	3	1	1	14	12	4	
Beirut-1	5	1	1		1			2			1: Ashrafieh, Rumayl, Sayfi, Musaytiba, Mazra
Beirut-2	6				1	1	1	2	1		2: Bachoura, Zkak El Blat, Mdawar, Port, Mina El Hosson, Dar Mreiseh, Ras Beirut
Zahleh	4	1	1	1				1			
Baalbek - Hermel	4			1					3		
Rashaya - West Bekaa	2							1		1	
Jbeil	1	1									
Keserwan	3	3									
North Metn	3	2	1								
Bourj Hammoud (Metn)	1				1						
Baabda	4	2							1	1	
Aley-Damour (Chouf-3)	3	1	1							1	
Deir El Kamar - Cheheem (Chouf-2)	2	1						1			
Baaklyn - Joun (Chouf-1)	3	1		1						1	
Akkar	4	1	1					2			
Dennieh	1							1			
Tripoli City	4		1					3			
Zghorta	2	2									
Koura	1		1								
Bsharrey	1	1									
Batroun	1	1									
Jezzine	3	2		1							
Saida (city)	1							1			
Zahrani (Saida villages)	1								1		
Nabatieh	2								2		
Tyre	2								2		
Bint Jbeil	1								1		
Marjeyoun - Hasbaya	1								1		

== Results ==
Party	Votes	%	Seats	+/–
National Bloc			5	+2
Party of the Constitutional Union			3	0
Kataeb Party			2	+1
Progressive Socialist Party			2	+1
Armenian Revolutionary Federation			2	+1
Syrian Social Nationalist Party			1	New
Independents			51	+16
Total			66	+22
Total votes	446,178	–		
Registered voters/turnout	838,089	53.24		
Source: Nohlen et al.

== Electoral districts ==
=== Bint Jbeil ===
There was a reform of the seat distribution of parliamentary constituencies in 1957, but Bint Jbeil remained a single-member constituency. Instead the neighbouring electoral district of Nabatieh was awarded an additional Shia seat. Ahmad al-As'ad argued that this move had been done deliberately to curtail his political influence. The Bint Jbeil seat was won by Ali Bazzi in the parliamentary election.
