= Yacoub Sarraf =

Lebanese politician

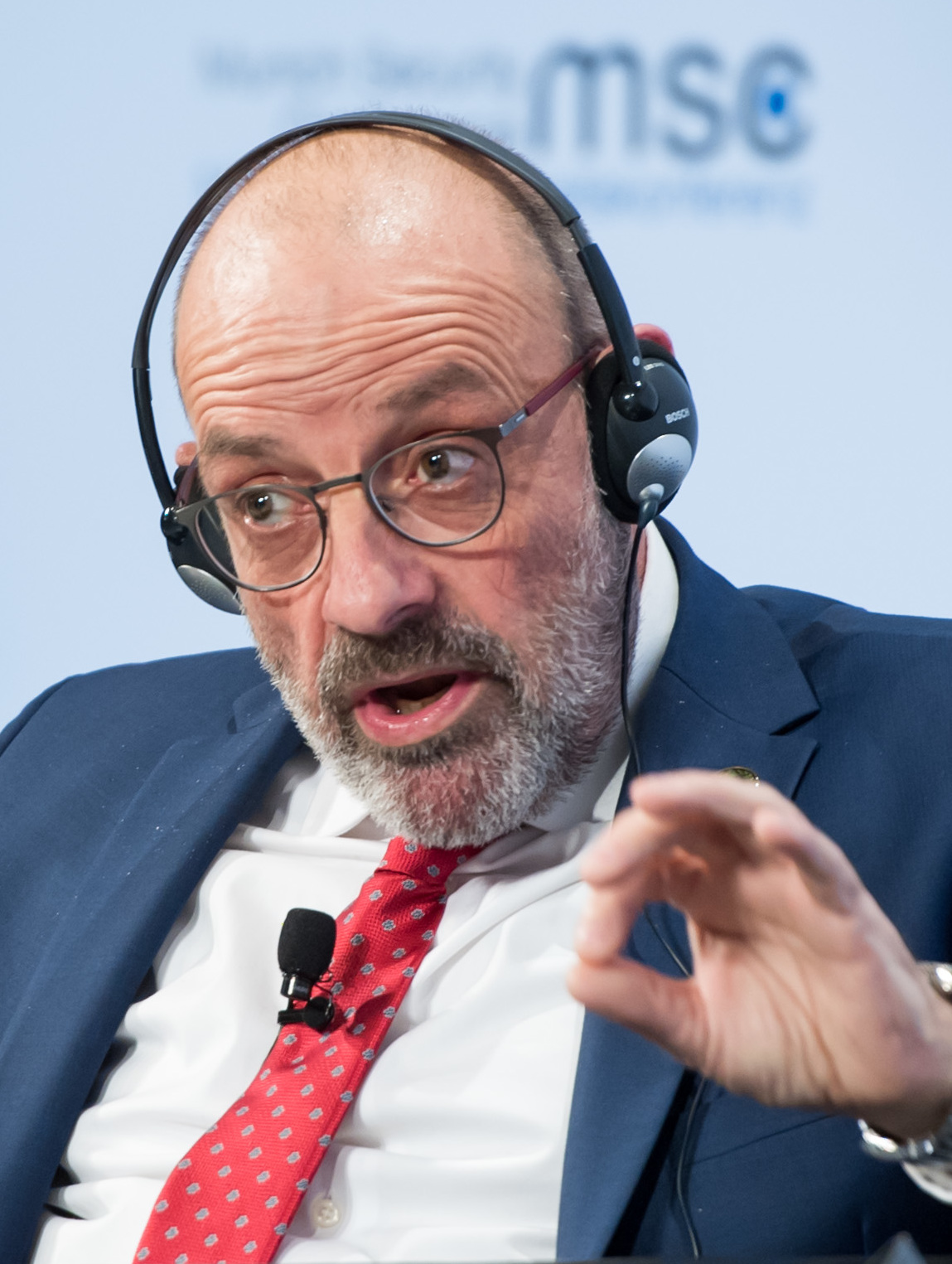
Yacoub Sarraf at the Munich Security Conference 2018

Yacoub Riad Sarraf (Arabic: يعقوب رياض الصراف; born 1961) is a Lebanese politician. He was born in the town of Miniara in the Akkar district of northern Lebanon.

== Biography ==
Sarraf, who is a Greek Orthodox Christian, has degrees in civil engineering and architecture from the American University of Beirut. He has two children. Sarraf worked for companies in Greece, France and Lebanon before being named governor of Beirut in 1999. In 2003 he became governor of Mount Lebanon.

Close to President Émile Lahoud, he was involved in numerous political clashes with the Beirut municipal council and with Rafiq Hariri.

Émile Lahoud had him appointed Minister of the Environment in the Fouad Siniora government formed in July 2005.

He held the post of Minister of Defense in an interim capacity while Elias Murr was convalescing from an assassination attempt of July 12, 2005.

As Environment Minister, he strongly denounced the oil spill caused by Israeli bombardment of the Jiyeh thermal power station during the Israel-Lebanon conflict.

He submitted his resignation from the cabinet on November 11, 2006, but Prime Minister Fouad Siniora rejected the resignation.

On 18 December 2016, he was appointed Minister of Defense in the newly formed cabinet of Prime Minister Saad Hariri, where he served until 31 January 2019.
