= Moussa Al-Maamari =

Lebanese architect

- Born: Moussa Abdel Karim Al-Maamari; July 27, 1930; Lebanon
- Died: January 31, 2018 (aged 87)
- Occupation: Architect

Moussa Al-Maamari (Arabic: موسى المعماري) was a Lebanese architect; born on 27 July 1930 in the lebanese village of Harat Al Saraya. He died on January 31, 2018 in Deir El Qamar.

== Early life ==
The story of Moussa Al-Maamari starts at 14 years old, when he had a crush on his neighbor known as Saydeh. Saydeh rejected Moussa's love because of his poverty which sparked his interest in building a castle, now known to be Moussa Castle.

An incident which left an impact in Moussa's life was a class assignment, by his teacher Anwar Arnouk in 1945. The class was tasked to draw a bird perched on a tree, but young Moussa decided to draw the castle which he dreamt of. This instance instigated the teacher's mockery and cruelness towards Moussa. The classroom is depicted today in Moussa's castle with the teacher beating young Moussa with a stick/cane.

Maamari left school to move to Saida, southern Lebanon, where he worked with his uncle, learning the masonry craft. He was commissioned by Emir Maurice Chehab, a Lebanese archaeologist and the head of Lebanon's Antiquities Department at the time, to renovate Saida's sea castle. He also worked on restoration of the Beiteddine Palace Museum.

Armed with practical skills from his previously mentioned works, and working day and night to save up to 15,000LBP, Al-Maamari successfully bought a piece of land between Deir El Kamar and Beiteddine and began laying the foundations to his castle dream, Moussa Castle, in 1963.

== Projects ==
His most notable build was Moussa Castle which is located on a hill between Deir El Kamar and Beiteddine, the castle features artifacts, gemstones, clothing, and 32,000 weapons.

== Death ==
He died in 2018 in Deir al-Qamar, Lebanon.

== See also ==
- Moussa Castle
