= Beiteddine Palace Museum =

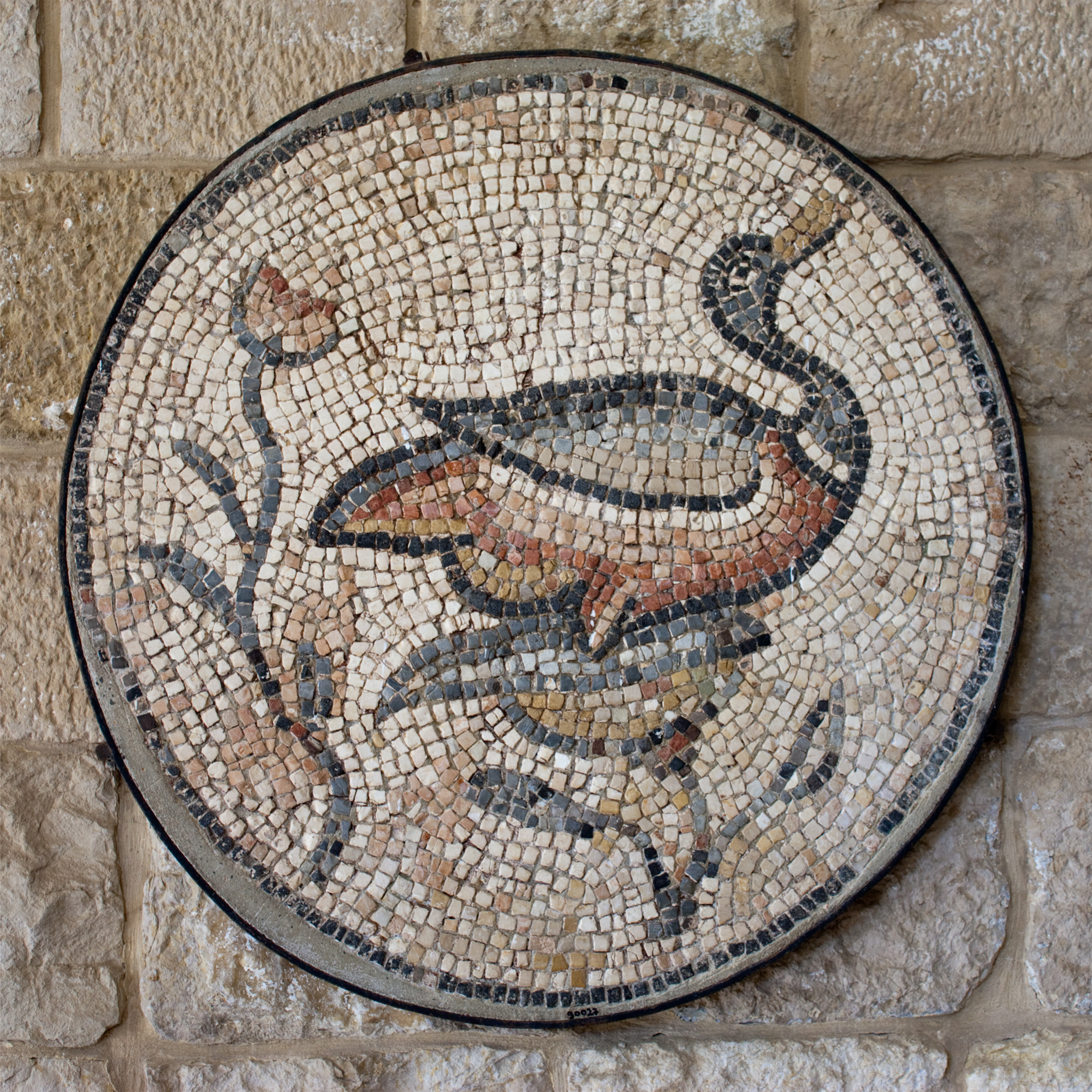
- Duck mosaic
- Location: Beiteddine Palace, Beiteddine, Lebanon
- Coordinates: 33.414639°N 35.344776°E
- Type: Archaeological

The Beiteddine Palace Museum is installed in the old stables, which once housed riders and horses of the Beiteddine Palace in Beiteddine, Lebanon. The museum displays a collection of Byzantine mosaics. The majority of them come from the site of the coastal city of Jieh, the ancient Porphyreon. The Byzantine-Greek inscriptions appearing on the mosaics date them back to the 5th and 6th centuries A.D. Further mosaics from different Lebanese sites are displayed in the adjacent palace gardens.

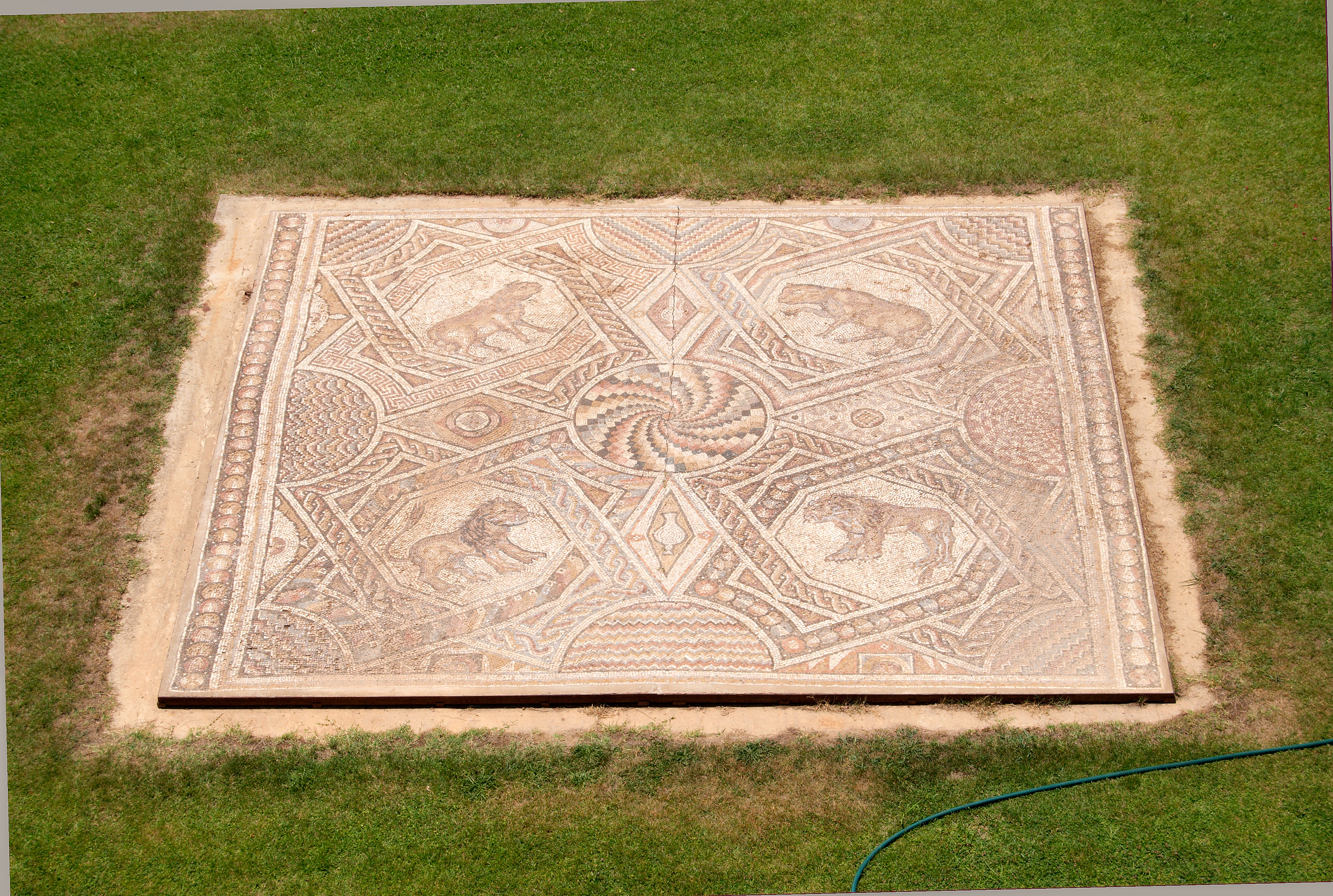
Mosaic in the palace garden

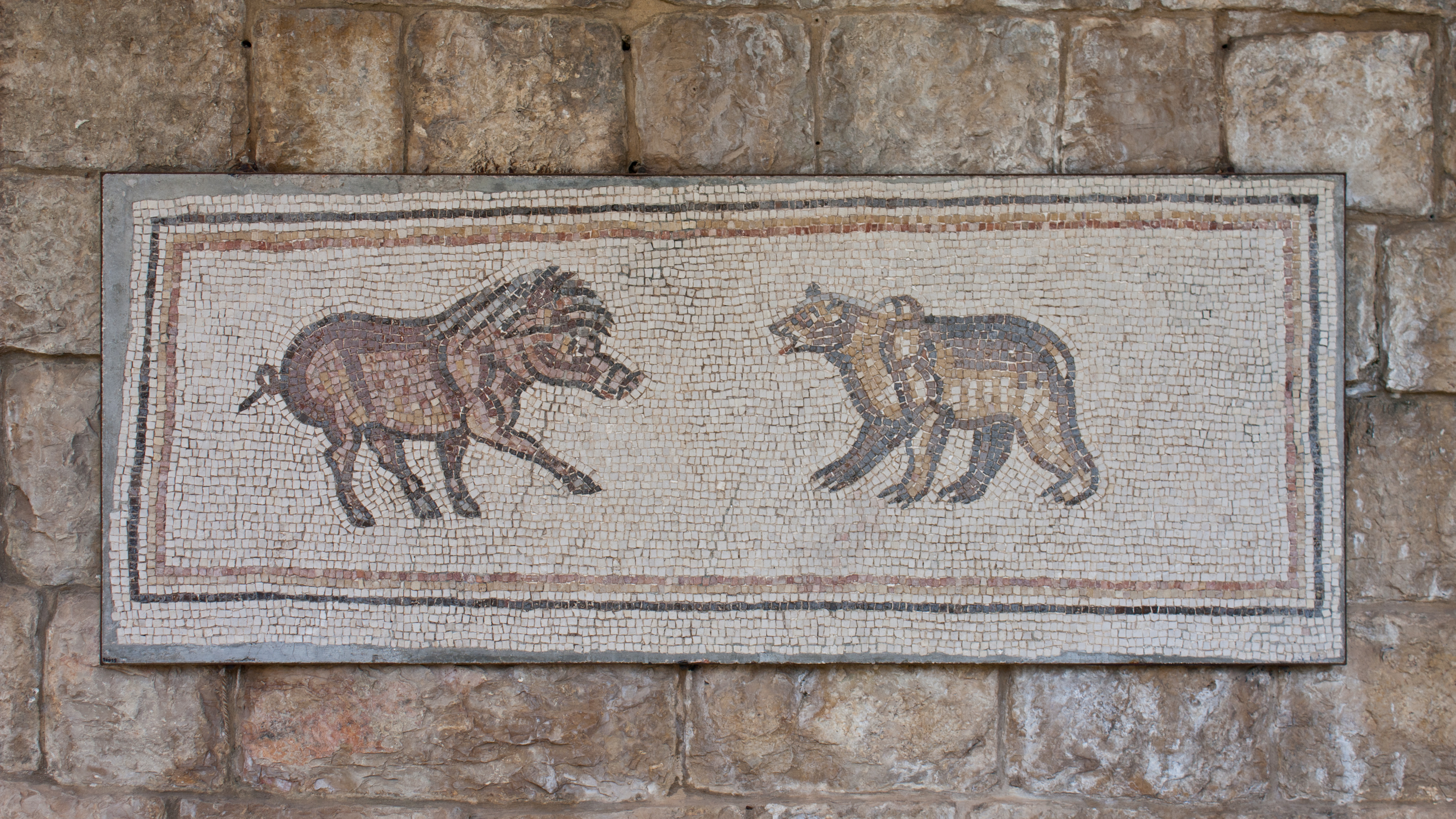
Wild boar and bear

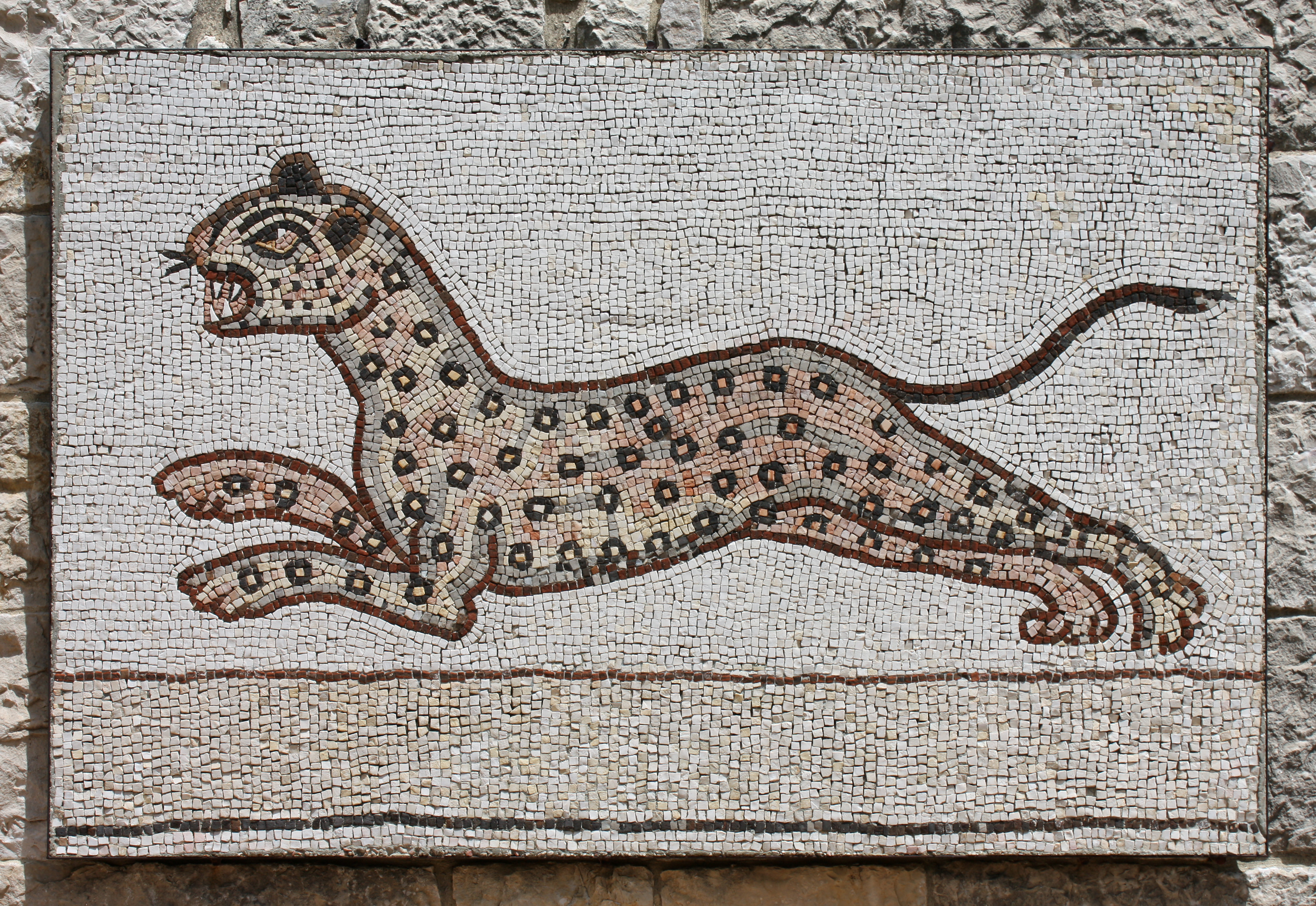
Leopard
