= Moussa Castle =

Castle in Lebanon

Coordinates: 33°42′02″N 35°35′01″E

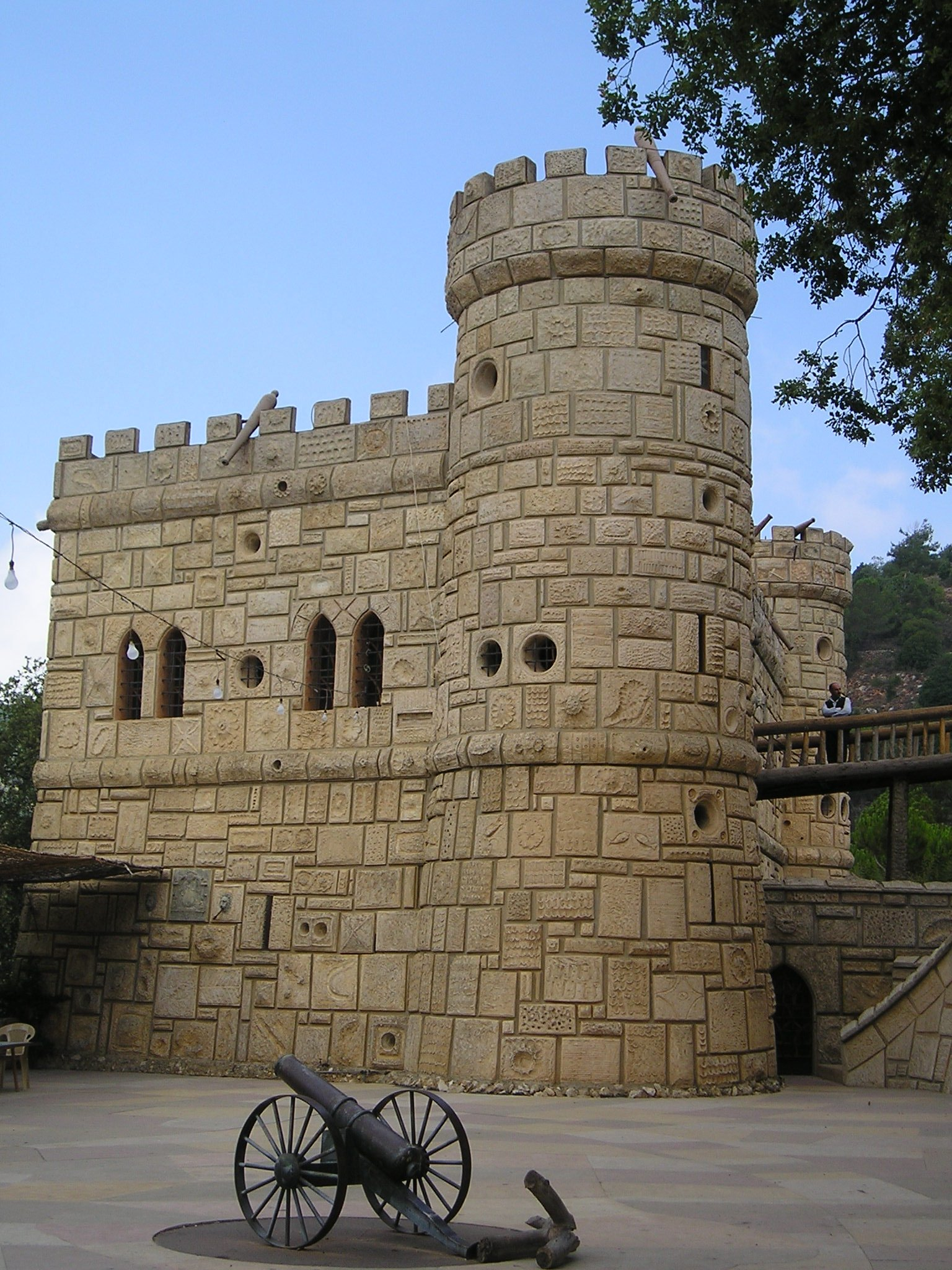
Moussa Castle

Moussa Castle (Arabic: قلعة موسى) is a castle between Deir el Qamar and Beit ed-Dine in Lebanon.

The 3,500 sq m (37,673 sq ft) castle was built by Moussa Abdel Karim Al Maamari, and was opened to the public in 1969.

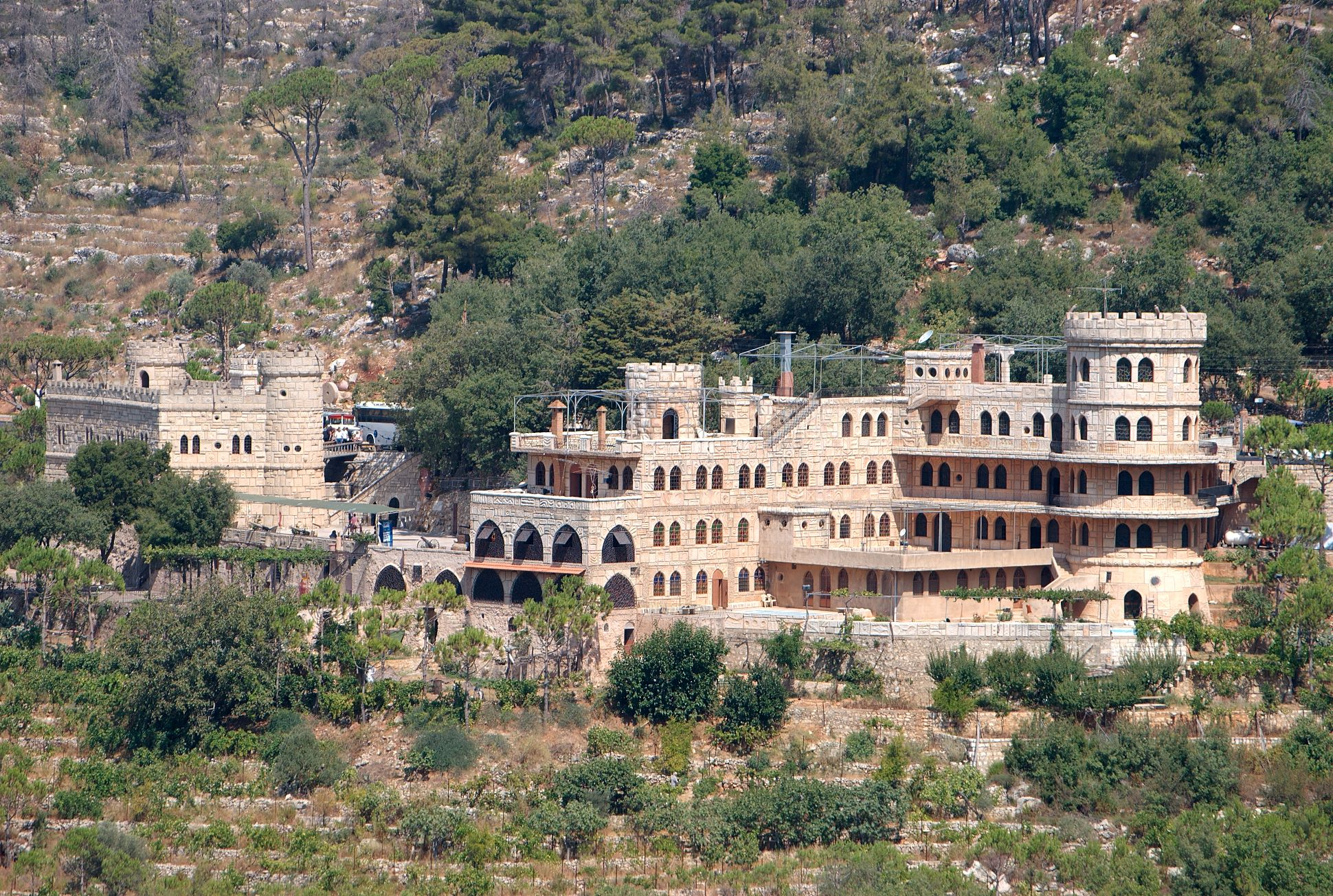

== History ==
Moussa's castle was built on a hill between Deir El Kamar and Beiteddine - Lebanon, with the beliefs and ideas of its builder engraved on its stones. The castle was built by Moussa Abdel Karim Al Maamari who was born on July 27, 1931, in the village of Harat Al Saraya - Lebanon and died January 31, 2018, in the village Deir El Qamar. His idea of building a castle began when he was only 14 years old, inspired by the Middle Ages.

Ridiculed by his teacher "Anwar" and mocked by his classmates, he left school and travelled to Saida on foot where he worked with his uncle on restoring Saida's fortress. He was later assigned by the Emir Maurice Chehab to renovate the castles and to excavate for archaeological discoveries to be exhibited in the National Museum of Beirut in 1947. He continued working in the same field gaining enough experience from his work in restoring castles. He was then transferred to Beiteddine palace, where he restored the museum of Emir Bashir Chehabi II; he supervised the work as well as the placing of the Emir's weapons collection, clothes and jewelry, and the sword offered to him by Napoleon in the museum that was inaugurated under the rule of late president Beshara Khalil Al Khoury in September 1951. It was then that he began work on his own construction and bought a suitable piece of land. The foundation stone was laid in 1962, and completed with the help of his wife.

== See also ==
- Moussa Al-Maamari
