= Beiteddine Palace =

Coordinates: 33°41′46.39″N 35°34′47.76″E

- قصر بيت الدين (Arabic)
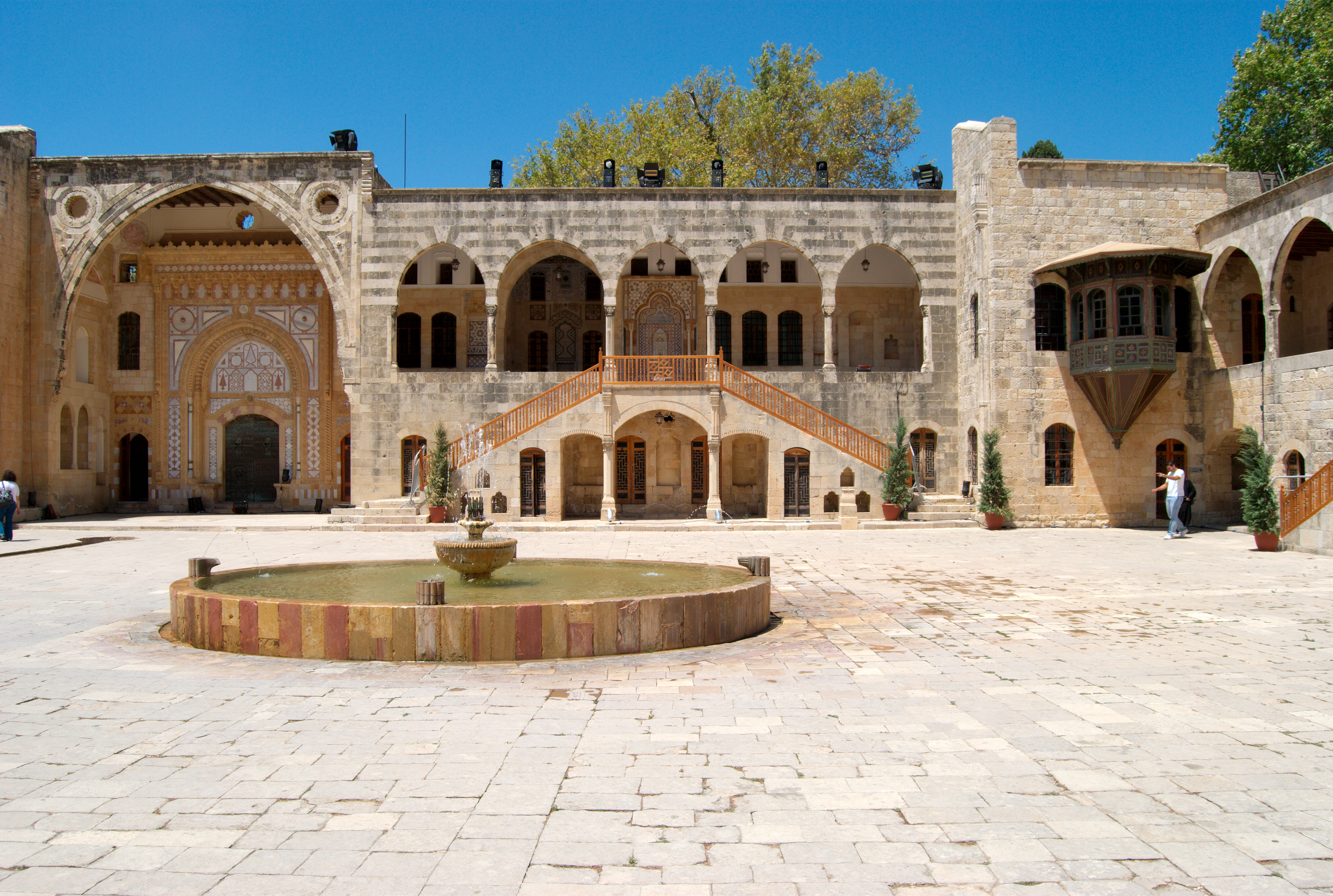
- Beiteddine Palace - Inner Courtyard
- Interactive map of Beiteddine Palace
- Location: Beiteddine, Lebanon

History
- Built: 1788-1818

Site notes
- Architectural style: 18th century Lebanese architecture

Beiteddine Palace (Arabic: قصر بيت الدين, romanized: Qaṣr Bayt ad-Dīn) is an 18th-century palace in Beiteddine, Lebanon, built by Bashir II. The palace hosts the annual Beiteddine Festival and the Beiteddine Palace Museum. and is also the residence of the President of Lebanon during the summer.

== History ==
Emir Bashir II of the Shihab dynasty, who later became the ruler of the Mount Lebanon Emirate, built the palace between 1788 and 1818 at the site of the Druze hermitage. After 1840, the palace was used by the Ottomans as a government building. During the French Mandate it served as a local administrative office.

In 1943, the palace was declared the president's official summer residence. During the Lebanese Civil War it was heavily damaged. Parts of the palace are today open to the public while the rest is still the president's summer residence.

A gathering of troops here for an incursion into Syria under Ibrahim Pasha is recorded in the notes to Letitia Elizabeth Landon's poetical illustration The Gathering of the Chieftains at Beteddein. to an engraving of a painting (showing the palace) by William Henry Bartlett in Fisher's Drawing Room Scrap Book, 1839.

UNESCO gave the palace enhanced protection during the 2024 Israeli invasion of Lebanon to safeguard against damage; it was one of 34 cultural sites to receive enhanced protection.

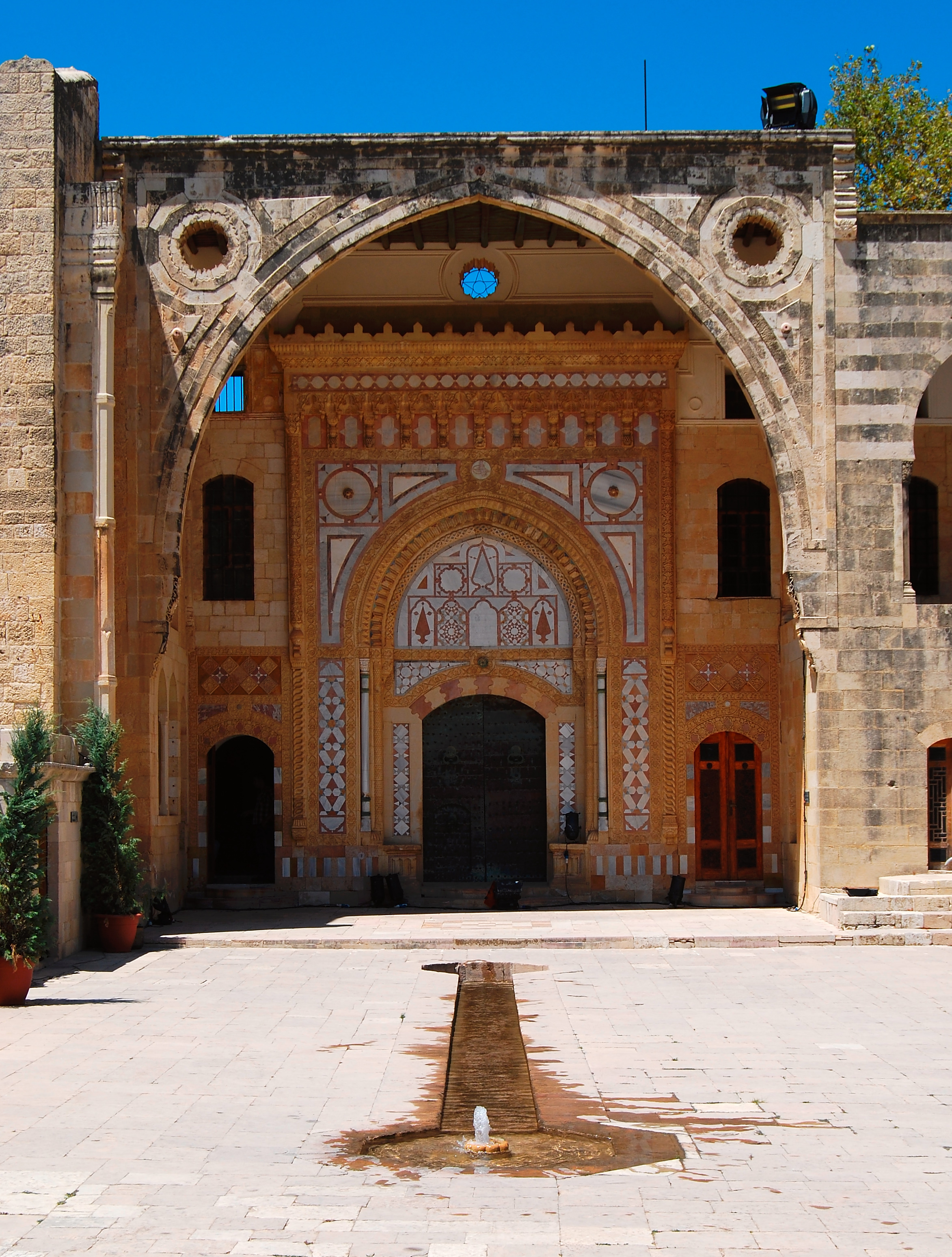
The entrance door

== Description ==
The Beiteddine Palace is recognized as a fine illustration of Lebanese architecture from the early 19th century, with notable Italian influences.

The palace's main entrance leads to a 107x45 meter courtyard. Along the right side of this court is a two-story wing, Al-Madafa, which was once used for receiving guests.

The entrance to the central section of the palace, Dar El Wousta, is from a double stairway at the far western end of the courtyard. From this point on, the impressive but austere appearance of the outside court and buildings gives way to the delightful architecture featuring beautiful arcades, mandaloun balconies, fountains, facades, rooms with carved and painted cedar wood embellished with Arabic calligraphy, antique furniture, inlaid marble and fine mosaics. These rooms served as offices and receptions salons.

At the far end of this courtyard rise the private apartments, Dar el Harim, composed of a large and richly decorated façade, the Upper Harem, the selamlik, the Lower Harem and the kitchens.

At the northern edge of the Dar El Harim section is the hammam.

Beyond the hammam is the tree-shaded tomb of Emir Bashir Shehab II and his first wife.

== Gallery ==
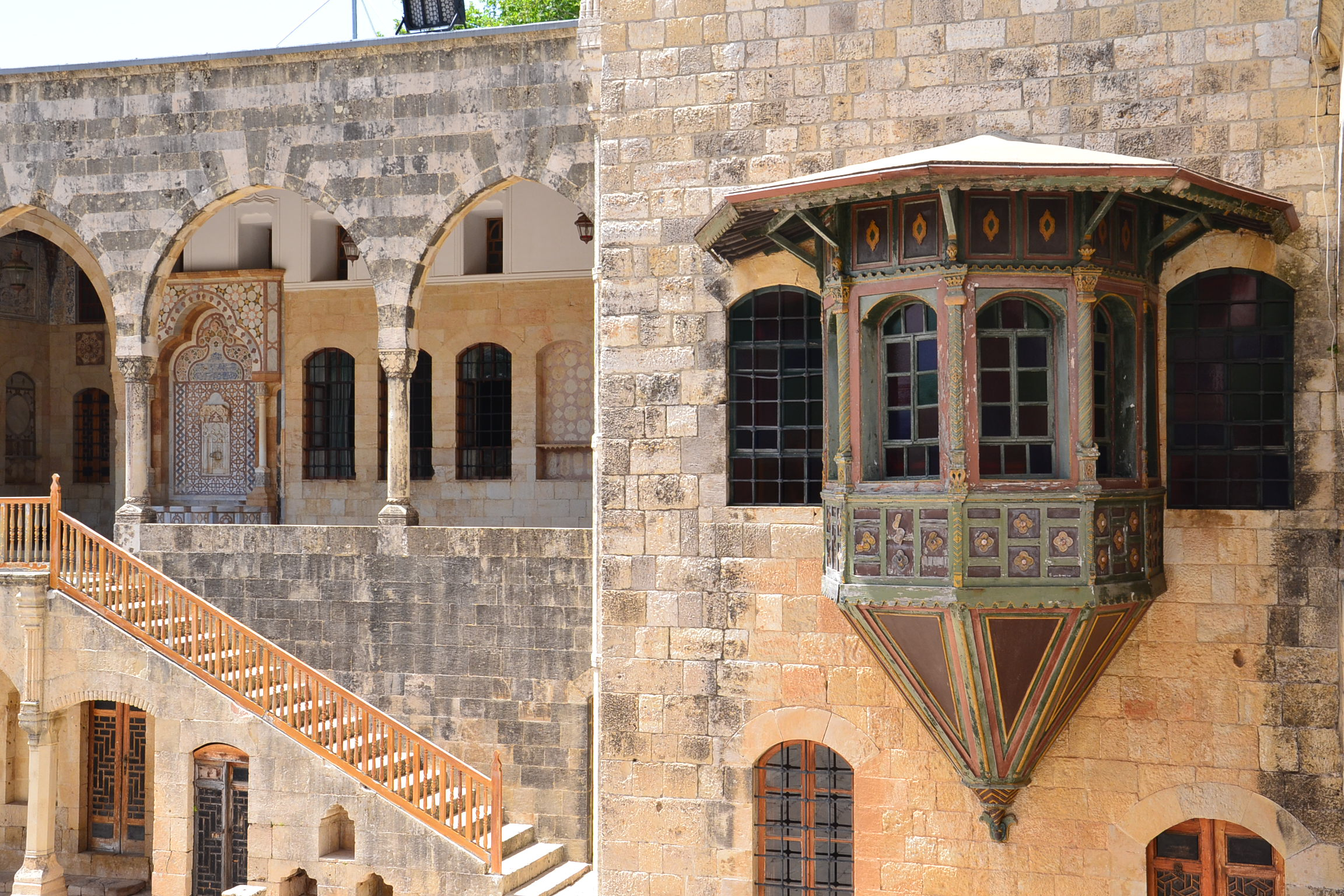
Latticework balcony closed in by intricate woodwork

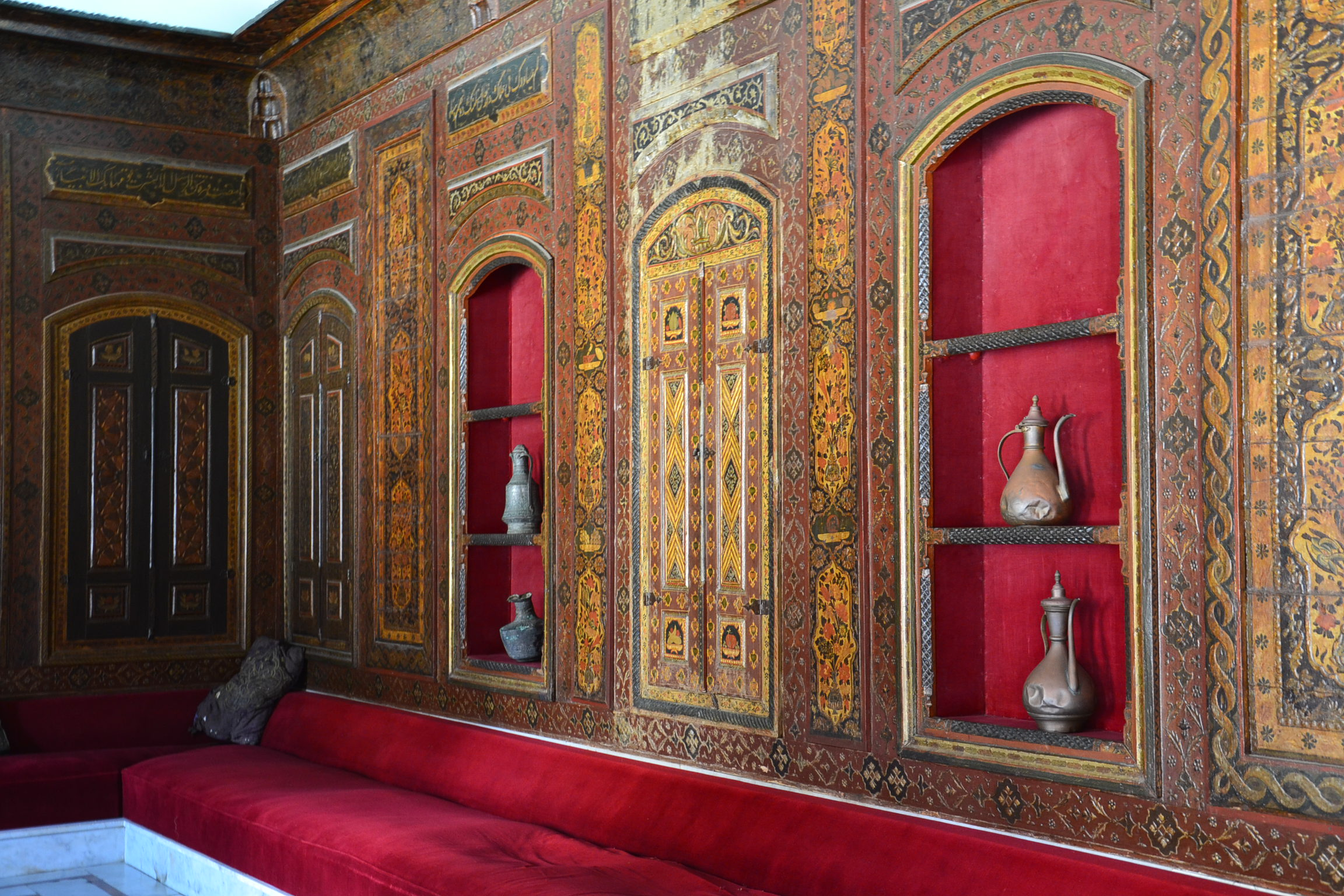
Carved cedar wood

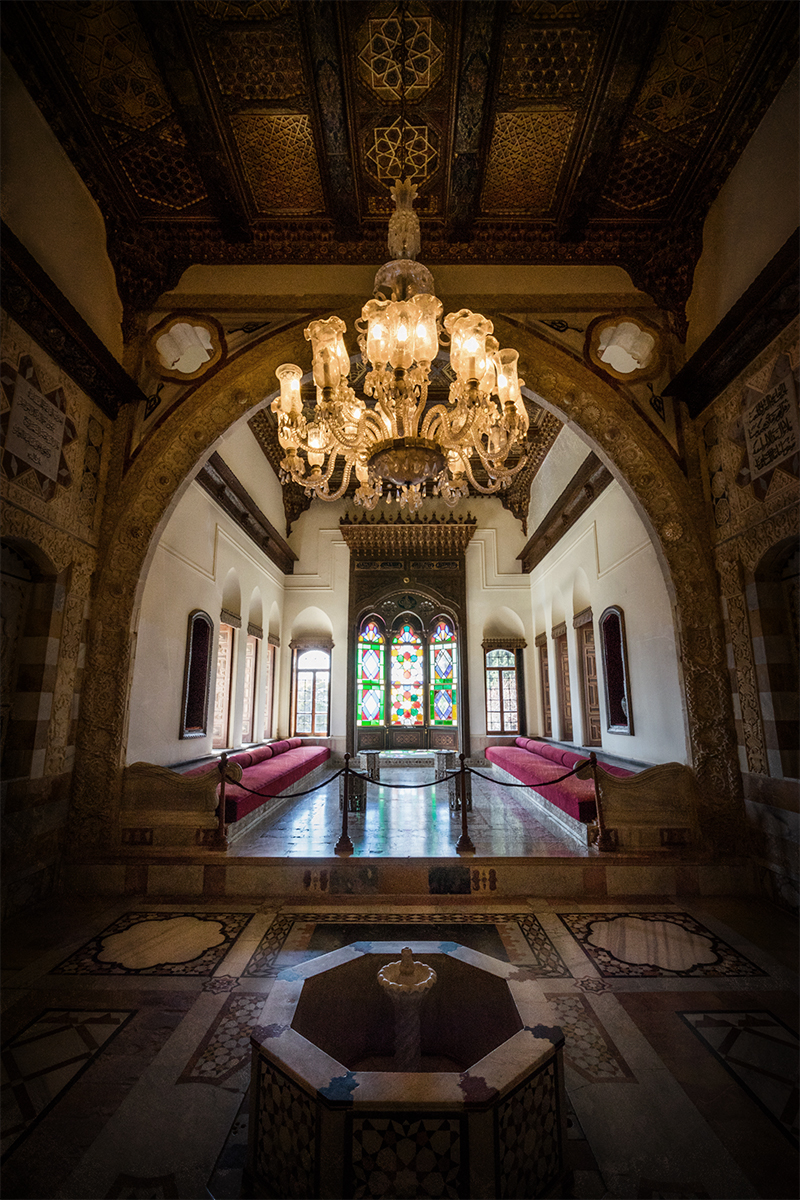
Internal Hall

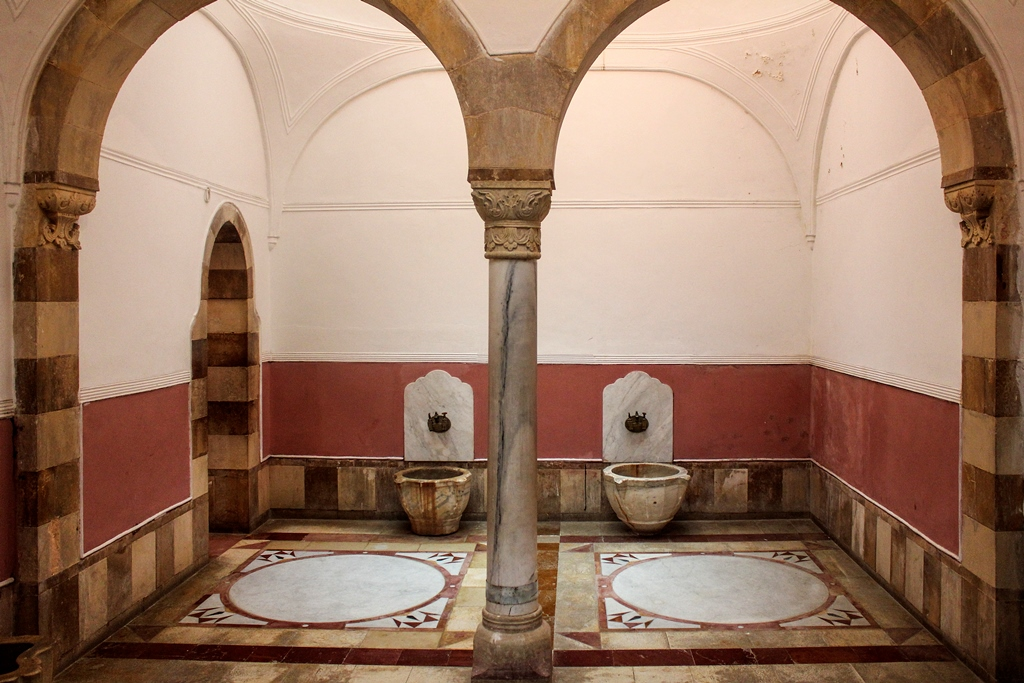
Baths

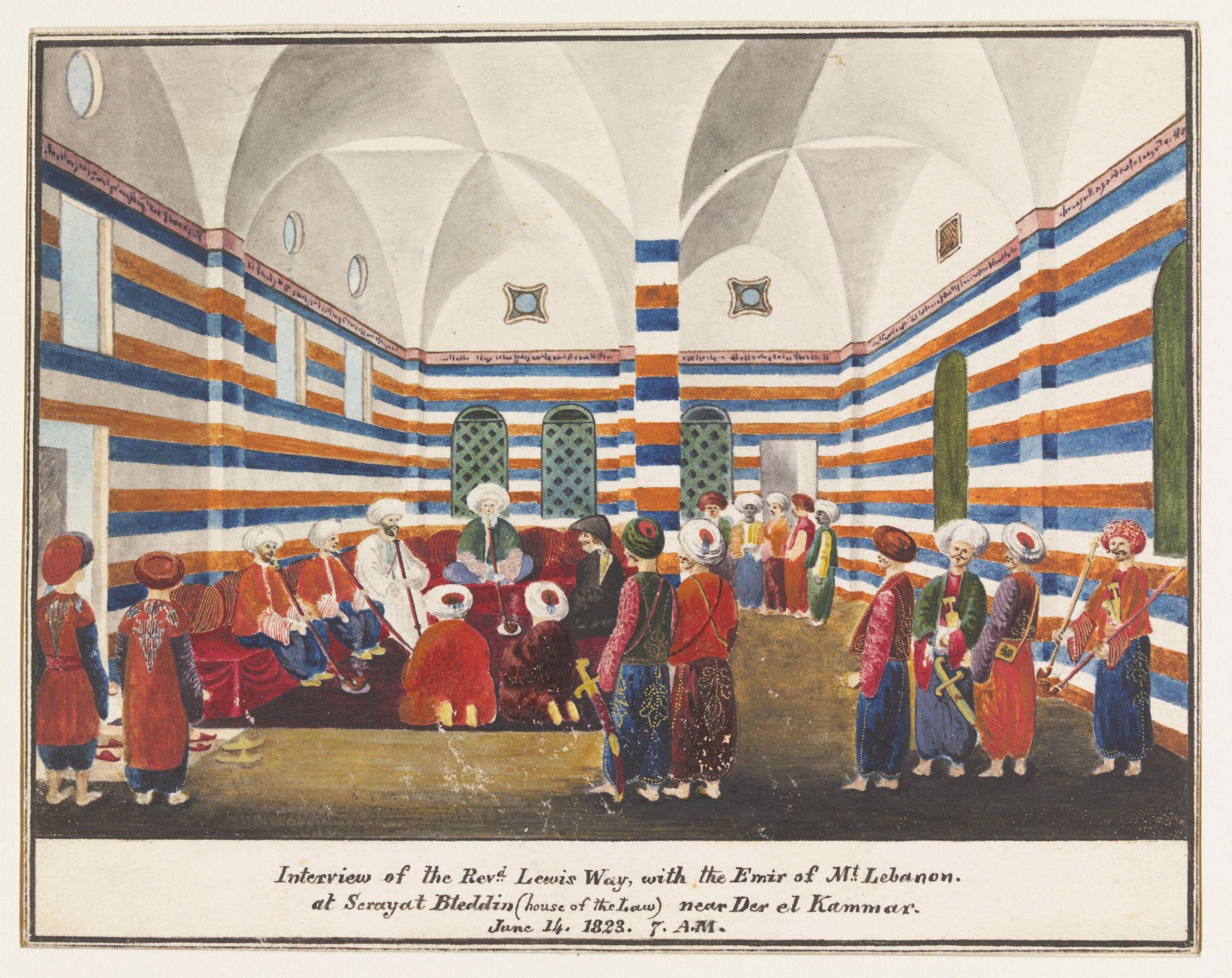
Interview of the Revd. Lewis Way, with the Emir of Mt. Lebanon, by Albert Way (1823)

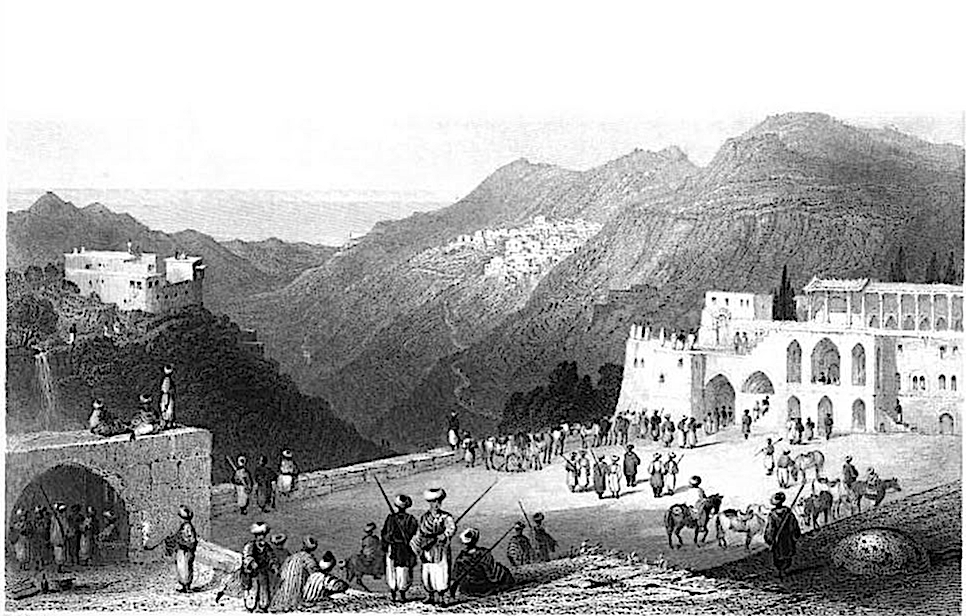
Beteddein, Palace of the Prince of the Druses, Artist: W. H. Bartlett - Engraved by: W. Floyd (1838)
