= Jiyeh Power Station oil spill =

2006 environmental disaster in the Mediterranean sea

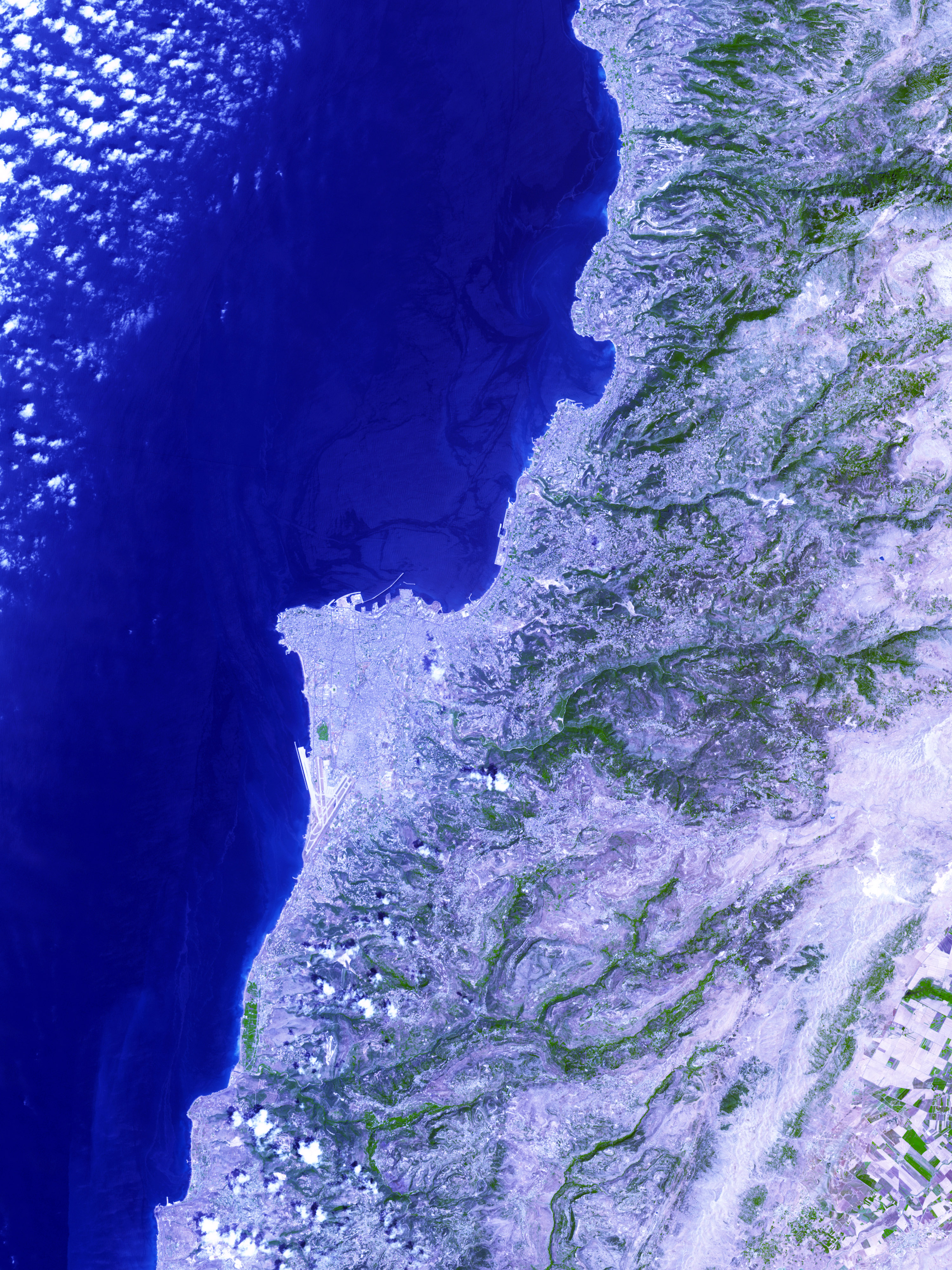
Nasa image of spill, taken August 10, 2006. Oil slick in darker blue.

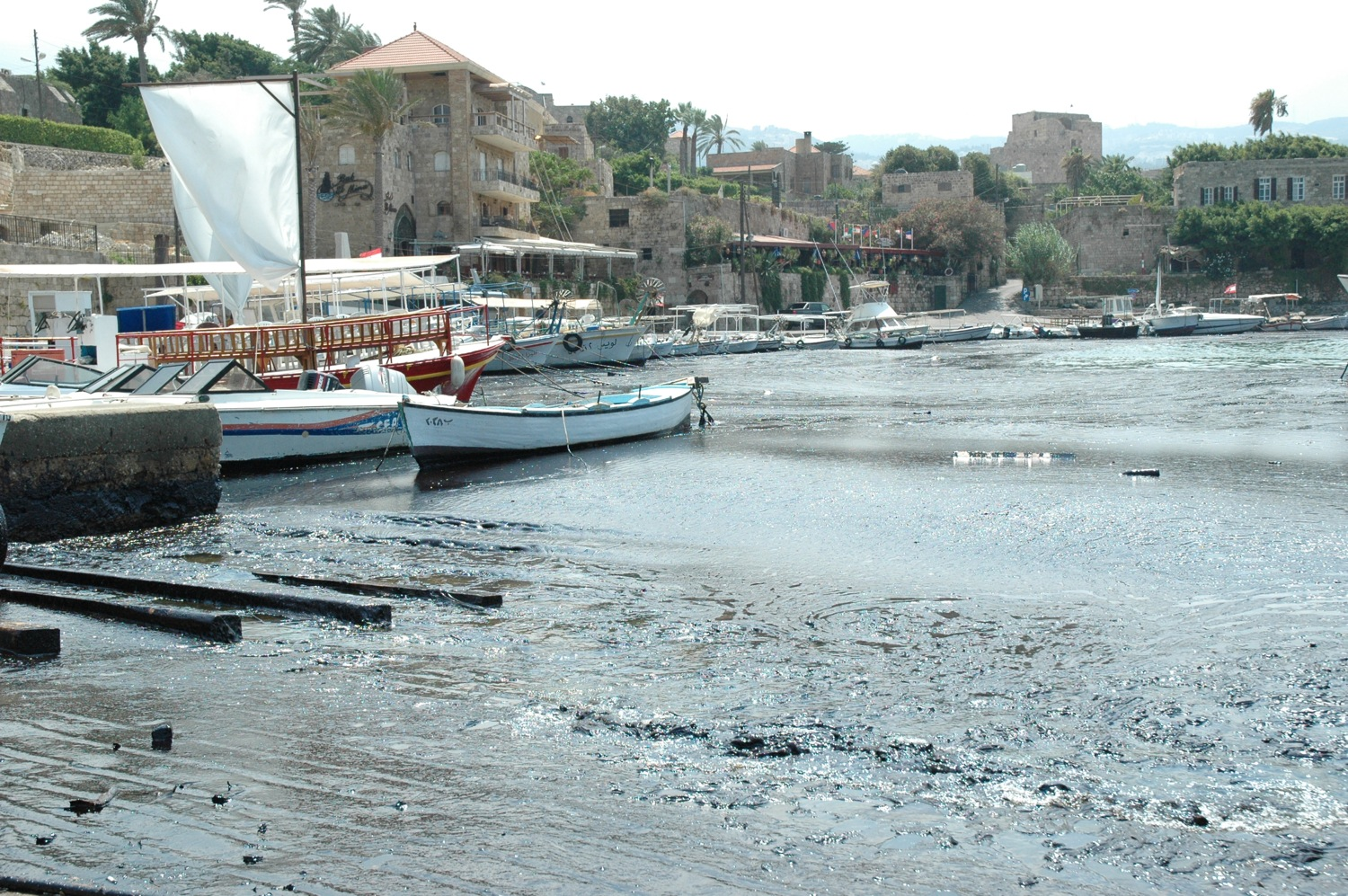
The oil-polluted water washing into the harbour of Byblos.

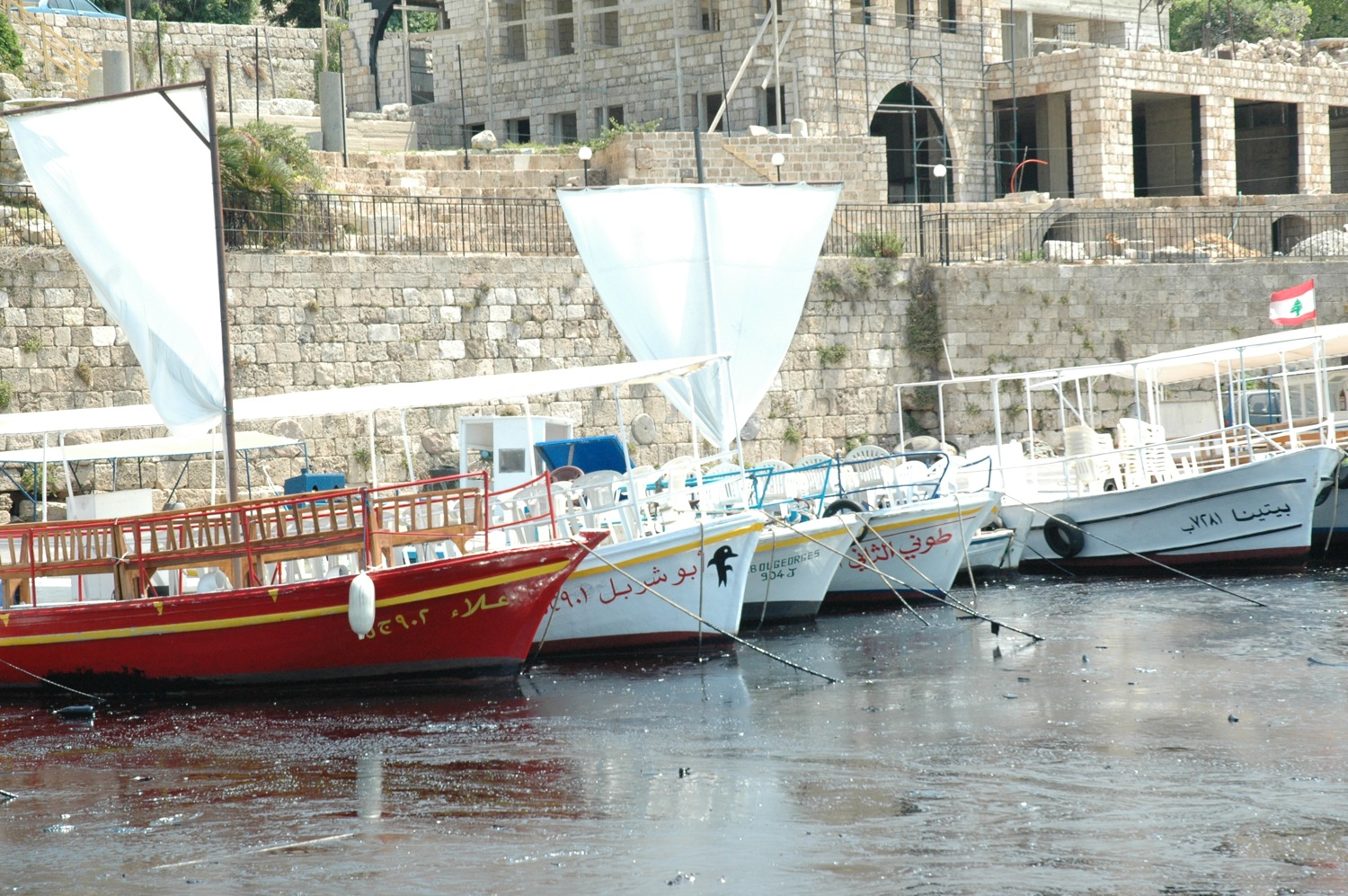
The oil spillage caused by the Jiyeh bombings in mid July, had by 29 July coated the whole water surface in Byblos harbour, some 60 km north of Jiyeh.

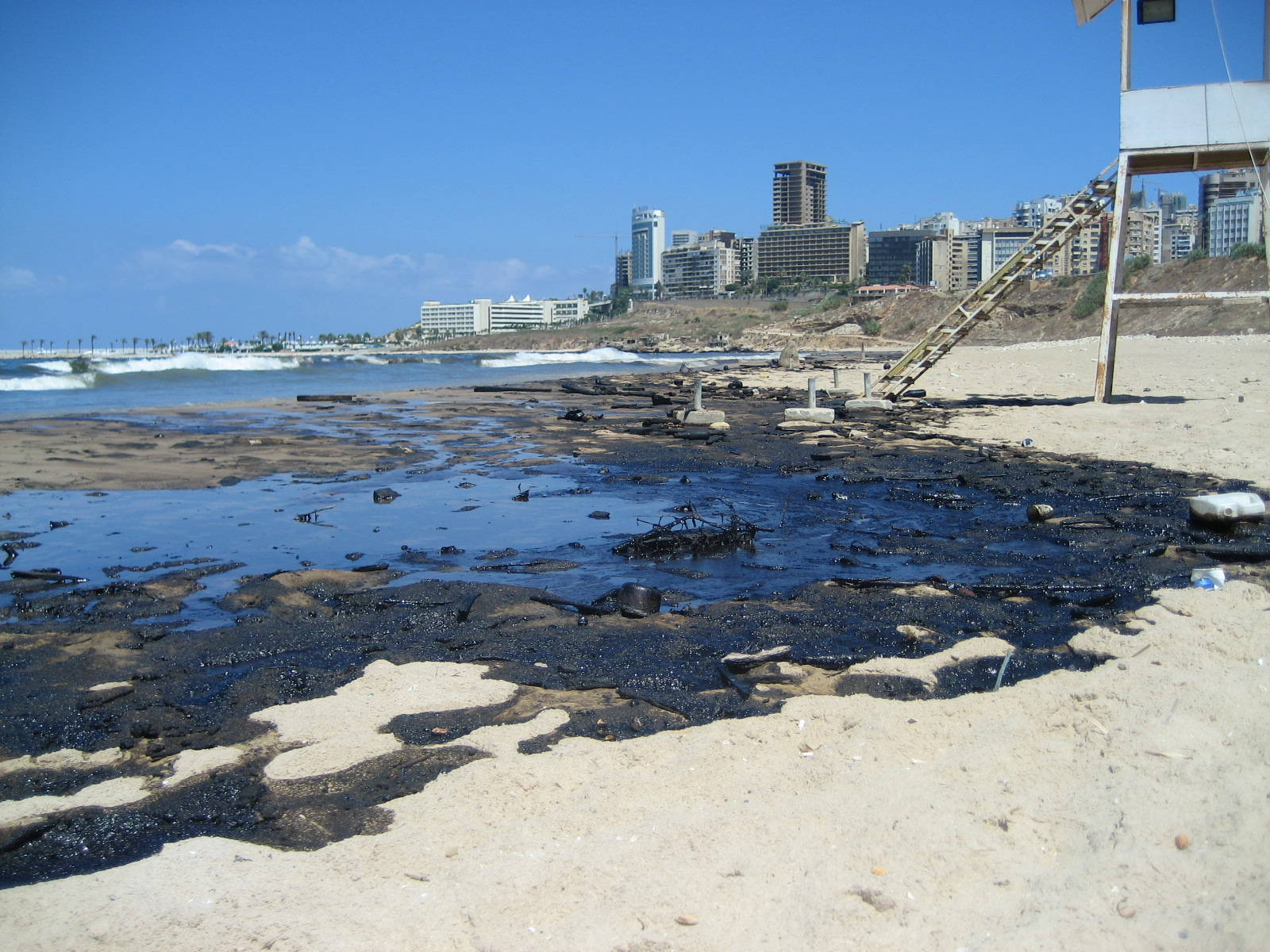
Oil from the bombed power plant of Jieh contaminating the beaches of Beirut

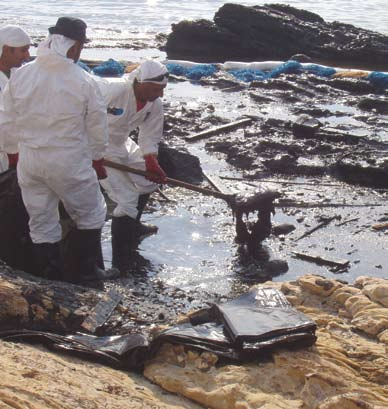
Workers clean up oil spill in 2006

The Jiyeh Power Station oil spill was an environmental disaster caused by the release of heavy fuel oil into the eastern Mediterranean after storage tanks at the thermal power station in Jiyeh, Lebanon, 30 km (19 mi) south of Beirut, were bombed by the Israeli Air force on July 14 and July 15, 2006 during the 2006 Israel-Lebanon conflict. The plant's damaged tanks leaked up to 30,000 tonnes of oil into the eastern Mediterranean Sea, A 10 km wide oil slick covered 170 km of coastline, and threatened Turkey and Cyprus. The slick killed fish, threatened the habitat of endangered green sea turtles, and potentially increased the risk of cancer.

Although Al Jazeera compared the scale of the oil spill to that of the Exxon Valdez oil spill, later assessment found that the volume spilled was 15 000 - 30 000 tonnes compared to 42 000 tonnes for the Exxon Valdez oil spill. The coastline affected was between 150–170 km, while the Exxon Valdez oil spill affected 2,100 km of coastline.

According to Lebanon's Environment Minister Yacoub Sarraf, Israeli jets deterred firemen from putting out the fire at the storage units, which continued for 10 days, and the Israeli Navy blockade stopped Lebanese and foreign officials from surveying the damage of the spill.

== Effects ==
The spill affected one-third of Lebanon's coastline. Beaches and rocks were covered in a black sludge up to Byblos, north of Beirut and extended into the southern parts of Syria. The slick killed fish, and threatens the habitat of the endangered green sea turtle as well as the endangered logger head sea turtle.

- On 31 July the United Nations Environment Programme (UNEP) expressed its "grave concern" about oil pollution in Lebanese coastal waters. The oil slick was at the time reported to cover one third of the coastline (10 miles) and it was considered possible that the eventual slick could reach 35,000 tons of oil. Malta-based Regional Marine Pollution Emergency Response Centre (REMPEC) for the Mediterranean, which advised the Lebanese government, reportedly said "a very small quantity of tar balls" also reached the Syrian coast in the north. The UNEP later revised those concerns and has stated that long-term damage from this incident has been avoided. Already in 2007, one year after the spill, the UNEP published a report that indicated that the regularly occurring anthropogenic stress from untreated sewage, boating and other activities is a greater stress on the Lebanese marine environment than the oil spill. The report indicated that the disposal of the waste from the temporary storage during the cleanup was only major issue remaining.
- The Lebanese Environment Minister said, "Up until now 20,000 to 30,000 tons heavy fuel oil have spilled out into the sea," "Until now, the worst ecological disasters have taken place in the oceans and it's the first time that an oil spill has happened outside the open sea," "We can have no illusions." "If nothing is done, not only will currents flowing towards the north mean that one third of Lebanon's coastline be hit, but also Cyprus, Syria, Turkey, Greece and even Israel," "The fauna and the Mediterranean ecosystem risk suffering badly and certain species are threatened with extinction," "I have appealed to Britain, Italy, Spain, the United States, all the countries which have already suffered oil slicks to ask for technical assistance as we cannot act on our own," Lebanese Environment Minister Yacub Sarraf said.

== International response ==
- Kuwait - They have sent 40 tons of material to thicken the oil and oil absorbing products.
- Israel - Damage assessment and cleanup operations were delayed by four weeks while Israel continued its bombing campaign.

=== United Nations ===
The United Nations General Assembly passed a resolution by 170 votes to 6 (Australia, Canada, Israel, Marshall Islands, Palau, and United States voting against) calling upon Israel to assume responsibility for compensation for the costs of repairing the environmental damage and restoration of the marine environment.

In the United Nations Second Committee where the draft resolution was discussed, the United States explained its opposition in terms of its one-sided and inappropriate nature, while Canada felt that "the General Assembly was not the appropriate forum to address questions of legal liability or compensation of the cost of repairing environmental damage". Israel objected to the omission of any mention of "the entire reason for the conflict", namely that "Hizbollah terrorists had crossed an internationally recognized border into Israel and kidnapped and killed Israeli soldiers", as well as the lack of concern for the "half a million trees and 52,000 dunams of forest that had burnt down in Israel as a result of fires caused by Hizbollah rockets; the 25 Israeli cement and asbestos buildings that had been damaged, polluting an area of 20,000 square metres; or the direct hit by a Katyusha rocket on a sludge-thickening plant in Tzafat."

The estimate by the UN of the cost of the oil spill in terms of harm to the Lebanese economy and cleaning up operations is $203 million. Israel has refused to answer any request for compensation.

Following this there was a precise rerun of the discussion and vote in December 2007, with the Australia, Canada, the Marshall Islands, Nauru, Palau and the United States coming out again against a General Assembly Resolution requesting Israel to take responsibility. In its defence the ambassador from Israel said the failure to mention the environmental catastrophes in Israel (half a million trees on fire), as well as the entire cause of the conflict (Hizbollah crossing the southern border of Lebanon to kidnap Israeli soldiers) proved that the resolution was an act of political demonization.

== Media awareness ==
A documentary by Hady Zaccak called The Oil Spill in Lebanon won first prize at the European and Mediterranean Film Festival on the TV of the Sea.

== Clean-up effort ==
The Lebanon Ministry of Environment, with the help of many donor countries and non-profit organizations, has been working on the clean-up effort. This includes legal issues, such as compensation, which is being dealt with through the United Nations General Assembly. The government of Israel has still, to this day, not compensated the government of Lebanon for the damage that was done. The requests of compensation from the United Nations to the government of Israel went unanswered. The objective of the entire project is to manage the environmental catastrophe by attaining funds to complete the clean-up. The total amount that was raised by donor countries and organizations was $2,919,400. Cleanup work was funded by the country of Japan through the UNDP and by the country of Norway through the Higher Relief Commission in Lebanon. Expenditures between the years of 2006 and 2007 where estimated to be around $1,835,587. The clean-up effort included the Dalieh Fishermen's wharf and three sites between Jadra and Ras al Saadiyat and three sites between Jieh and Beirut. Surveys of the coasts from Southern to Northern Lebanon took place in coordination with surveys of the underwater shorelines. A comprehensive shoreline survey of the catastrophic oil spill was put into action from the southern city of Tyre to the northern border of Lebanon, and it was undertaken between the months of November and December 2008, with funding from the International Development Agency of the Canadian government through UNDP in coordination with the Ministry of the Environment of Lebanon and under its technical supervision. The findings were finally, and with long anticipation, published by the United Nations in September 2009. Minor and pre-final clean-up activities at about 12 sites along the Lebanese coast, with a total length of approximately 7.5 kilometers, were quickly put into play and monitored by the Ministry of the Environment of the government of Lebanon.

A waste management project was also put in place in order to safely collect and transport the polluting material from the shorelines to temporary storage sites. The most recent United Nations report was published on August 7, 2009. This was the final report made by the United Nations General Assembly. The General Assembly decided to establish an Eastern Mediterranean Oil Spill Restoration Trust Fund, based on contributions from donor countries and organizations, to provide assistance and support to the States directly and adversely affected in their management of an environmentally sound sea and wildlife, from clean-up process to safe disposal of the oily waste that is on the shorelines, of this environmental disaster caused by the destruction of the oil storage tanks at the Jieh electric power plant in Lebanon.
