= Beiteddine Festival =

Annual event in Beiteddine, Lebanon

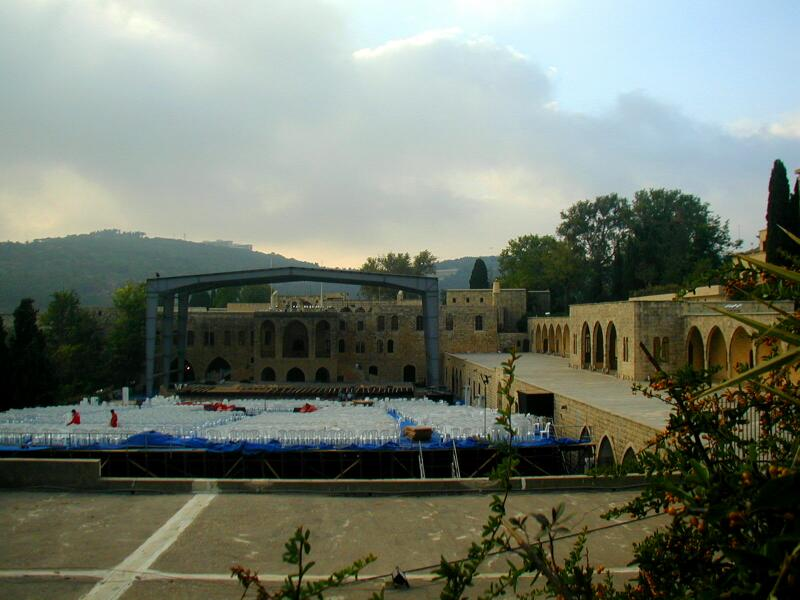
Beiteddine Festivals - Building a stage for a concert in the Outer Courtyard of Beiteddine Palace

The Beiteddine Festival (Arabic: مهرجان بيت الدين) is an annual summer festival that takes place in Beiteddine Palace in Beiteddine, Lebanon. It was launched amidst war and destruction in the middle of the 80's. It came as an act of faith in Lebanon's cultural specificity and its power of creativity and artistic freedom. It was a call for normality in the middle of the chaos and madness of the civil war.

== The Palace ==
The festival takes place in the 200-year-old Beiteddine Palace in the Chouf Mountains, in Lebanon.

== Festival highlights ==
- Roberto Alagna
- Kadim Al Sahir
- Charles Aznavour
- George Benson
- Caracalla Dance Theatre
- Mariah Carey
- José Carreras
- Phil Collins
- Plácido Domingo
- Montserrat Caballé
- Juan Diego Flores
- Anna Netrebko
- Majida El Roumi
- Fairuz
- Garou
- Gilberto Gil
- Sylvie Guillem
- Elton John
- Patricia Kaas
- Marcel Khalifé
- Diana Krall
- Ricky Martin
- Katie Melua
- Joss Stone
- Il Divo
- Notre-Dame de Paris
- UB40

== See also ==
- Culture of Lebanon
