= Jieh =

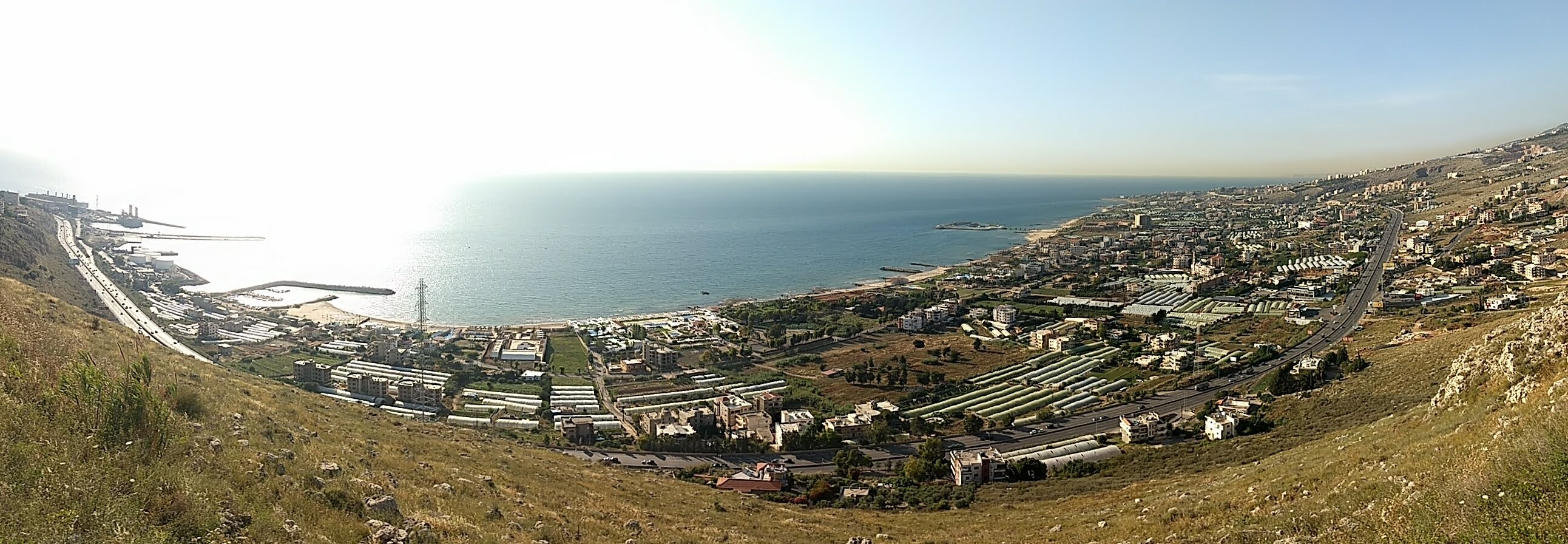
Jiyeh الجية Jieh Panoramic May 2018
- City
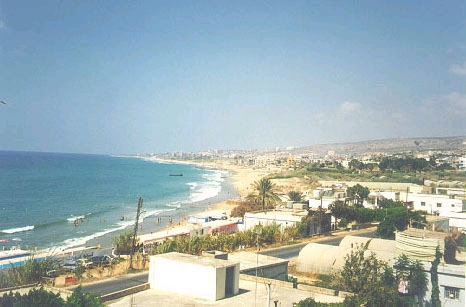
- Jieh coastline

- Location within Lebanon
- Coordinates: 33°39′56.51″N 35°25′36.46″E
- Country: Lebanon
- Governorate: Mount Lebanon
- District: Chouf

Government
  - Mayor: Wissam Azzi
- Elevation: 0 m (0 ft)
- Time zone: UTC+2 (EET)
  - Summer (DST): UTC+3 (EEST)
- Dialing code: +961

Jieh (or Jiyé, Jiyeh, Levantine Arabic: الجية, romanized: al-Jiyeh) is a seaside town in Lebanon with an estimated population of 5000, 23 km south of Beirut, in the Chouf District via a 20-minute drive along the Beirut to Sidon highway south of the capital. In Phoenician times, it was known as Porphyreon and was a thriving natural seaport, which still functions today. The town is also known for its seven-kilometre sandy beach, which is a rarity along Lebanon's rocky coastline.

== History ==
The Biblical prophet Jonah was said to have landed on its shores when he was spat out of the giant fish described in the Hebrew Bible, and a temple was built which stands until today. Many invaders passed through Porphyreon such as Tohomtmos the Egyptian who landed his soldiers on its natural seaport in order to fight the North. Alexander the Great relaxed on its shore preparing for the attack on Tyre. St. Peter and St. Paul also walked through Jieh several times.

In modern times Jieh took some of the harshest blows of the Lebanese Civil War that raged from 1975 to 1990. Being a coastal town made it vulnerable to the countless numbers of Palestine Liberation Organization raids on the area, as well as Israeli army invasions during the 1980s, the worst being on January 20, 1976. Jieh's strategic location on the coastal highway between Beirut and Sidon made it a recurring site of conflict and demographic shifts.

In January 1976, during the "Two-Year War" phase, the town was the site of a major massacre committed by Joint Forces units comprising the Palestine Liberation Organization (PLO) and the Lebanese National Movement (LNM). Following the fall of the nearby town of Damour, armed groups entered Jieh, resulting in the summary execution of approximately 50 to 100 Christian civilians and the displacement of the remaining population.

In January 1984, during the Mountain War, the town and the surrounding Iqlim al-Kharrub region were the site of the "Iqlim al-Kharrub Coastal Massacre." Following the withdrawal of the Israel Defense Forces (IDF) from the coastal road, a series of clashes resulted in the capture of several villages by militias. During this period, approximately 30 to 40 civilians in Jieh and neighboring coastal settlements were killed in localized massacres, and several thousand residents were displaced toward the south.

Following the IDF withdrawal from the Sidon area in March 1985, a coalition of the Progressive Socialist Party (PSP), the Amal Movement, and Palestinian factions moved to secure the coastal corridor. This final phase of conflict in the area resulted in the summary execution of an estimated 15 to 20 Christian civilians and the total displacement of the town's remaining Christian population.

During the war, the Progressive Socialist Party controlled the seaport at Jieh. In March 1989, General Michel Aoun established a blockade of the port, which resulted in artillery exchanges between his forces and a combination of PSP, Lebanese Resistance Regiments, and the Syrian Army in Beirut and the Chouf. At least 90 people were killed and several hundred wounded. Jieh is being rebuilt, albeit at a slower pace than the nearby capital city of Beirut.

== Archaeological site ==
The town houses some of Lebanon's finest archaeological ruins, some of them buried under modern buildings, others waiting to be dug up by excavators, and others having already been removed and placed in museums. Mosaics depicting the story of the Prophet Jonah and the giant fish in the Book of Jonah have been found in churches dug from underground over time. Examples of these are the grand floor mosaics from the Byzantine Empire period, which were so big that trucks were needed to transport them to museums, as was the case with the fine collection owned by Walid Jumblatt, a local politician, which is on display at his Beiteddine Palace Museum.

Findings at the site indicate occupation from the Late Bronze Age through the early Islamic period. There is evidence for the production of wine and olive oil, as well as animal husbandry, in Late Antiquity. Stratigraphic, ceramic and numismatics data show that the settlement was abandoned in the 2nd half of the 7th century CE, without evidence for destruction or sudden termination.

During the 2024 Israeli invasion of Lebanon, UNESCO gave enhanced protection to 34 cultural sites including the Jiyeh – Porphyreon archaeological site to safeguard it from damage.

=== Research history ===
In 1914, Georges Contenau located the basilica, the residential quarter, and the necropolis. The first excavations on the site were carried out in 1975 by Roger Saidah from the Directorate General of Antiquities. They uncovered most of the domestic architecture from the Byzantine period. The outbreak of civil war in Lebanon interrupted the work. The mosaics found during these excavations are currently on display in the museum in Beiteddine. Since 2004, research in Jiyeh has been conducted by the Polish-Lebanese archaeological expedition from the Polish Centre of Mediterranean Archaeology University of Warsaw headed by Prof. Tomasz Waliszewski.

The Polish-Lebanese Archaeological Mission from the PCMA UW conducts its research in cooperation with the DGA and the Faculty of Conservation and Restoration of Works of Art of the Academy of Fine Arts, Warsaw. In 2004, salvage excavations were conducted due to the construction of a hotel in the area of the necropolis. The team documented graves from the Roman and Byzantine periods, as well as large numbers of Hellenistic and Roman pottery vessels, both imported and locally produced. In the following years, work focused on the basilica and the residential quarter. Test pits in the basilica confirmed its use in the 5th century, although it could have been built earlier, i.e., in the 4th century. About 100 rooms dated to the Roman and Byzantine periods were excavated in the residential quarter. Test pits dug in some of the houses revealed ancient layers, as well as earlier ones – from the Bronze and Iron Ages.

Three main phases of the functioning of the domestic architecture were distinguished:

1. Iron Age II (8th–7th century BC)
2. Persian-Hellenistic-Roman period (5th century BC–2nd century AD)
3. Late Antique period (4th–5th century AD)

The analysis of finds, mainly coins and ceramics, suggests that the settlement was abandoned in the 7th century.

A pottery production center and remains of a wine production installation were discovered to the north of the residential quarter. The economy of the settlement could have been based on trade in locally-produced goods, such as olive oil, wine, pottery vessels. Fishing was also practiced, as attested by the equipment discovered on the site: fishing hooks and net sinkers.

Jieh has recently been the scene of accidental excavations of a Byzantine-era Christian church and surrounding tombs which had been buried underground for centuries. Nothing is being done to protect them at the moment due to political hearings on the matters of the people versus the government - landlords' rights to preserve historical artifacts found on said property with viable direct ancestry value and or documentation. The people versus the government landlords' rights to preserve historical artifacts found on the said property which directly pertain to all local populous religious beliefs, practices, and or scriptures or text, all of which fall under the world preservation of historical and archaeological acts of 1971.

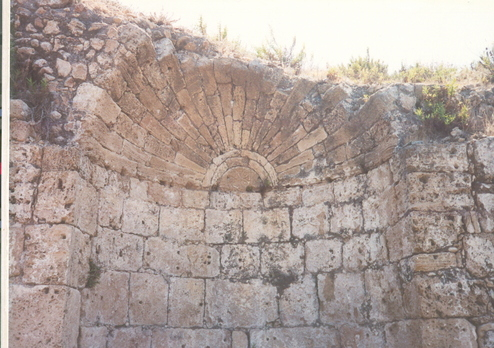
Ruins of Christian basilica

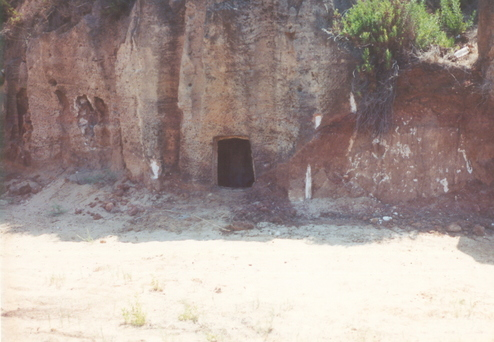
The grave

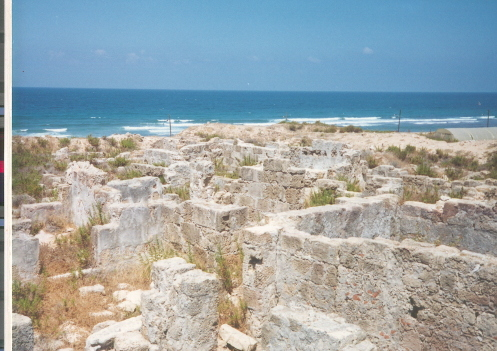
Ruins of multicultural settlements

== Religion ==
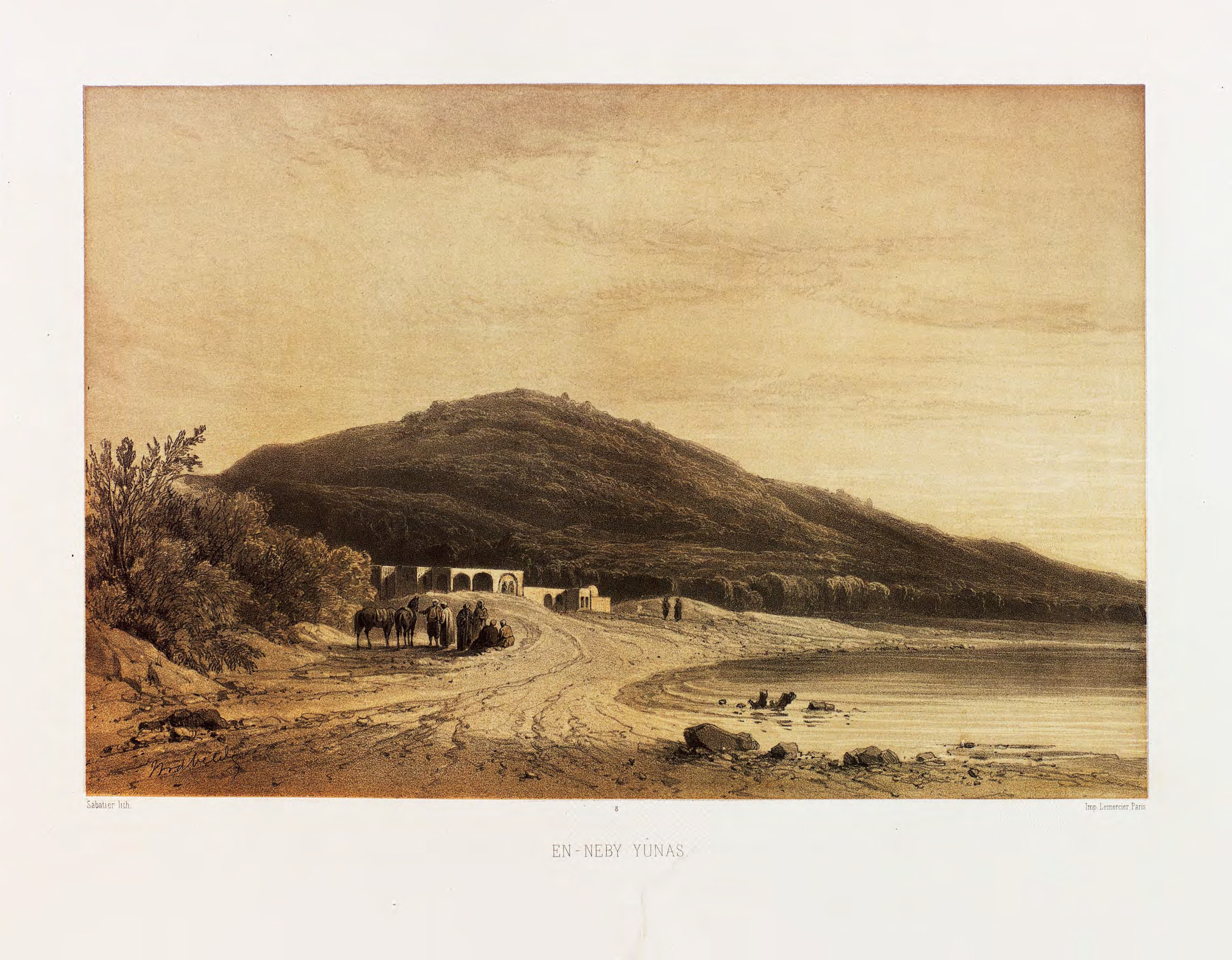
En Neby Yunas, ca 1851, by van de Velde

Jieh is home to many religious groups, mostly Maronite Christians and Shia Muslims with some Melkites, Druze and Sunni Muslims. The Shiite Muslims of this area mainly occupy the high rise section of Nabi Younes (Prophet Jonah) located in the central western and southern parts of the town on the coast. While the northern and central eastern area is occupied by the Christian and Sunni populous in the section of St. George's and Our Lady of the Star's Cathedrals. The rebuilding of Jieh's two churches took effect a few years after the civil war ended during the construction boom. On the left below is Our Lady of the Star, Maronite Catholic Church whose construction finished in 2017, as well as the new St Georges Church featured to the right.

Many Christian families who fled the town of Jieh have sent money back to rebuild Our Lady of the Star, which is now completed and regularly hosts weddings and other religious events. The rebuilding of St George's has also begun. While the original mosque of the town built directly over the tomb of the Nabi Younes to safe-guard the tomb, built around a century ago by the El Hajj family (one of the predominant Shia families in the village) still lies in ruins due to a dispute between Shia and Sunni factions on the placement and erection of the new facility. This has caused strife between all the religious denominations in the region. More now than ever since Hezbollah stepped into the middle of the dispute and erected a Shia mosque without finding a common ground between both Muslim parties and the consent on placement of the facility with the Christian denominations in the area to confirm that the voluminous call to prayers would not be a hindrance upon their religious practices.

Jieh also hosts many resorts that take advantage of the 7km of sandy beaches as well as the towns close proximity to Beirut that allows for many people staying in Beirut to easily visit for the day.

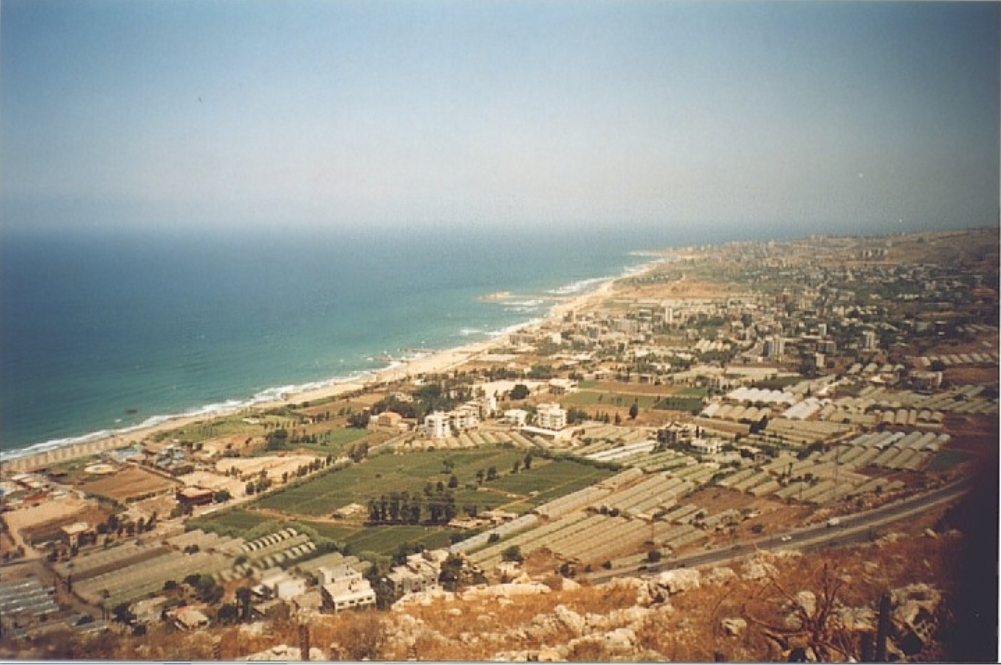
Jieh Scenic View, 2003

Our Lady of the Star Maronite Catholic Church under construction, November 2006

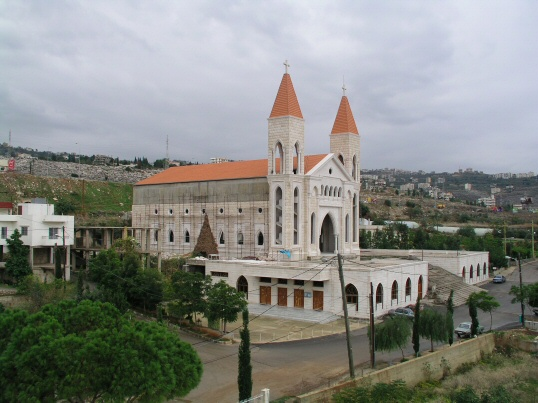
Our Lady of the Star Maronite Catholic Church

St Georges Maronite Catholic Church under construction, Dec 2007

On the 28 October 2010, St George's Catholic Cemetery was the subject of an attack by graveyard vandals. An exhumed body in the lone casket of one of the tombs was removed, dragged out of its resting place and disfigured.

== Tourism ==
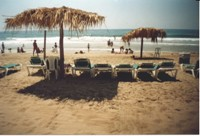
Bamboo Bay

Jieh's main tourist attraction is its 7 km sand strip hosting a set of clean sandy beaches. Close to Beirut and still clean to swim in, Jieh is a go-to destination for beach lovers who like the sand, the sun, and some waves away from the hustle and bustle of the city. The mainly privately owned beach resorts that occupy the beach front range in themes that cater for all classes of society, including women's only beaches.

== Education ==
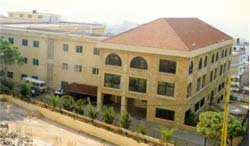
St Charbel College

Jieh is a town that houses St Charbel College. The convent of Saint Charbel and the attached High School are run by the Lebanese Maronite Order of Monks. It was the direct result of repeated demands by the local residents and two decades of planning and negotiations. Construction was completed in 1965. The mission of this project was to provide education to students of different faiths from Jieh and neighboring villages in the Chouf district south of Beirut. The convent and school were lightly damaged during the 1975 war and then evacuated in 1985 when the Christian population of the town was forced out. This time the structure sustained heavy damages and for the next six years became a living quarter for Palestinian refugees. Renovations started in 1991 after generous contributions from charitable organizations, local politicians and residents. As soon as the work was completed, 600 students enrolled of whom only 18 were Christians. Today both the convent and the school are fully restored and became a center of culture and education for students from the southern suburbs of Beirut to Sidon.

== Power ==
Jieh is home to Lebanon's largest and oldest thermal power plant. Located on the southern tip of Jieh's border with neighbouring town Wadi El Zeina, this power station houses 5 units; the first two Toshiba units having been installed in 1970, while the three remaining turbines from the Brown Boveri Company in Switzerland were put into service later on between 1980 and 1981. The Toshiba units produce 65MW while the Brown Boveri Company (BBC) units each produce 72MW of electricity, totalling 346MW for the Jieh plant when at full capacity. Although this is only the second highest total capacity after Zouk from Lebanon's 7 thermal power plants, it must be commended for being the first and only one from during the 1970s and mid 1980s until the first unit at Zouk was put into service in 1984.

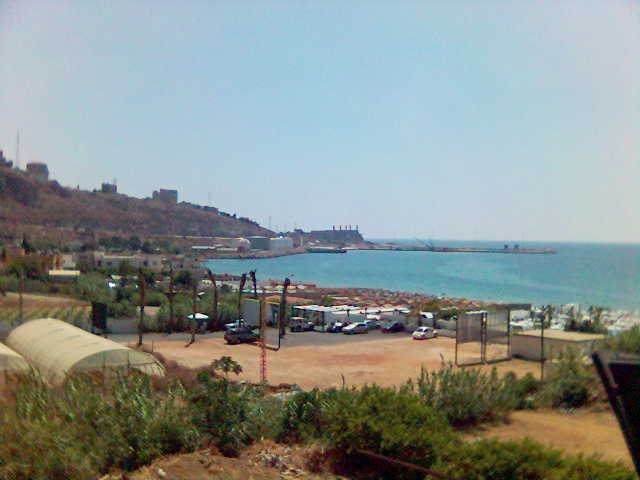
Gas station, Power Plant and wharf in the distance

The power station at Jieh was closed for a period after the Israeli invasion in 1982, and so technicians who came to repair the older Toshiba turbines were deterred away from the country due to kidnappings of foreigners and the raging of the civil war. Likewise, the three Brown Boveri turbines had managed to get some service from BBC's India technicians rather than from the Switzerland headquarters. This meant that only minor repairs could be done, and so the generators could not run at full capacity. In 1982, the Lebanese Pound fell by a factor of 600 and so Electricite du Liban, Lebanon's government owned power company, could not afford to buy spare parts from overseas for its power stations. Hundreds of communities and ghettos across the country also refused (and still refuse) to pay electricity bills that funded the maintenance. This, as well as significant electricity piracy, resulted in deteriorating conditions of the power plant at Jieh.

On 19 August 1997 the power station was hit by Israeli airstrikes. It was the culmination of a spike in violence which began the day before when two teenagers were killed by a roadside bomb near Jezzine. In response, 18 August, the South Lebanon Army had shelled Sidon, killing seven people. This led to Hezbollah firing a barrage of rockets into northern Israel and hence the airstrike.

On 23 July 1999 the Lebanese headquarters of the Cellis telephone company in Jeih was destroyed by an Israeli airstrike. The strike was part of two extensive air raids on 24/25 July which left Beirut without electricity, five bridges on the Beirut to Sidon road destroyed, as well as a radio station in Baalbek demolished. Eight Lebanese were killed and an estimated $52 million damage caused. Two Israeli were killed by Hezbollah rockets in Kiryat Shimona.

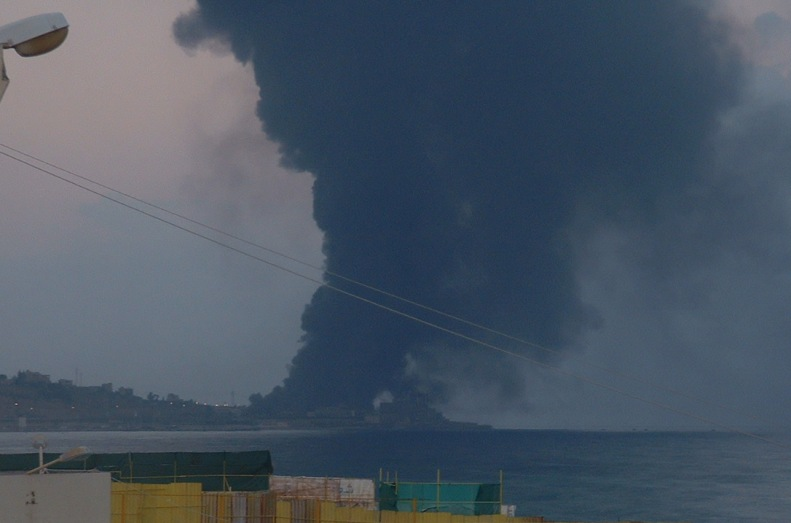
Smoke rising from the Jieh Power Station in the early hours of the morning straight after a missile attack on Friday July 14th, 2006.

Foreign investment, however, helped revive the plant numerous times until presently, although today the main problem is the lack of adequate fuel supply from the government that is needed to run the plant. Recent deals with the Arab states of the Persian Gulf have been sought to receive discounted fuel to ensure good supply to the power plants. According to current news articles, Jieh's power plant is undergoing extensive maintenance due to neighbouring Syria's recent cut of power supply to parts of Lebanon, meaning that the Jieh plant is on its way to full service again.

The July 2006 war between the Hezbollah and the Israeli Defence Forces resulted in the fuel stores at the power plant being bombed, leading to a catastrophic environmental disaster with crude oil spilling into the sea. On Friday July 14 at around 3am, the Jieh power plant was struck by missiles from navy destroyers off the Lebanese coast aimed at one of its six fuel tanks. It was hit once more the next day when two bridges on the main highway in Jieh were also destroyed by missile attacks. Ongoing black smoke continued to rise from the plant for weeks after the attack as the nearby tankers exploded one after the other from the heat while the remaining tens of thousands of litres of oil spilled endlessly into the Mediterranean sea.

== Environmental Problems ==
As a result of crude violations of the environment directly by the council of Barja up in the nearby mountains, the Jieh coastline has been subject to the continual release of unclean water through the Barja to Jieh sewerage canal. This canal routinely dumps Barja's human faeces and other liquid waste into Jieh's coastal waters and directly affects tourism and the environment in this town. There have also recently been plans to build a landfill in Jiyyeh. This has met some hard opposition by some government ministers and angry locals who don't want their town being turned into a garbage dump, and so at the moment the solution to the problem is not quite clear.

=== Jiyeh Power Station Oil Spill ===
The power station oil spill from a July 14-15th 2006 Israeli airstrike released over 16,000 tonnes of crude oil into the Mediterranean sea and threatened marine life along the coast of Lebanon, mainly from Jieh stretching as far north as Syria and Turkey.

=== Oil pollution from ships ===
See Oil pollution from ships in Zouk Mikael.

== Jieh Sub-districts ==
Jieh is divided locally into sub districts namely: Taht el Chir, Beit Madi, Beit Chahine, Haret el Kaneese, Qassouba, Nabi Younes, El Sahl & Maqsabe.

== Notes ==
1. Azzi, C., Technical Opinion On the proposed Landfill
2. Azzi, A., Jieh Through history Atallah Family Website
3. United Nations General Assembly Security Council, Letter dated 5 January 1988 from the Permanent Representative of Lebanon to the United Nations addressed to the Secretary-General
4. Jieh Online, 30 Year Anniversary
5. The story of the Prophet Jonah and the giant fish
6. Pictures of Byzantine church excavations, Dec 2004
7. Bamboo Bay Jieh, 360° Panoramic View
8. $8 million new resort near Beirut - 5/20/2005
9. College St Charbel (French)
10. Electricite du Liban information about Lebanon's power plants
11. Lebanese ration power after Syria cuts off supplies
12. Daily Star Article: 'Lebanon will drown in solid waste'
13. Greenpeace "Right To Know" tour calls for a toxics use and release inventory on chemical-use by industries in Lebanon
14. Grave robbers raid cemetery in Jiyeh

== See also ==
- List of extrajudicial killings and political violence in Lebanon

== Sources ==
=== Bibliography - archaeology ===
- Mariusz Gwiazda, Economy of Hellenistic, Roman and Early Byzantine Settlement in Jiyeh (Porphyreon), Lebanon, dx.doi.org, 2 marca 2017
- Urszula Wicenciak, Porphyreon. Hellenistic and Roman pottery production in the Sidon hinterland (=Polish Archaeology in the Mediterranean Monograph Series 7). Warszawa: PCMA 2016
- Tomasz Waliszewski, Magdalena Antos, Piotr Jaworski, Piotr Makowski, Marcin Romaniuk, Rafał Solecki, Agnieszka Szymczak, Preliminary report on the 2012 and 2013 excavation seasons at Jiyeh (Porphyreon): work in sector D (residential Quarter), „Polish Archaeology in the Mediterranean”, XXIV (1), 2015 DOI: 10.5604/01.3001.0010.0087
- Agnieszka Szulc-Kajak, Fishing gear from Jiyeh (Porphyreon)., „Polish Archaeology in the Mediterranean”, 22, 2013.
- Tomasz Waliszewski, Mariusz Gwiazda, Preliminary report on the 2010 excavation season at Jiyeh (Porphyreon), „Polish Archaeology in the Mediterranean”, 22, 2013.
- Tomasz Waliszewski, Jiyeh (Porphyreon): Explorations 2003-2004, „Polish Archaeology in the Mediterranean”, 16, 2005.
- Krzysztof Domżalski, Urszula Wicenciak, Mahmoud El-Tayeb, Tomasz Waliszewski, Late Hellenistic and Early Roman Pottery Production Center at Jiyeh :Rescue Excavations, 2004, „Polish Archaeology in the Mediterranean”, 16, 2005.
- René Dussaud, Topographie historique de la Syrie antique et médiévale, Presses de l’Ifpo, 1927, doi:10.4000/books.ifpo.3692, ISBN 978-2-35159-464-3.

=== External links - archaeology ===
- Jiyeh, localiban
- "Jiyeh". The Levantine Ceramics Project.
- Polish-Lebanese Archaeological Mission in Jiyeh (Porphyreon)
