= Beit ed-Dine =

Beit ed-Dine بيت الدين
- Village
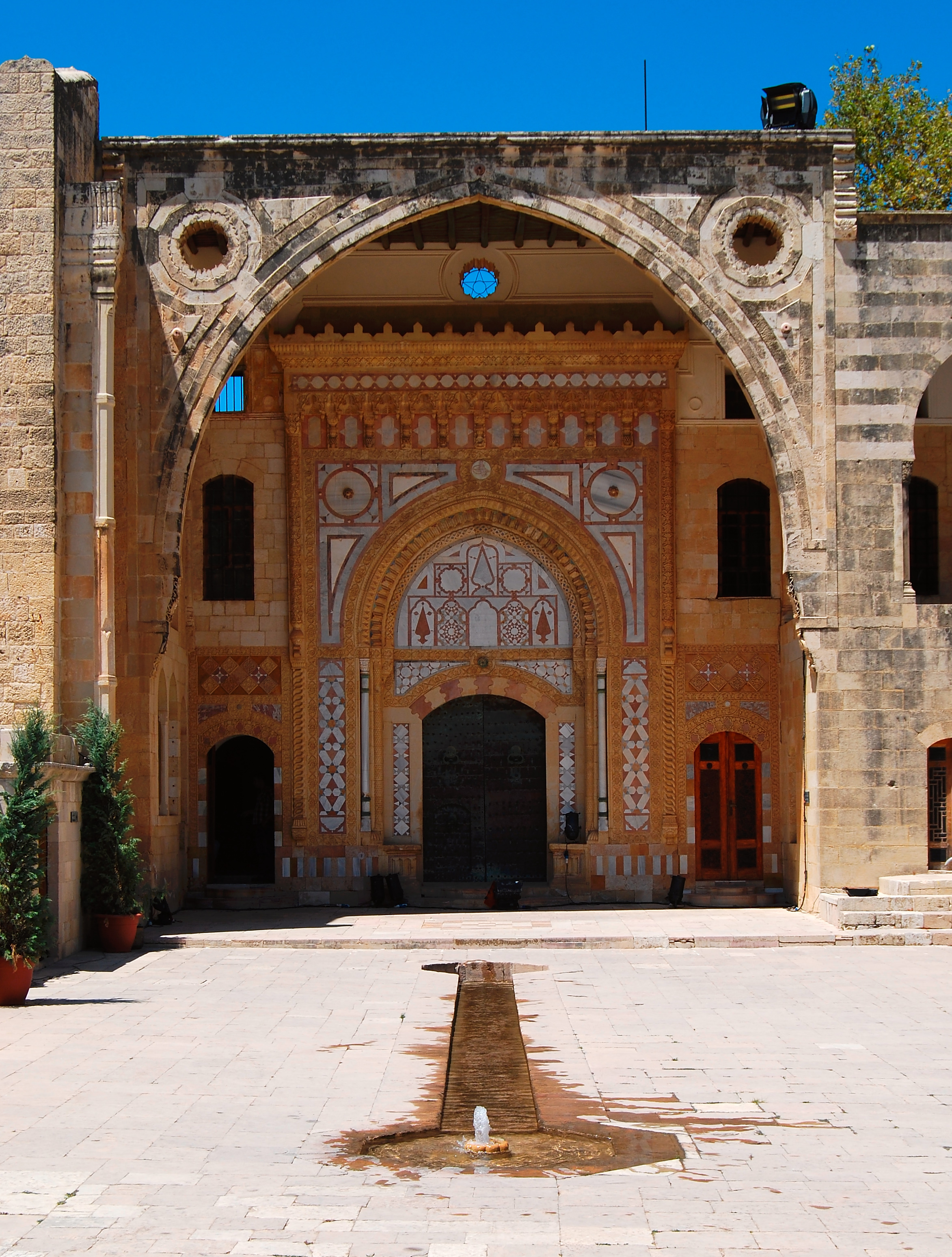
- Beiteddine Palace

- Location within Lebanon
- Coordinates: 33°41′44″N 35°34′45″E
- Country: Lebanon
- Governorate: Mount Lebanon
- District: Chouf

Area
  - Total: 2.44 km^{2} (0.94 sq mi)
- Elevation: 860 m (2,820 ft)
- Time zone: UTC+2 (EET)
  - Summer (DST): UTC+3 (EEST)
- Dialing code: +961

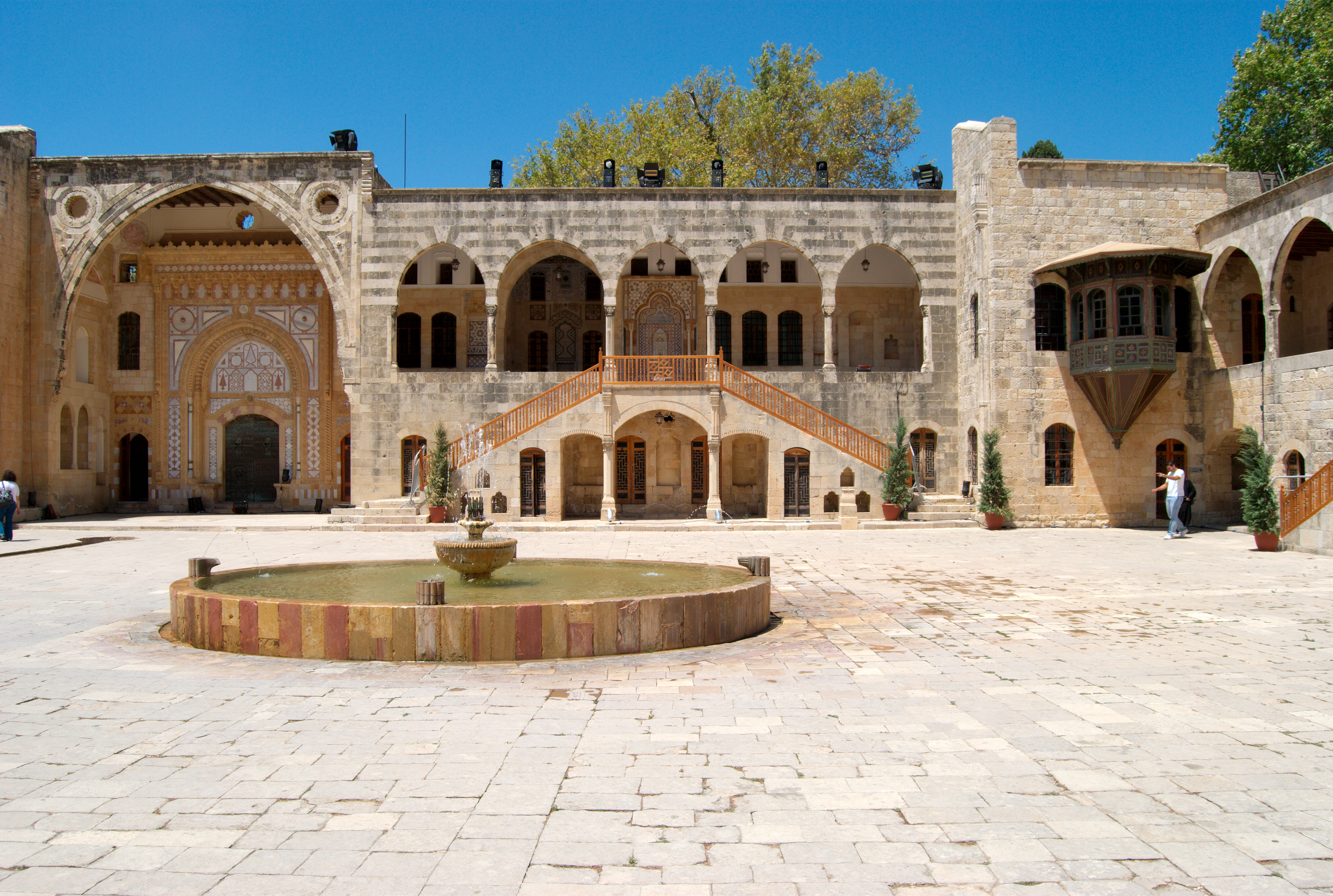
One of many Courtyards in Beiteddine Palace.

Beit ed-Dine (Arabic: بيت الدين, romanized: Bayt ad-Dīn), also known as Btaddine (Arabic: بتدين, romanized: Btaddīn) is a small town and the administrative capital of the Chouf District in the Mount Lebanon Governorate in Lebanon. The town is located 45 kilometers southeast of Beirut, and near the town of Deir el-Qamar from which it is separated by a steep valley. It had 1,613 registered voters in 2010 and its inhabitants are predominantly Christians from the Maronite, Melkite and Greek Orthodox denominations. Beit ed-Dine's total land area consists of 244 hectares and its average elevation is 860 meters above sea level.

The town is well known for the Beiteddine Palace, which hosts the annual summer Beiteddine Festival.

== History ==
=== Ottoman era ===
Emir Bashir II of the Shihab dynasty, who later became the ruler of the Mount Lebanon Emirate, started building the palace in 1788 at the site of the Druze hermitage (hence the palace's name, translating as "House of Faith"), indicating that the town was initially populated by Druze before Bashir lived in it. Bashir moved the headquarters of the emirate from Deir al-Qamar to Beit ed-Dine by 1811. He ruled from the palace he built, known as the Beit ed-dine Palace, which he supplied with water by building a lengthy canal connecting the palace to the Safa River.

After 1840, when Emir Bashir II was sent into exile the palace was used by the Ottomans as a government building. During the French Mandate its role was preserved and it served as a local administrative office. In 1934, it was declared a national monument. During the 1860 Mount Lebanon civil war, around 200 Christians from Deir al-Qamar fled to the Ottoman barracks at Beit ed-Dine to seek shelter before their town was attacked by Druze fighters. After Deir al-Qamar was plundered by the Druze and its inhabitants massacred, they proceeded to attack the Christians who sought shelter at Beit ed-Dine. The outnumbered Ottoman garrison did not resist and the barracks were assaulted. During the French-led international intervention in the war, the French colonel, d'Arricau, chose Bashir's palace in Beiteddine as his headquarters. In the 1860s, the headquarters of the Ottoman deputy governor in Mount Lebanon was relocated to the Beiteddine Palace.

During official celebrations in Beit ed-Dine marking the enthronement of Sultan Abdul Hamid II in 1908, Druze and Maronites from the vicinity clashed in the town, resulting in the deaths of one person from each sect. A week later, a delegation of the local, reformist Liberal Party issued a set of demands in Beit ed-Dine calling for reforms such as the abolition of new taxes and the dismissal of corrupt officials. The governor of Beirut Vilayet, Yusuf Pasha, rejected the demands and ordered the demonstrator's dispersal. However, the Ottoman garrison in Beit ed-Dine sympathized with the demonstrators and refused to disperse them. The governor ultimately acceded to the demonstrators' demands.

=== Modern Era ===
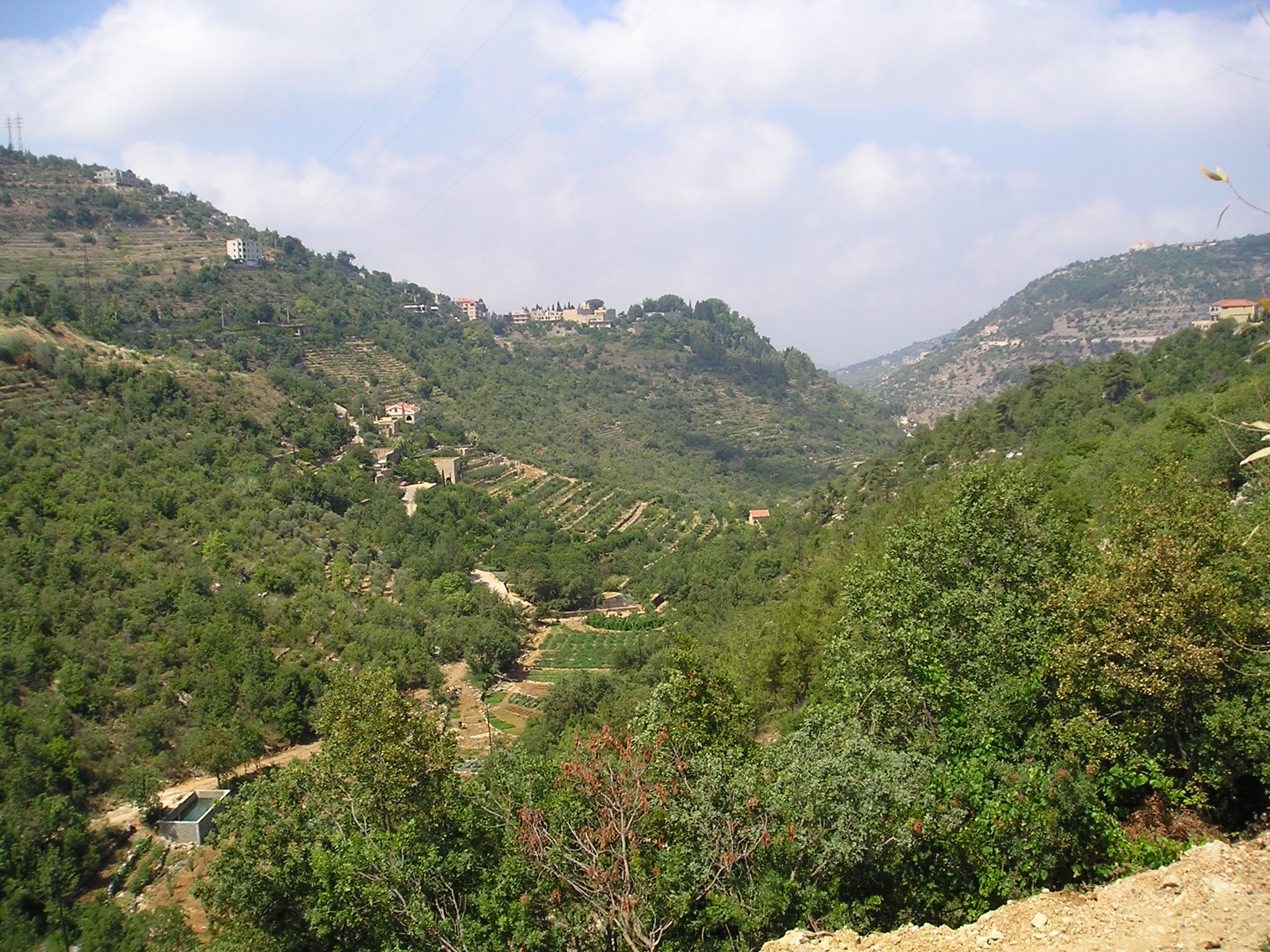
Beiteddine is the capital of the Chouf District

In 1943, Bechara El Khoury, the first Lebanese president, declared it the official president's summer residence. During the Lebanese Civil War (1975–1990) it was heavily damaged. After 1984, when fighting in the area receded, Walid Jumblatt ordered its restoration. Parts of the palace are today open to the public while the rest is still the president's summer residence.

Bashir built three more palaces in the town for his sons, till today only Mir Amin Palace survived and is today a luxury hotel.

Beiteddine is home to a Lebanese Red Cross First Aid Center.

== Demographics ==
In 2014, Christians made up 98.58% of registered voters in Beit ed-Dine. 84.33% of the voters were Maronite Catholics.

== See also ==
- Architecture of Lebanon

== Bibliography ==
- Fawaz, L.T. (1994). An Occasion for War: Civil Conflict in Lebanon and Damascus in 1860. University of California Press. ISBN 9780520087828.
