= Ernest Will =

French archeologist and academic (1913–1997)

- Born: Ernest Louis Georges Will; 25 April 1913; Uhrwiller (Bas-Rhin)
- Died: 24 September 1997 (aged 84); Paris
- Occupation: Archaeologist

Ernest Louis Georges Will (25 April 1913 – 24 September 1997) was a 20th-century French archaeologist and University professor, a member of the Académie des Inscriptions et Belles-Lettres.

== Biography ==
After he finished his secondary studies at the Jean Sturm Gymnasium and passed a licence de lettres at the Strasbourg University, Ernest Will joined the École Normale Supérieure in 1933 and obtained an Aggregation classique in 1936. He was a student of the French School at Athens from 1937 to 1939 and led excavations on the sites of Thasos, Delos and Delphi. When he was mobilized at the approach of World War II, he was affected in Beirut to the staff of General Maxime Weygand. After the Armistice of 22 June 1940, he returned to France where he was now a teacher at the lycée Thiers in Marseille from 1940 to 1943, an assistant to dean Charles Dugas at the Faculty of Arts of Lyon, then he taught at the Collège-lycée Ampère in Lyon (1945).

On 1 October 1946, he became, with Jean Starcky, one of the first residents of the Institut français du Proche-Orient in Beirut, which has founded the same year by Henri Seyrig and specialized in research on the Hellenized Middle East.

On his return to France in 1951, he was an assistant in Greek language at the University of Lille (1951–1953). He defended a thèse d'État ès lettres in 1953, entitled Le relief cultuel gréco-romain : contribution à l'histoire de l'art de l'Empire romain, and was recruited as a university professor in Lille (1953–1963). He was Director of Historic Antiquities of North-Picardie (1953–1968). He joined the Faculté des lettres de Paris as Greek language and literature professor (1963–1970) and then became a professor of art history and archeology at the Institut d'Art et d'Archéologie of the Pantheon-Sorbonne University (1970-1973).

He returned to Beirut as Director of the Institut français d'archéologie du Proche-Orient (IFAPO) (1973-1980), and in this context, engaged into considerable activity during the Lebanese Civil War, to protect the interests of the Institute and "give it a new impetus," including by opening branches in Amman (Jordan) and Damascus (Syria) Since 2003, the IFAPO is a component of the current Institut français du Proche-Orient (IFPO).

After his mission was accomplished, he resumed his position at the Institut d'Art et d'Archéologie then took his academic retirement in 1982.

For 19 years he directed the academic journal Syria dedicated to archaeology published by the Institut Français du Proche-Orient (1978–1997).

He was appointed member of the Scientific Council of the École française d'Extrême-Orient in 1992.

== Sources ==
- Fonds EW - Ernest Will. Archéologie du Proche-Orient hellénistique et romain, MAE René-Ginouvès, université Paris Ouest Nanterre.
- Roger Agache and Jean-Claude Blanchet, « Nécrologie d'Ernest Will (1913-1997) », Revue archéologique de Picardie, n°3-4, 1997, (p. 5–7), Read online
- « Bibliographie d'Ernest Will (1913–1997) », Syria, volume 75, 1998, (p. 1–8), Read online
- Mélanges offerts à Ernest Will, Université de Lille III, Villeneuve d'Ascq, 1984, 430 p. (special issue of Revue du Nord, n°260)
- Georges Le Rider, Notice sur la vie et les travaux de Ernest Will, Palais de l'Institut, Paris, 1999, 10 p.
- Théodore Rieger, « Ernest Will », in Nouveau Dictionnaire de biographie alsacienne, vol. 40, p. 42-43
- Maurice Sartre, « Will Ernest (1913-1997) », Encyclopædia Universalis Read online.

== Works ==
- 1949: La Tour funéraire de Palmyre, Paris, Paul Geuthner.
- 1955: Le Relief cultuel gréco-romain : contribution à l'histoire de l'art de l'Empire romain, Paris, E. de Boccard.
- 1992: Les Palmyréniens, Paris, Armand Colin.
- 1995: De l'Euphrate au Rhin, somme de contributions, IFAPO.
