= Institut Français d'Archéologie de Beyrouth =

Former French research institute established in Beirut, Lebanon

- Successor: Institut français d'archéologie du Proche-Orient (1977–2003); Institut français du Proche-Orient (2003–present)
- Formation: 1946
- Dissolved: 1977
- Type: Learned society
- Headquarters: Beirut
- Location: Lebanon
- Coordinates: 33.8985°N 35.4985°E
- Official language: French
- Key people: Henri Seyrig, first director, 1946–1966); Daniel Schlumberger, director (1967–1972); Ernest Will, director (1972–1977, until 1980 as director of the IFAPO
- Publication: Syria; Bibliothèque Archéologique et Historique (BAH)
- Affiliations: University of Paris; Académie des Inscriptions et Belles-Lettres

The Institut Français d'Archéologie de Beyrouth (IFAB; also known in English as the French Institute of Archaeology in Beirut) was a French research institute established in Beirut, Lebanon, in 1946, dedicated to the study of the archaeology, history and epigraphy of the Levant. It played a significant role in the study and preservation of the archaeological heritage of the Levant, particularly in Lebanon, Syria, and Jordan, until it was reorganized in 1977 as the Institut Français d'Archéologie du Proche-Orient (IFAPO), later becoming part of the Institut Français du Proche-Orient (IFPO) in 2003. The institute was founded by the French Ministry of Foreign Affairs and was initially directed by Henri Seyrig, a French archaeologist and former director of antiquities in Syria and Lebanon during the French Mandate period.

== History and mission ==
The idea of establishing a French archaeological institute in Beirut dates back to the late 19th century, when the French orientalist and archaeologist Charles Clermont-Ganneau proposed in 1882, then again in 1899, the creation of a "station d'archéologie orientale" (oriental archaeology station) in Beirut, dependent on the École française du Caire. However, this proposal did not materialize until after World War II. The IFAB was officially established by the French Ministry of Foreign Affairs on 5 June 1946, under the patronage of the University of Paris and the Académie des Inscriptions et Belles-Lettres. The institute was housed in the historic Beyhum House, a building acquired by the French government in 1910. The house, constructed in 1850 by Hadj Abdallah Beyhum, had previously served as a hospice for the Little Sisters of the Poor and as a soldiers' home during World War II.

The IFAB's primary mission was to conduct archaeological research in the Levant, with a focus on the classical and Byzantine periods. The institute also aimed to publish the results of excavations and studies conducted during the French Mandate period. One of its first major tasks was the publication of the archaeological findings from sites such as Palmyra and Baalbek, which had been excavated by French archaeologists during the Mandate. The IFAB organized several archaeological missions, including the Mission de Syrie du Nord, which focused on the study of early Christian architecture and villages in northern Syria. This mission, led by the Russian architect Georges Tchalenko, produced authoritative publications on the Dead Cities of northern Syria, a series of ancient settlements that flourished during the Byzantine period. Another mission was the Mission of Tell Arqa, which began in 1972, under the direction of the French archaeologist Ernest Will. The IFAB was also responsible for the publication of the Inscriptions Grecques et Latines de la Syrie (IGLS), a comprehensive corpus of Greek and Latin inscriptions from Syria. This project was carried out in collaboration with the Institut Fernand-Courby of the University of Lyon. The institute also played a key role in publishing archaeological findings, including the journal Syria and the Bibliothèque Archéologique et Historique (BAH), which became references in the field of Near Eastern archaeology.

The outbreak of the Lebanese Civil War in 1975 impacted IFAB; the institute's headquarters in Beirut were located in a conflict zone, and the library had to be evacuated. On 18 December 1975, the institute's library, comprising 35,000 volumes, was carefully packed and relocated by the Lebanese Army to the Crusaders' Castle in Byblos for safekeeping. By 1977, during a relatively calmer period, the Institute began establishing new premises in the campus of the French Embassy in Beirut on Damascus Street in Beirut, including constructing a new storage facility for its library. The war also disrupted the institute's fieldwork and forced many of its researchers to relocate to Syria and Jordan. In response to the war, the IFAB expanded its operations beyond Lebanon, establishing branches in Damascus and Amman. This expansion led to the institute's renaming as the Institut Français d'Archéologie du Proche-Orient (IFAPO) in 1977.

== Directors and key figures ==
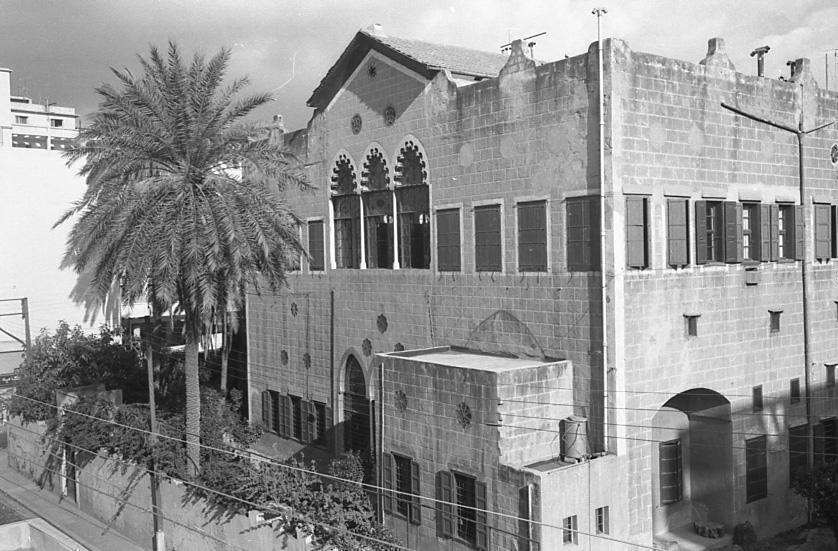
Beyhum Palace, the building that housed the institute.

The French archaeologist Henri Seyrig, an expert on Palmyra, was the institute's first director, serving from 1946 to 1966. He had previously served as the secretary-general of the École française d'Athènes and as the head of the Antiquities Service in Syria and Lebanon. He was succeeded by the French archaeologist Daniel Schlumberger, who directed the institute from 1967 until his death in 1972. Schlumberger was known for his work in Afghanistan and his studies on Hellenistic art in the Near East. Ernest Will served as director from 1973 to 1980; he was one of the first pensionnaires (resident researchers) and he conducted important research on the high-reliefs and funerary towers of Palmyra. Jean Starcky, a French priest from the diocese of Paris, was one of the early editors of the Dead Sea Scrolls. He collaborated with Seyrig on the publication of inscriptions discovered during the excavations of the Agora in Palmyra. Starcky also worked on various publications related to Palmyrene epigraphy.

== Legacy ==
The institute's library and archives remain important resources for researchers, and its legacy continues through the work of the Institut Français du Proche-Orient (IFPO), which was formed in 2003 through the merger of the IFAPO with other French research institutions in the Middle East.

=== Library and publications ===
The IFAB's library contained around 24,000 volumes in 1970, and 35,000 volumes in 1975. It was known for its extensive collection of archaeological and historical works, along with a photo library containing thousands of aerial photographs. The library was evacuated during the Lebanese Civil War in 1975 and relocated to Byblos, where it remained until the end of the conflict.

== See also ==
- Bibliothèque Orientale (Saint Joseph University) – Jesuit-founded research collection, Beirut
- Saint Joseph University of Beirut – Private Catholic research university in Lebanon
