= Roland Tomb =

Lebanese-French author, bioethicist, and dermatologist

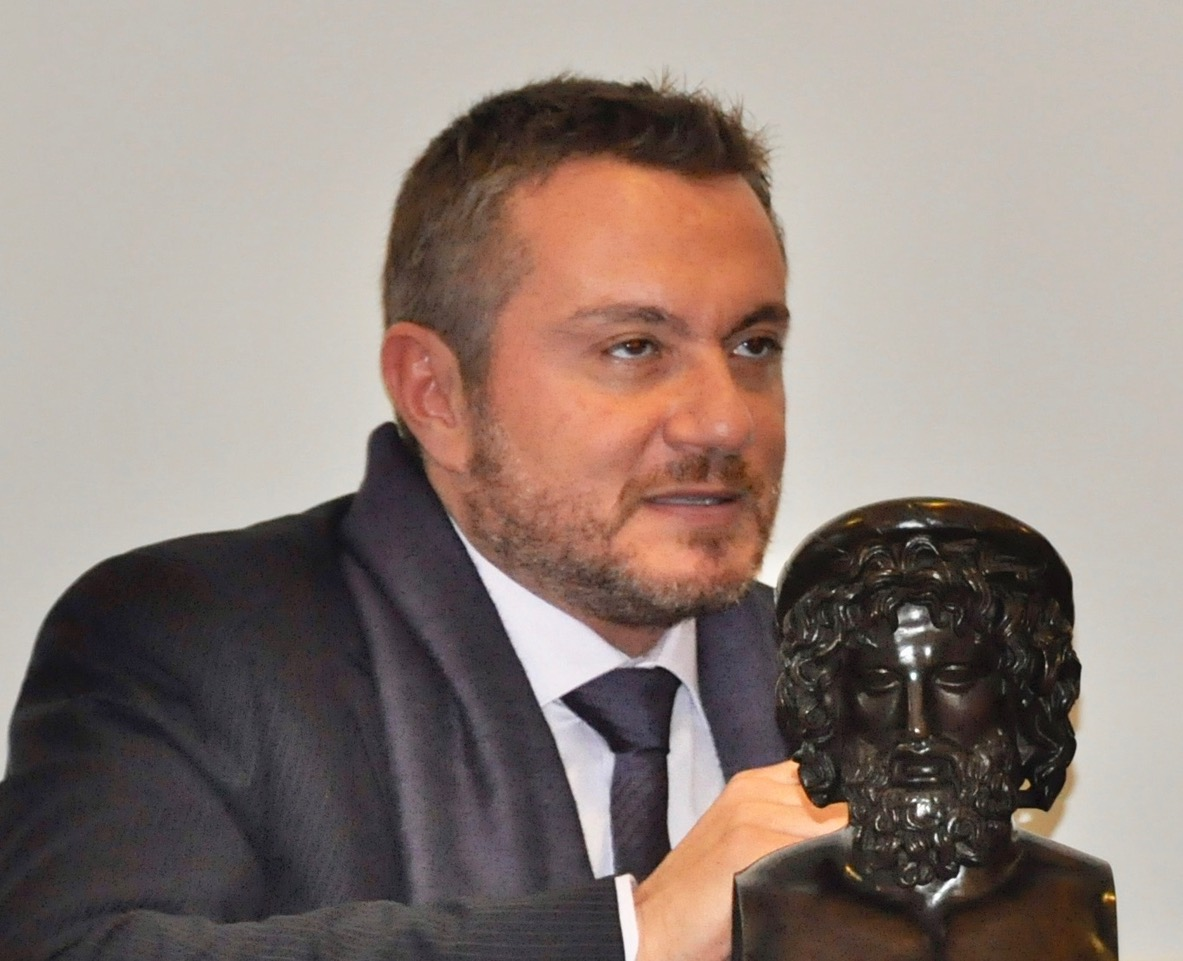
- Born: 1958 (age 67–68); Beirut
- Occupations: Bioethicist; dermatologist

Roland Tomb is a Lebanese-French author, bioethicist and dermatologist born in 1958 in Beirut, Lebanon. He held office as the Dean of the Faculty of Medicine at Beirut's Saint Joseph University from 2011 to 2023. He is the chairperson of the Department of Bioethics at this same university, and is an active member of UNESCO's committees concerned with bioethics.

== Early life ==
Tomb attended high school in Lebanon the Jesuit institution Collège Notre-Dame de Jamhour, graduating in 1976. He pursued his medical studies in Paris, at the Faculty of Medicine Pierre et Marie Curie (part of Sorbonne University), and then obtain his M.D. in 1989 from Louis Pasteur University (today part of the University of Strasbourg). The subject of his thesis, supervised by Pr Edouard Grosshans, was the rediscovery of formerly described skin diseases.

== Medical and academic career ==
When practicing medicine in Strasbourg, where he became assistant clinical director, also taught and conducted research, directed the allergology clinic for 8 years, and also obtained a DEA (Degree of Profound studies) in pharmacology and pharmacochemistry. Tomb relocated to Lebanon in 1993. He started directing the dermatology department at the Hotel-Dieu de France Hospital in Beirut, and was named professor. In 2011, Tomb was elected Dean of Saint Joseph University's Faculty of Medicine. He was reelected twice to this position for four-year mandates, in 2015 and in 2019. During his tenure as dean, Tomb signed numerous conventions and agreements with French, Swiss and Belgian universities and research centers, concerning academic collaboration and student exchanges. He notably initiated the construction of a simulation center and a new high-tech medical school.

Tomb is a member and former president of the Lebanese Society of Dermatologists, a member of the Société Française de Dermatologie, and the vice-president of the Association des Dermatologistes Francophones. He is also a board member of the Lebanese Order of Physicians.

== Medical publications ==
Tomb is the author or co-author of more than 300 articles in medical journals internationally. In addition, he has authored or contributed to the following collective medical works:

- Roland Tomb. Histoire de la Circoncision (History of Circumcision). Paris: Que Sais-Je?, 2022.
- Bernard Gerbaka, Sami Richa, and Roland Tomb. Child Sexual Abuse and Trafficking in the Arab Region. Cham: Springer Nature Switzerland AG, 2021.
- Traité de médecine (Treaty of Medicine). 3 volumes, 5th edition. Paris: Editions du Traité de Médecine, 2020 (5th edition).
- Dermatologie et infections sexuellement transmissibles (Dermatology and Sexually Transmitted Diseases), Paris: Elsevier Masson, 2019 (5th edition).
- Thérapeutique dermatologique. (Dermatological Therapeutics). Paris: Flammarion Medicine, 2011.
- Ruggero Tagliavini; translated, adapted and updated by Roland Tomb. Nouvel atlas pratique de dermatologie et vénéréologie (New Practical Atlas of Dermatology and Venereology). Paris: Ellipses, 1995.

== Work in the field of bioethics ==
At Saint Joseph University's Faculty of Medicine, Tomb created a diploma in medical ethics and was named Chair of bioethics. He was also the president of the ethics committee of the Hotel-Dieu de France hospital in Beirut, and the president of the ethics committee of the Lebanese Order of physicians.

In 2009, Tomb obtained a Doctorat d'État (Ph.D.) in Life Sciences with a focus on philosophy and bioethics from Aix-Marseilles. The thesis, supervised by Pr Pierre Le Coz, tackled the bioethical stakes of male circumcision. In 2022, he published a book, Histoire de la Circoncision, based on his thesis's findings, which has been reviewed internationally.

In 2014, he was named rapporteur at UNESCO's intergovernmental bioethics committee. In 2016, he was named a member of UNESCO's International Bioethics Committee (IGBC), of which he became one of the vice-chairpeople in 2018. In addition, he was a member of the Lebanese National Consultative Committee of Bioethics from 2010 to 2018.

== Other endeavors ==
Tomb is a member of the Board of Advisors of the Alexis and Anne-Marie Habib Foundation that provides financial educational support for Lebanese youth. He has had minor roles in two films, Beyrouth Hotel (2011) and In the Battlefields (2004), both by French-Lebanese filmmaker Danielle Arbid. He has studied ancient Oriental languages at the Institut catholique de Paris and the Faculté de théologie protestante de Strasbourg. He also contributed to several history books, among them:

- Christian Taoutel and Roland Tomb. L'Hôtel-Dieu de France, un Hôpital Centenaire. Beyrouth: Éditions de l'USJ, 2022.
- Lucien Cattin, le bâtisseur. (Lucien Cattin, the Builder). Under the direction of Christian Taoutel. Beirut: Éditions de l'USJ, 2018.
- USJ, Portrait d’une université (USJ, Portrait of a University). By Carla Eddé, Roland Tomb and Cynthia Ghobril-Andrea. Beirut: Éditions de l'USJ, 2016.
- Léon de Laborde, Voyage en Orient (Léon de Laborde: Oriental Travels). Le Blanc, France: ABMB, 2010.
- L'Islande et le Liban : antipodes de l'UE (Iceland and Lebanon : Antipodes of the EU). Under the direction of David Thor Bjorgvinsson and Chibli Mallat. Brussels: Bruyland Edition, 2008.

== Honors ==
- On 19 May 2014, Tomb was made Officer of the Lebanese Order of the Cedar.
- French Légion d'honneur: chevalier (promotion du 1er janvier 2026).
