= IFAB =

IFAB may refer to:

- Institut Français d'Archéologie de Beyrouth (French Institute of Archaeology in Beirut), French research institute in Beirut, Lebanon
- International Film Awards Berlin, film festival
- International Football Association Board, determines the Rules of the Game in association football
