= Andraos =

Andraos is an Arabic surname. It is commonly found in Lebanon in the villages of Jaj, Kefar Aaka, Kousba and Damour and Nabay. Notable people with the surname include:

- Amale Andraos (born 1973), designer
- Antoine Andraos (born 1950), Lebanese politician
- Assaad Andraos (1945–before 2012), Lebanese sports shooter
- Fady Andraos, Palestinian-Lebanese singer and actor
- Maryse Andraos (born 1988), Canadian writer
