= Rue Huvelin =

Street in Beirut, Lebanon

Rue Huvelin (Arabic: شارع هوفلين), is a street located east of Beirut Central District in the neighborhood of Achrafieh. The street is named after Paul Huvelin, a French legal historian who founded the law school of the Université Saint-Joseph in Beirut in 1913. The street was home to the campus of the Petit Collège and Grand Collège of Collège Notre Dame de Jamhour before relocating in the 1950s to the mountain town of Jamhour, Lebanon.

Rue Huvelin is a one-way street that runs east-west from Rue du Liban towards Rue Monnot, intersecting Rue Petro Trad. Some landmarks nearby are the historic Campus of Social Sciences of the Université Saint-Joseph and the Saint-Joseph Jesuit Church. The street is considered an extension of Rue Monnot's vibrant bar and restaurant scene although on a lower scale with mainly affordable student hangouts such as, Bistrot Germanos.

== In Film ==
Rue Huvelin is a Lebanese movie initiated, written and produced by Maroun Nassar, a veteran of the student movement. Directed by Mounir Maasri, Rue Huvelin was the filming location of a band of students fighting against the Syrian occupation in Lebanon. The movie was slightly censored for its release in Lebanon in November 2011, after it toured at international Film Festivals: Moscow, Montreal and Sao Paulo. Rue Huvelin’s DVD is now available and sold in its integral version.
