= Hôtel-Dieu de France =

- Saint Joseph University of Beirut
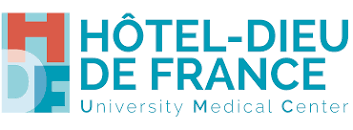

Geography
- Location: Beirut, Lebanon
- Coordinates: 33.887001°N 35.519153°E

Organisation
- Type: Teaching
- Affiliated university: Saint Joseph University of Beirut
- Patron: Alfred Naccache

History
- Founded: 1922

Links
- Website: www.hdf.usj.edu.lb/en/
- Lists: Hospitals in Lebanon

The Hôtel-Dieu de France is one of the three leading Lebanese hospitals. It is located on Alfred Naccache Boulevard in Beirut, and is the oldest active French hospital in the city. Hôtel-Dieu, an old French term for hospital, derives its name from its origins as a Catholic institution and translates to "hostel of God." It is the university hospital of Saint Joseph University of Beirut.

== History ==
The origins of the Hôtel-Dieu de France date back to 1922 when an agreement between the Government of France and French Jesuits gave birth to the French Faculty of Medicine (French: Faculté française de médecine (FFM)) of Saint Joseph University of Beirut.

It continued to grow until 1975, when it was severely damaged and partially destroyed during the Lebanese Civil War. It continued its development and expansion at the end of the conflict. In 1984 the hospital was formally reassigned to the Saint Joseph University which is now responsible of its direct management, while remaining a property of the Government of France.

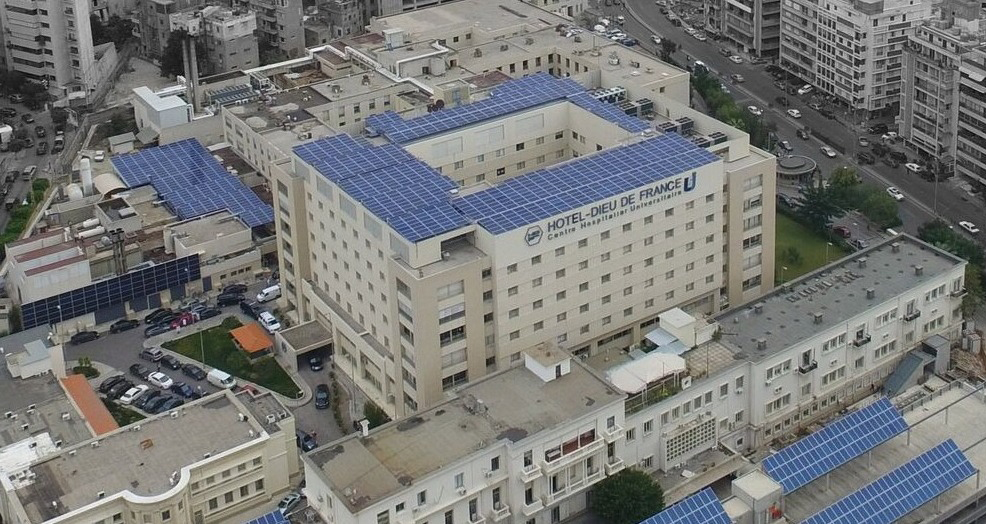
Bird's-eye view of the Hotêl-Dieu de France complex in 2015

=== Chronology ===
1888: Creation of the French Faculty of Medicine of Saint Joseph University of Beirut, following an agreement signed between the Government of France and the Jesuits. However, the faculty lacked a hospital for practice.

1911: Under the leadership of R.P. Lucien Catin, S.J. and on the initiative of the newspaper The Times, the Syndicat de la Presse Parisienne (SPP) in France launched a subscription to build the hospital on a land purchased by the Government of France.

1914-1918: World War I broke out and construction projects were frozen.

1922: General Henri Giraud laid the foundation stone and the construction started in 1923.General Maxime Weygand, his successor, inaugurated the Hôtel-Dieu de France, which opened its doors and admitted its first patient.

1965: An agreement was signed between the Hospital and the Sisters of the Sacred Heart delegating the task of nursing administration.

1984: The hospital remained the property of France but its entire management was transferred to Saint Joseph University of Beirut.

2001: Inauguration of the central building which housed new hospitalization facilities and departments.

2005: Inauguration of the private clinics’ tower.

2010: Under the leadership of R.P. René Chamussy s.j., Rector of the Saint Joseph University of Beirut, the hospital decided to adopt a new governance system.

2020: The Hotêl-Dieu De France, situated in the Achrafieh area in eastern Beirut, accommodated the wounded after the Beirut Port explosion, one of the largest non-nuclear explosions in history, despite suffering damage to several operation rooms, laboratories, and other facilities. As the sole hospital capable of providing assistance and rescue operations for the injured in Beirut, it reached its full capacity due to the overwhelming demand for its services.

2022-present: Hotêl-Dieu de France faces the ongoing socio-economic crisis. It is grappling with the severe repercussions of the economic and financial turmoil that continues to afflict the nation, presenting significant ongoing challenges.

2024: The Hotêl-Dieu De France accommodated the wounded after the Israeli pager and walkie-talkies attacks.
