= Bibliothèque Orientale (Saint Joseph University) =

Jesuit-founded research collection, Beirut

Oriental Library
- Bibliothèque Orientale

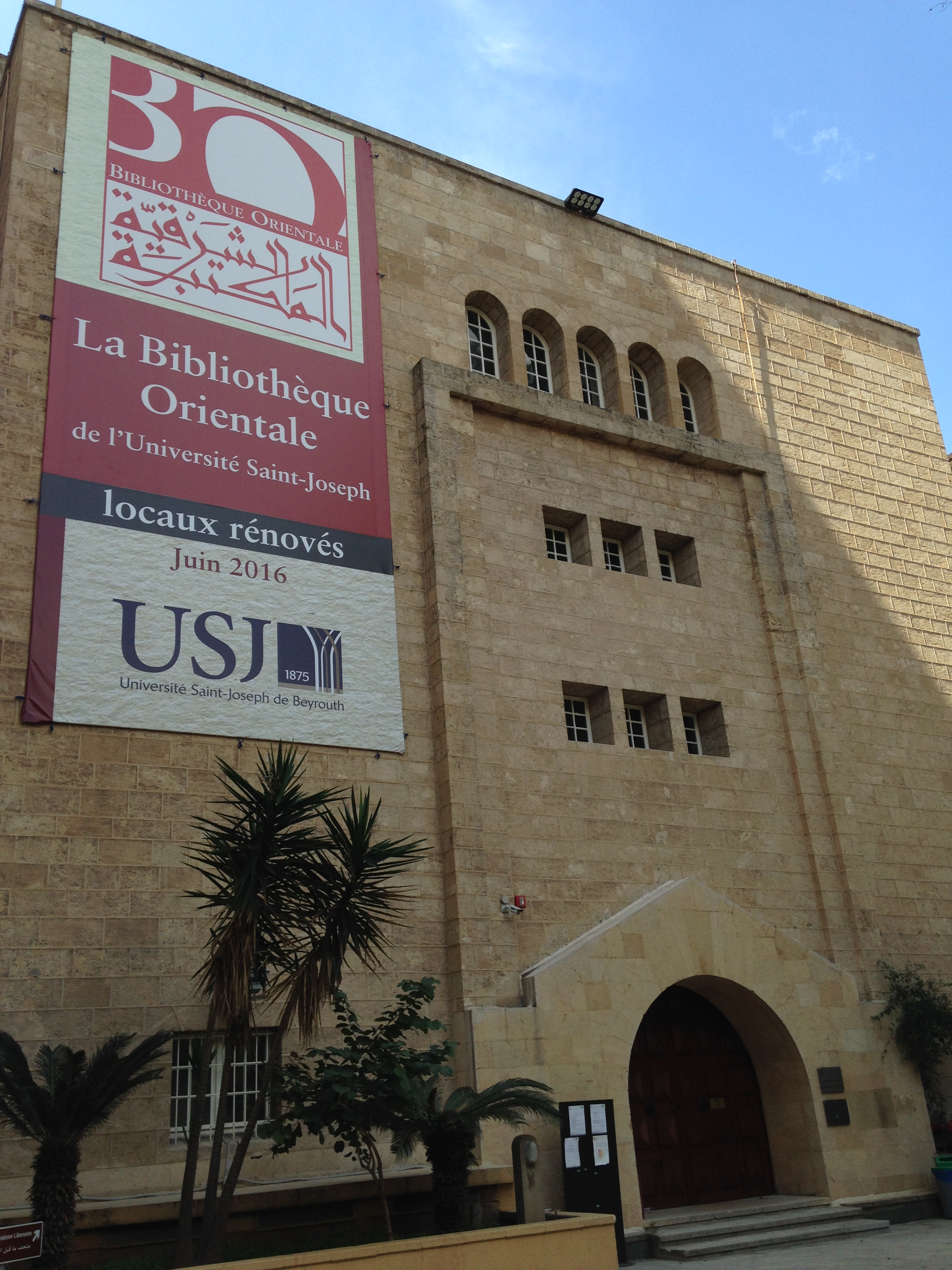
- Entrance to the Orietal Library at the Saint Joseph University Campus in Beirut
- 33°53′30″N 35°30′30″E
- Location: Saint Joseph University Street, Beirut, Lebanon
- Type: Research library
- Established: 1875 (151 years ago)

Collection
- Items collected: Books, journals, newspapers, magazines, maps, Images, prints, drawings and manuscripts
- Size: 225,000

Access and use
- Access requirements: Open to anyone with a need to use the collections and services

Other information
- Website: bo.usj.edu.lb/files/pres-histo.html

The Bibliothèque Orientale (Oriental Library) is a large research library founded in 1875 by the Jesuits of the Saint Joseph University in Beirut, Lebanon. In 2014, it held more than 225,000 books, 250,000 photographs and various documents in the fields of archaeology, theology, history, geography, philosophy, linguistics, literature and art.

== History ==
=== Historical background ===
The first Jesuits arrived from Lyon to Beirut in 1831. They sought to establish a college, and a seminary to train future priests, who were to serve a vast area stretching from Armenia to Egypt. The project was almost abandoned due to the 1840 Lebanon conflict, which pitted the Christian and the Druze communities of Mount Lebanon against each other. In January of the following year, the Jesuits set up a college and a residence in of Beirut. In 1843, Father Benoît Planchet bought a piece of land in Ghazir, a town 27 km (17 miles) north of Beirut, where he established an elementary school. Two years later, Father Canuti welcomed the first seminarians of what became the Oriental Seminary. A secondary school was opened in 1855.

=== The library ===
The library was founded in 1875, initially as the library of the Saint Joseph University in Beirut. It took over the collection of the Seminary of Ghazir, and its collection was enlarged by Father Alexandre Bourquenoud who inventoried the archaeological finds of the region.

Father Louis Cheikho, director from 1880 to 1927, gave it the name of Bibliothèque Orientale in 1894 and enriched it by the works of Orientalists and through the acquisition of old manuscripts. In 1898, it published the Arabic-language oriental catholic journal al-Machriq (The Levant). In 1906, a second journal was created by the Oriental Faculty of the university: the Mélanges de la Faculté Orientale which became the Mélanges de l'Université Saint-Joseph. The library was enriched by international exchanges and the European orientalists of the time.

When the World War I broke out in 1914, it had no equivalent in the whole of the Near East. The Turkish authorities expelled the Jesuits during the war. Fearing the consequences of this expulsion, the consuls of Germany, Austria-Hungary, and the United States in Istanbul intervened directly with the Turkish government to ensure that the library collection would be protected. The library emerged virtually unscathed from the looting following WWI, and the Lebanese civil war, despite being located a few meters from the Green Line separating the two warring parts of Beirut.

Since 2000, the library, which is still owned by the Jesuits, came under the management of the Saint Joseph University, and was open to the public.

The library premises, furniture, storage facilities, and reproduction equipment sustained heavy damage after the 2020 Beirut port explosion. No one was hurt on the premises, and the library’s collection of rare holdings, was “miraculously” spared. Emergency funds were raised by the Aliph foundation (International alliance for the protection of heritage in conflict areas), the Qatar National Library, UNESCO, AFAC (Arab Fund for Arts and Culture), and Œuvre d'Orient, to help cover the cost of the restoration, estimated at $500,000. It was re-inaugurated on 14 March 2022.

== Architecture ==
The current building of the Oriental Library was designed in 1937 by French architect Rogatien de Cidrac, the former chief architect at the French Ministry of Reconstruction and Urban Planning, and the architect of civil buildings and national palaces. The design follows the Romanesque Revival architecture. The building spans three above-ground floors which include a reading room, an exhibition hall, an amphitheater, an image library, and offices. The basement holds the library’s expansive archives.

== Collections ==
=== Books and periodicals ===
Bibliothèque Orientale's collection focuses especially on the Near East, from its prehistory to the present. The disciplines covered are archaeology, history, religions, Islamic studies, theology, philosophy, linguistics, literature and art. The collections are in the main European languages, with the bulk of the collection in French; a third of the collection is in Arabic.

In total, the book library consists of 225,000 titles, including early editions of oriental and western chroniclers and travelers, Arab poets and intellectuals. The library holds 2000 titles of complete and rare collections of European and Arabic journals. This collection includes an almost complete collection of newspapers and magazines dating to the beginning of the Arabic press in Beirut and Cairo, in the second half of the 19th century. Rare holdings include 3700 Arabic, Christian and Muslim manuscripts, as well as manuscripts in Syriac, Garshuni, Latin, Greek, Turkish, Persian, Armenian, Coptic and Hebrew.

=== Image archive ===
The library holds 250,000 photographic documents divided into several collections, including the collection of Father Antoine Poidebard's, an aviator, historian, and archeologist who pioneered aerial archaeology, surveyed the ancient ports of Sidon and Tyre, and laid the foundations of modern underwater archaeology. 1,500 photographs donated by the Williams Douglas Dodd fund covering the Near East, and taken mostly between the two wars. 9,000 photographs of the fortifications of the East and the Mediterranean basin from the Jean-Claude Voisin fund. A series of 500 photographs taken by Assadour Pilibossian, documenting the Armenian population in the eastern provinces of Turkey. Other collections include works from Sétian Varoujan, one of the most prolific Lebanese photographers of the second half of the 20th century, and albums of the Franco-Italian Tancrède Dumas who operated a studio in Beirut, and who worked between 1860 and 1890 for the American Palestine Exploration Society.

=== Maps collection ===
The Oriental Library is home to 2,000 rare old geographical maps of Lebanon and the Near East.

== Laila Turqui Amphitheater ==
The amphitheater of the Oriental Library was restored and inaugurated on 26 April 2013. It was renamed after the Lebanese philanthropist, and Lebanon's first Miss Lebanon pageant winner Laila Turqui (née Zoghbi).

== See also ==
- Institut Français d'Archéologie de Beyrouth – Former French research institute established in Beirut, Lebanon
- Saint Joseph University of Beirut – Private Catholic research university in Lebanon
