= Paul-Louis Huvelin =

French legal historian (1873–1924)

Paul-Louis Huvelin (French: [yvəlɛ̃]; 11 April 1873, Mirebeau-sur-Bèze – 2 June 1924, Lyon) was a French legal historian.

He was a specialist in the study of the earliest forms of Roman law.

== Biography ==
Huvelin spent almost all his career teaching in the law faculty of the University of Lyon which he joined in 1899. That year he made contact with the anthropologist Marcel Mauss and, as a result, gradually became involved with the group of pioneer French sociologists organised by Mauss' uncle Emile Durkheim. Huvelin, as a respected jurist, was welcomed into the Durkheim group and contributed regularly to Durkheim's famous L'Année Sociologique yearbook, from its sixth volume, published in 1906, until the series was suspended on the outbreak of the First World War. Huvelin made important contributions to the sociological study of the earliest forms of Western law. His imaginative if sometimes speculative scholarship explored links between magic and the emergence of ideas of private rights. He also tried to reformulate Durkheim's own ideas of law to make them more compatible with the instrumental legal outlook of jurists.

Towards the end of his life he became involved with efforts to shore up waning French influence in the Middle East. As an offshoot of the Lyon law faculty's involvement with legal education in territories associated with France, he was instrumental in the founding of the law school of the Université Saint-Joseph in Beirut in 1913. In 1919 he led a mission to Syria to assess the growing threats to French interests in the region. He died after a short illness in 1924.

A street in Beirut, is named after him, the Rue Huvelin.

== Works ==
- Essai historique sur le droit des marchés et des foires [Historical Essay on the Law of Markets and Fairs], Paris, A. Rousseau, 1897.
- Les Tablettes magiques et le droit romain [The Magic Tablets and Roman Law]. Macon: Protrat Frères, 1901.
- 'La notion de l’«injuria» dans le très ancien droit romain' [The notion of 'injuria' in very early Roman Law], Mélanges Appleton, 372–499, 1903.
- 'Review of B. Kubler, Kritische Bemerkungen zum Nexum, et al '. Année Sociologique 8:408–16, 1905.
- 'Magie et droit individuel' [Magic and Individual Law]. Année Sociologique 10:1-47, 1906.
- 'Review of P. Kretschmar, Das Nexum und sein Verhaeltnis zum Mancipium '. 11 Année Sociologique 11:433–47, 1909.
- Études sur le «furtum» dans le très ancien droit romain. I. Les sources [Studies on 'furtum' in very early Roman law], Lyon, A. Rey.
- 'Nexum'. In Charles Victor Daremberg and Edmund Saglio, eds., Dictionnaire des Antiquités grecques et romaines. Paris: Librairie Hachette et Cie, 1919.
- 'Que vaut la Syrie?' [What is Syria worth?], L’Asie française, n° 197, 1921.
- Cours élémentaire de droit romain [Elementary course of Roman law], 2 vols, Paris: Sirey, 1927–9.
- Études d’histoire du droit commercial romain [Studies in the history of commercial Roman law], Paris: Sirey, 1929.
