= Arab Master's in Democracy and Human Rights =

Human rights and democracy think-tank led by Arab universities

- Type: Academic department Non-governmental organisation
- Established: 2014
- Director: Carole Alsharabati
- Location: (Lebanon) Beirut, Lebanon
- Campus: Social Science Campus (Huvelin Street)
- Affiliations: Saint Joseph University
- Website: ArMA

The Arab Master's in Democracy and Human Rights is a regional programme established for the study and reinforcement of democracy and human rights in the Arab region. It brings together five leading regional universities: Birzeit University (Palestine), the International University of Rabat (Morocco), the University of Carthage (Tunisia), the University of Jordan (Jordan) and Saint Joseph University of Beirut (Lebanon). It is part of the Global Campus of Human Rights and is supported by the Danish Institute for Human Rights and the European Union.

== History ==
The programme was established in Venice in 2014 by the European Inter-University Centre for Human Rights and Democratisation (EIUC) in co-operation with the Cadi Ayyad University (Morocco), Ca' Foscari University, Birzeit University (Palestine), the International University of Rabat (Morocco) and Saint Joseph University of Beirut (Lebanon). In 2016, the University of Carthage joined the consortium. After three editions in Venice, the programme moved to Beirut in July 2017. The partnership is currently expanding to other universities in the region, such as the University of Jordan and the University of Cairo, and beyond, such as the University of Southern Denmark.

== Academic programme ==
The Arab Master's programme in conjunction with the Institute of Political Science at Saint Joseph University of Beirut offers a master's degree in democracy and human tights. This one-year programme includes ten courses at Saint Joseph University given by an international group of academics and experts from 10 different countries and engaged in various disciplines: international relations, sociology, political thought, international law, human rights, philosophy, critical studies and Islamic studies. Some students do an internship during their semester while working on their thesis in one of the partner universities in the region.

== Features ==
- Regional mobility: The first semester is organised in Beirut with courses taken at Saint Joseph University. The second semester is spent in one of the partner universities in the region in either Jordan, Morocco, Palestine, or Tunisia, where the focus is on researching and writing a thesis.
- International partners: The programme is supported by three intergovernmental organisations. The UNHCR has been supporting its research on Syrian refugees since 2015. OHCHR has participated in the teaching of the international system of human rights protection since 2016, and UNDP has been supporting the electoral system workshops.
- Research and field-action approach: After following courses in applied human rights and participating in several field visits, students partake in a week-long research trip in which they apply quantitative and qualitative research methodologies to the study of refugee-related issues.
