= Hassan Kobeissi =

Lebanese writer and translator

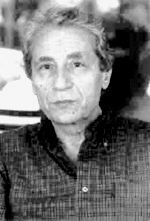
Hassan Koubaissi

Hassan Kobeissi (Arabic: حسن قبيسي, April 15, 1941 - July 5, 2006) was a prominent Lebanese writer, thinker and translator. He was born in Bzebdine, Lebanon, and is considered an important figure in the Lebanese intellectual circle. He is noted for writing publications such as "Rodinson and the Son of Islam", and for his award-winning translations of many prominent philosophical, sociological and anthropological writings.

== Origin ==
Hassan Kobeissi was born in Beirut in the year 1941. His father, Abdul-Karim Kobeissi, had emigrated from the southern village of Zebdine زبدين to the Lebanese capital, where he sought a career under the Lebanese Gendarmerie, which was still under French control. Hassan was the eldest in a family of three, his only siblings by blood being Hussein and Myriam Kobeissi. His father would divorce Hassan's mother and later remarry.

== Education ==
During his primary education, Hassan was taught Arabic and was made to memorize the Koran under the tutelage of the Sheikh Ali Humani School in Musaytbeh (Beirut). However, after his parents' divorce, his father placed him in the Monastic Mashmusha Institute, which was at the time run by Father Neemat-Allah and other priests and monks. There, he was taught French; his understanding of the language would later allow him to independently and easily access writings on western thought and philosophy. He focused particularly on Jean-Paul Sartre, Karl Marx, and Claude Lévi-Strauss, with each of these three thinkers having a considerable impact on his thought during some stage of his life.

In 1958, Hassan obtained the then-equivalent to a high school diploma from the Marj'yun Public School, which was under the supervision of one Anis Al-Raai. Other prominent Lebanese professors would graduate from the school, including Bshara Kerdahi and Michel Abu-Rashed. In 1961, he graduated from the Beirut Institute for the Tutelage of Professors, where he was taught by prominent figures such as Said Akl and Omar Farrukh. This second diploma allowed him to begin teaching Philosophy in public schools, which he did in many southern areas of Lebanon, then in Beirut. In 1965, he obtained a bachelor's degree in Philosophy from the Lebanese University, which allowed him to teach Philosophy in public secondary schools, and then in the Beirut Institute for the Tutelage of Professors. He began teaching at age 19, and was the youngest professor in Lebanese history.

In 1980, Hassan received his Ph.D. from the Université Saint-Joseph. His thesis, (undertaken with the assistance of Father Farid Jabr and Dr. Khalil Al-Jur) which concerned the translation of "Mohammad" by Maxime Rodinson to Arabic, and a dissertation on Marxist economist thought (historical materialism) which Rodinson used in his biography of Muhammad, was later independently published by the Lebanese Institute for University Publications under the name "Rodinson and the Son of Islam". The publication would quickly gain attention first in Lebanon then in the arab world in intellectual circles. However, Hassan's translation of Rodinson's "Mohammad" was not published, for the controversial book may have caused more sectarian strife in a country already overtaken by civil war.

== Achievements ==
Hassan Kobeissi taught Philosophy at the Lebanese University, where he translated twenty books concerning Philosophy and Anthropology. The authors translated included Mircea Eliade, Nietzsche, Claude Lévi-Strauss, Jean-Paul Sartre, and John Locke. Hassan also translated a great number of studies, which were subsequently published in Lebanese and Arabic journals. Most prominently, Hassan focused his effort on a journal titled "Al-Fikr Al-Arabi" ("The Arab Thought"), for which he was editor for the period of two years. There, he edited and published more articles concerning Anthropology.

Hassan won the 1993-1994 prize for the best translation of a book from French to Arabic for his work on Nostalgie des Origines by Mircea Eliade.

== Political life ==
In 1968, Hassan Kobeissi, along with some intellectual peers (Ahmad Beydoun, Fawaz Trabulsi, Wadaah Shrara, [...]), were considering founding the leftist Lebanese Marxist party. Hassan, who was very influenced by Existentialist Jean-Paul Sartre and by socialist Karl Marx, was very critical of the current Lebanese political state. His criticism, combined with that of others, resulted in the splitting of the Lebanese Communist Party and the merging of the Socialist Labor Organization (led by Mohsen Ibrahim) with the Socialist Lebanon Group, which led to the birth of Communist Labor Organization. However, shortly before the beginning of the Lebanese civil war, Hassan withdrew from the organization in protest of its downslide towards supporting political and military initiatives that backed up the sectarian militias that would later be responsible for the Lebanese civil war.

Hassan thus ended his political activism, and instead chose to immerse himself in his philosophical studies. He was particularly interested in the structural and systemic approach of Anthropology, which led him to translate Claude Lévi-Strauss' Anthropologie Structurale from French to Arabic. In his later years, Hassan would renounce his socialist and communist ideas completely.

== Personal life ==
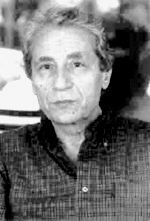
Hassan Kobeissi, taken in a Hamra Street coffee shop

Hassan lived most of his life in a small apartment in Ras El Nabeh. He had a personal library which amounted to more than 10,000 books and publications. He also owned a small house in his home village of Zebdine which he had built himself, where he liked to spend summers, quietly reading or tending to his garden, or sometimes visiting his neighbours (who were mostly his own siblings or half-siblings) for a chat or a game of cards.

In 1984, Hassan married a Télé Liban news anchor, his close friend and fellow intellectual Ahmad Beydoun's sister. They had one child, Nadim, and divorced in 1991. Hassan would later remarry many times.

Hassan enjoyed long walks and mountain hiking, tending to his garden in his village home in Zebdine, making his own wine, and drinking coffee with his friends at the Cafe De Paris in Hamra Street. Personally, he was known for his reverence of silence, much preferring to listen than to speak, for his pronounced (almost excessive) pride, stubbornness, and sometimes arrogance (he was known to almost never apologize for any action he had committed). He sometimes played the piano (he was self-taught) and also liked to sing songs of various Arabian artists, such as Umm Kulthum. People close to him described him as a man of passion and tenderness that however had tremendous difficulty in expressing strong emotions.

== Death ==
Hassan Kobeissi died suddenly from a heart attack on July 5, 2006. He had been previously suffering from searing chest pain, which he thought (and was told by his doctor) to be a result of stomach problems. Shortly before his death, he had called a close friend of his and asked her to go on a walk with him. They walked silently in a park. Hassan then asked his friend to sit down on a bench, and slowly went around the park, once, on his own. He then sat back next to her and said, in Arabic, his last words, which were: "Do you know how a man transcends his end?". Scarcely had he finished that phrase, he suffered from a heart attack and fell from the bench. He was declared Dead Upon Arrival to the hospital.

== Published works ==
- Kobeissi, Hassan. Rodinson and the Son of Islam. Beirut: Lebanese Institute for University Publications
- Kobeissi, Hassan. The Board and the Margin (Al Matn Wal Hamish ). Beirut: The Arabic Cultural Centre, 1997.

== Published translations ==
- Rbat, Edmond. The Formation of a Political and Constitutional Lebanon. Beirut: Lebanese University Press, 2002.
- Lombard, Jaques. Introduction to Theology. The Arabic Cultural Centre, 1997.
- Fromm, Erich. Forgotten language; an introduction to the understanding of dreams, fairy tales, and myths. Second Edition. The Arabic Cultural Centre, 1995.
- Corbin, Henry. History of Islamic Philosophy. Lebanon: Oweidat عويدات.
- al-Bizri, Dalal. Sisters of Shadow and Uncertainty. Lebanon: Dar An-Nahar, 1996.
- Levi-Strauss, Claude. Structural Anthropology. The Arabic Cultural Centre, 1995.
- Evans-Pritchard, E.E. Theories of Primitive Religion. House of Modernity.

== Sources ==
This article is mostly a translation of and is based on حسن قبيسي.
