= Omar Zaani =

Lebanese artist (1885–1961)

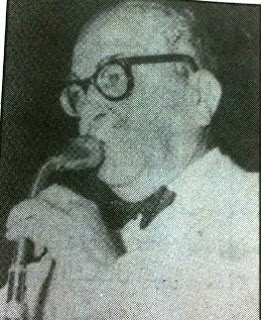
- Born: 1885
- Died: 1961 (aged 75–76)
- Occupations: Ballad poet, singer

Omar Zaani (1885–1961) was a prominent Lebanese ballad poet and singer. He was known for using his art to criticize and revolt against social injustice throughout the different historical and political stages in his country, especially the Ottoman Empire occupation and French mandate of Lebanon. As a result, he was referred to as the "poet of the people", "son of the country", "Arab Voltaire", and "Molière of the East". His poems, which he delivered through songs and melodies, were usually written in spoken Arabic, so that they could be read and understood by people of different educational backgrounds. His art is still prevalent to this day.

== Biography ==
=== Early life ===
Omar Zaani was born on July 18, 1885, in Zokak El-Blat, Beirut, to Sheikh Ahmad Zaani and Bahia Mogharbel, who named Omar Zaani after his grandfather. He had 5 brothers. The Zaani family in Beirut was known to have Egyptian origins.

At the age of 8, Zaani's father registered him in the Ottoman College in Bourj Abi Haydar, Beirut, where he joined the musical band in 1901, and graduated in 1913. His interest in poetry and reading began to develop. Stories about him include that he was devoted to the extent that he used to sit almost every night on the streets, under the municipal lantern, to spend his time reading. Allegedly too, he wrote his very first poems on the wall of his house due to the shortage of paper.

=== Life during the war ===
When World War I sparked in 1914, Omar Zaani traveled to Homs, Syria, where he attended the Ottoman Military School. Six months later, he graduated as an administrative officer (in Arabic: ظابط إداري). Later on, Zaani was assigned as a supply officer to provide the troops in El-Sham, Damascus, with food, and thus did not participate in the fighting. During this period, Zaani used to travel between Al-Sham in Damascus, Be'er Sebaa in Palestine, and Jerusalem. In 1916, he was deported to Palestine, after Jamal Pasha executed several Lebanese and Syrian nationalists for alleged anti-Turkish activities. He spent two years there before returning to Lebanon in 1918.

=== Life after the war ===
After the war was over, Zaani helped his father cover his family's expenses by working as the director of the Ottoman College from which he had graduated, and a music teacher at the Marie Kassab School. Whilst working, Zaani wrote different plays, then presented them on the school's stage with the help of his friends.

In 1920, Zaani worked as an officer in the Al-Bidaya court in Beirut. He was then awarded a scholarship from Al-Makassed Philanthropic Islamic Association of Beirut to study law in Saint Joseph University, which he joined after passing the exam.

Later, Omar Zaani was deported to the Batroun court by a special decree issued by Charles Debbas, then the Lebanese President, after Zaani wrote "بدنا بحرية يا ريس", in which he heavily criticized the Lebanese president and the French mandate of Lebanon.

== Literary career ==
Omar Zaani was a ballad poet and singer. His songs and poems frequently reflected the social and political circumstances as well as the historical events that were arriving in Lebanon and surrounding Arab countries. He indirectly and satirically criticized the regime in most of his works. Hence, as a civil servant, he did not want to reveal his identity at the beginning of his artistic career. He went incognito with the name of "Mr. Honnein."

Through his art, Zaani aimed to deliver the problems, worries, and sufferings of the people. His use of a mixture of written and informal dialect in his poems was a mirror of that. He claimed that these types of poems were commonly used in France, and were one of the main factors that lead to the French Revolution in 1789. For that reason, he gained the title of the "poet of the people", "son of the country", "Arab Voltaire", and "Molière of the East".

=== Poems about Lebanon ===
One of Omar Zaani's first significant poems was "Al-Hijab," which he wrote during the French mandate of Lebanon. In this poem, he reprimanded people who seemed to give little attention to important events and more care for more shallow matters, such as a woman's attire. Another very famous poem he wrote was "Badna Bahriya Ya Rayyes," in which he criticized the first Lebanese president of the State of Greater Lebanon, Charles Debbas. It is noteworthy to mention that the poem is still chanted but with modified lyrics.

Then, with the independence of Lebanon, Zaani cheerfully chanted "Hay' Allah al Mukhelsin," in addition to several other poems. According to Samir Zaani, the General Secretary of Omar Zaani's heritage, in his book "Omar Zaani: The Molière of the East," Omar Zaani was "in complete harmony with the constitutional authority and president Bechara El Khoury" back then. However, Zaani then rebuked the elections, bribery, and monopoly in Lebanon through other poems, such as: "Jaddedlo w La Tefza'".

Omar Zaani advocated for equality between the poor and the rich, as he highlighted the exploitation against the working class. In one of his poems, "Law Kunt Hisanan," Zaani communicated "his revolution against social stratification," as Samir Zaani remarks.

Omar Zaani also composed a poem called "La Tahrimuha" in support of women's rights.

=== Poems about the Arab world ===
Zaani's works did not include events in Lebanon exclusively. He wrote a poem called "Al Bassara wa Thurayya," in which he narrated the significant events that occurred in the Arab region by personifying Syria as a girl named Thurayya. Zaani penned about the French bombing in response to the Great Syrian revolution in 1925. Furthermore, he wrote in support of the case for Palestine, especially after the loss of Arabs in their war against Israel in 1948. Plus, he wrote a poem that showed his support for the Egyptian Revolution of 1952 and the Egyptian people in the Suez crisis in 1956. Last but not least, he sang for Iraq after being invited to visit the country by the Prime Minister of Iraq.

== Relationship with authorities ==
Lebanese authorities did not appreciate Zaani's art. His songs were not broadcast on the radio like other artists. This matter bothered Zaani and caused him many disappointments, especially because he was a talented artist who was loved and appreciated by most of the people at that time.

Omar Zaani did not usually agree with the people in authority. Instead, he spent time with people listening to their problems, demands, and hopes, and turned them into poems. As Mahmoud No'man narrates in his book "Omar Zaani: The Poet of the People", people once listened to Zaani's poems instead of gathering around orators and people of the ruling regime in a national party held by them. This, according to No'man, led to the wrath of the rulers, as the police arrived to the party and asked Zaani to stop rioting, and it was then when Zaani replied: "Oh Brother, tell your masters that the party is there with the orators, so let them listen to them. As for me, I am happy with my popular kingdom and these kind people who listen to me.”

=== Exile ===
In 1940, Omar Zaani wrote a poem titled “بدنا بحرية يا ريس”, in which he criticized the French Mandate of Lebanon and the first president of the state of Greater Lebanon, Charles Debbas. As a result, Debbas issued a decree in which he ordered deporting Zaani to the Batroun court. Hence, Zaani decided to resign from his job in Al-Bidaya court in Beirut (in Arabic: محكمة البداية في بيروت), and devote himself to his art. In that period, Omar Zaani's poems and songs were greatly developed. He recited some of his national and social poems in public theaters.
