= Saint Joseph University of Beirut =

Private Catholic research university in Lebanon

- جامعة القديس يوسف في بيروت
- Motto: Ad maiorem Dei gloriam (Latin)
- Motto in English: For the greater glory of God
- Type: Private Roman Catholic Research Non-profit Coeducational Higher Education Institution
- Established: 1875; 151 years ago
- Religious affiliation: Society of Jesus
- Academic affiliations: List: International Association of Universities; International Federation of Catholic Universities; Association of Wholly or Partly French-Language Universities; Association of Arab Universities; Federation of European Catholic Universities; Association of Jesuit Higher Education Institutions in Europe and Lebanon; Euro-Mediterranean Association; EuroMed Permanent University Forum
- President: François BOËDEC, SJ
- Rector: François BOËDEC, SJ
- Faculty: 2,000
- Administrative staff: 598
- Students: 11550
- Location: Beirut, Lebanon; 33°53′28″N 35°30′30″E
- Campus: 5 urban campuses in Beirut, 3 regional university centers in Sidon, Zahlé and Tripoli, Lebanon, and 1 in Dubai
- Colors: Navy Blue and white
- Sporting affiliations: List: Lebanese Universities Sports Federation; UniLeague Championship
- Website: usj.edu.lb?lang=2

Saint Joseph University of Beirut (Arabic: جامعة القديس يوسف في بيروت; French: Université Saint-Joseph de Beyrouth, commonly known as USJ) is a private Catholic research university in Beirut, Lebanon, founded in 1875 by French Jesuit missionaries and subsidized by the Government of France during the time when Lebanon was under Ottoman rule.

As the oldest French university in Lebanon, it promotes Lebanese culture and upholds a policy of equal admission opportunity without consideration of ethno-religious affiliations. It advocates trilingual education, offering instruction in Arabic, French, and English. It is known in Lebanon and the Middle East for its university hospital, the Hôtel-Dieu de France, and for its Faculty of Law, modern Lebanon's oldest law school and the first law school in Lebanon since the ancient Roman law school of Berytus.

The 12,650-student enrollment is served by an academic staff of 2,000 and a support staff of 540, distributed over its 13 faculties, 24 institutes and schools, across five campuses in Beirut, with regional university centers in Sidon, Tripoli, and Zahlé, as well as one foreign center, the USJ-Dubai, located in Dubai, UAE.

USJ is the only university in the Middle East and the Arab world to follow the European Credit Transfer and Accumulation System (ECTS), as well as having official recognition and compliance with the higher education regulations of Lebanon. USJ has partnerships with over 275 institutions in 42 countries, including Francophone, Jesuit, and Arab universities.

== History ==
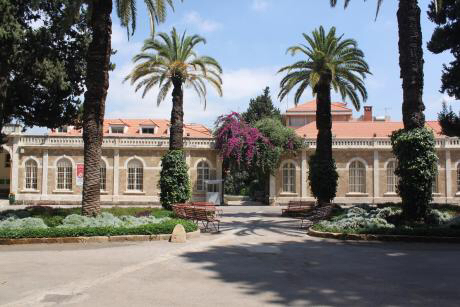
Entrance to the Medical Sciences Campus.

In 1839, French Jesuit missionaries, including Maksymilian Stanisław Ryłło, came to Beirut and established a modest French Catholic school. Later, in 1855, the Jesuits founded a bigger seminary-college in Ghazir. The seminary moved to Beirut in 1875, where it merged with the first school established earlier in 1839. Public authorities quickly graced the new school with the title of "university," which allowed it to grant academic degrees, with a focus on doctoral degrees in philosophy and theology. In his audience of 25 February 1881, Pope Leo XIII bestowed the title of pontifical university on USJ.

The Institute of Medicine, founded in 1883, became the French Faculty of Medicine in 1888, and later the French Faculty of Medicine and Pharmacy in 1889. A maternity clinic opened in 1896, followed by the Oriental College in 1902. The university has since been noted for establishing a continuous French presence in the eastern Mediterranean.

The School for French Law was established in 1913 under the patronage of the University of Lyon. The Institute for Political Sciences was first established in 1920 and is now known as "SciencesPo Beyrouth." They both evolved into the Faculty of Law and Political Science of Saint Joseph University in 1946. Today, the Faculty of Law continues to offer education covering both French and Lebanese law.

Most of the major law classes are taught in French. The Faculty of Law offers courses in corporate law, family law, private international law, as well as in other areas of international law. The Institute of Political Science offers the Arab Master's in Democracy and Human Rights.

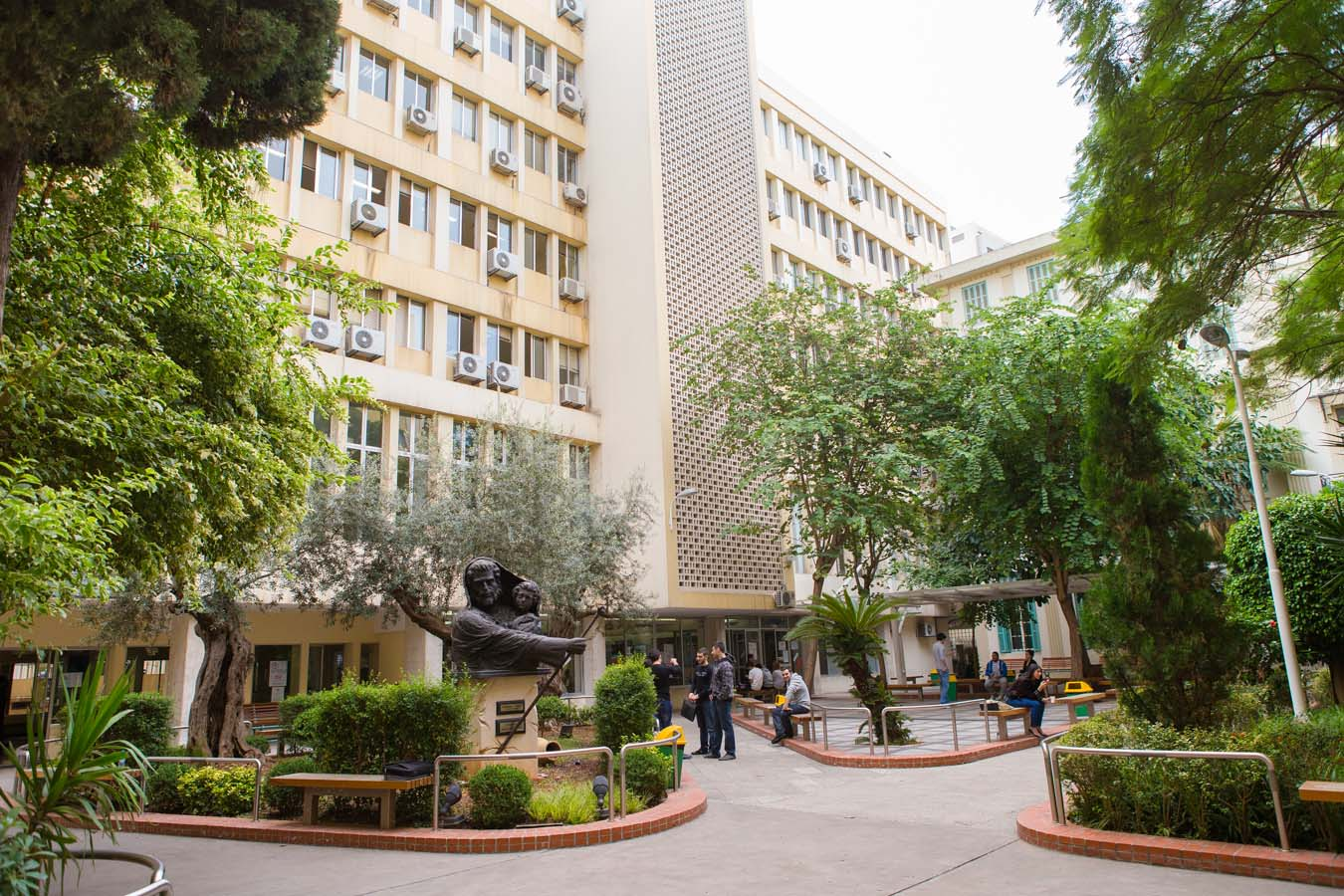
A statue of Saint Joseph in the Social Sciences Campus commonly known as "Huvelin."

The French School of Engineering also founded in 1913 became the Higher School for Engineering of Beirut (French: École Supérieure d'Ingénieurs de Beyrouth (ESIB)) in 1948. For many years, USJ offered the only engineering education in Lebanon and the Levant, training the first generations of engineers in the region.

The university launched Berytech, a business development center, in 2008. In 2012, the Faculty of Economics launched a new master's degree in web science and digital economy, the first of its kind in the Middle East region.

The saying goes that "[i]t is Saint Joseph University of Beirut that has healed, legislated, and built Lebanon." (French: "C’est l’USJ qui a soigné, légiféré, et construit le Liban.") The university ranks very high for the quality of its publications.

== Academics ==
Saint Joseph University of Beirut has been consistently ranked as the second-best university in Lebanon, and it has a historical rivalry with the top English-speaking university, the American University of Beirut (AUB).

The University has 13 faculties, 24 institutes and schools, spread out across five campuses in the city of Beirut, as well as regional centers in three other major cities of Lebanon, and a foreign center in Dubai. It is structured as follows:

- Medicine and Health
1. Faculty of Medicine (French: Faculté de médecine (FM)) which was founded in 1883. It operates a large university hospital, the Hotêl-Dieu de France, and includes:
  1. The School of Midwifery (French: École de sage-femmes (ESF)) founded in 1922
  2. The Institute of Physical Therapy (French: Institut de physiothérapie (IPHY)) founded in 1956
  3. The Institute of Psychomotor Therapy (French: Institut de psychomotricité (IPM)) founded in 1999
  4. The Higher Institute of Speech and Language Therapy (French: Institut supérieur d'orthophonie (ISO)) founded in 1966
  5. The Institute of Occupational Therapy (French: Institut d'ergothérapie (IET)) founded in 2016
  6. The Higher Institute of Public Health (French: Institut supérieur de santé publique (ISSP)) founded in 2016
2. Faculty of Pharmacy (French: Faculté de Pharmacie (FP)) founded in 1889 and which includes:
  1. The School of Medical Laboratory Scientists (French: École de techniciens de laboratoires d'analyses médicales (ETLAM)) founded in 1946
3. Faculty of Dental Medicine (French: Faculté de médecine dentaire (FMD)) founded in 1920
4. Faculty of Nursing Sciences (French: Faculté des sciences infirmières (FSI)) founded in 1942
- Art, Humanities, Religious Studies

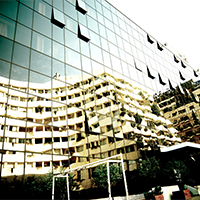
Façade of the Humanities Campus.

1. Faculty of Humanities (French: Faculté des lettres et des sciences humaines (FLSH)) reorganized in 1976 and now comprising specialized departments for western literature; sociology and anthropology (including human resources management); history (including archeology, and cross-cultural studies); geography (including tourism geography, and environmental resource management); philosophy (including eastern and western philosophy); and psychology. The faculty includes:
  1. The Institute of Oriental Letters (French: Institut de lettres orientales (ILO)) founded in 1936 and focused mainly on Arabic literature, islamic philosophy, islamic studies, and education in Arab countries
  2. The Lebanese School of Social Work (French: École Libanaise de Formation Sociale (ELFS)) founded in 1948
  3. The Institute of Theatre, Audiovisual, and Cinema Studies (French: Institut d'Études Scéniques, audiovisuelles, et cinématographiques (IESAV)) founded in 1988
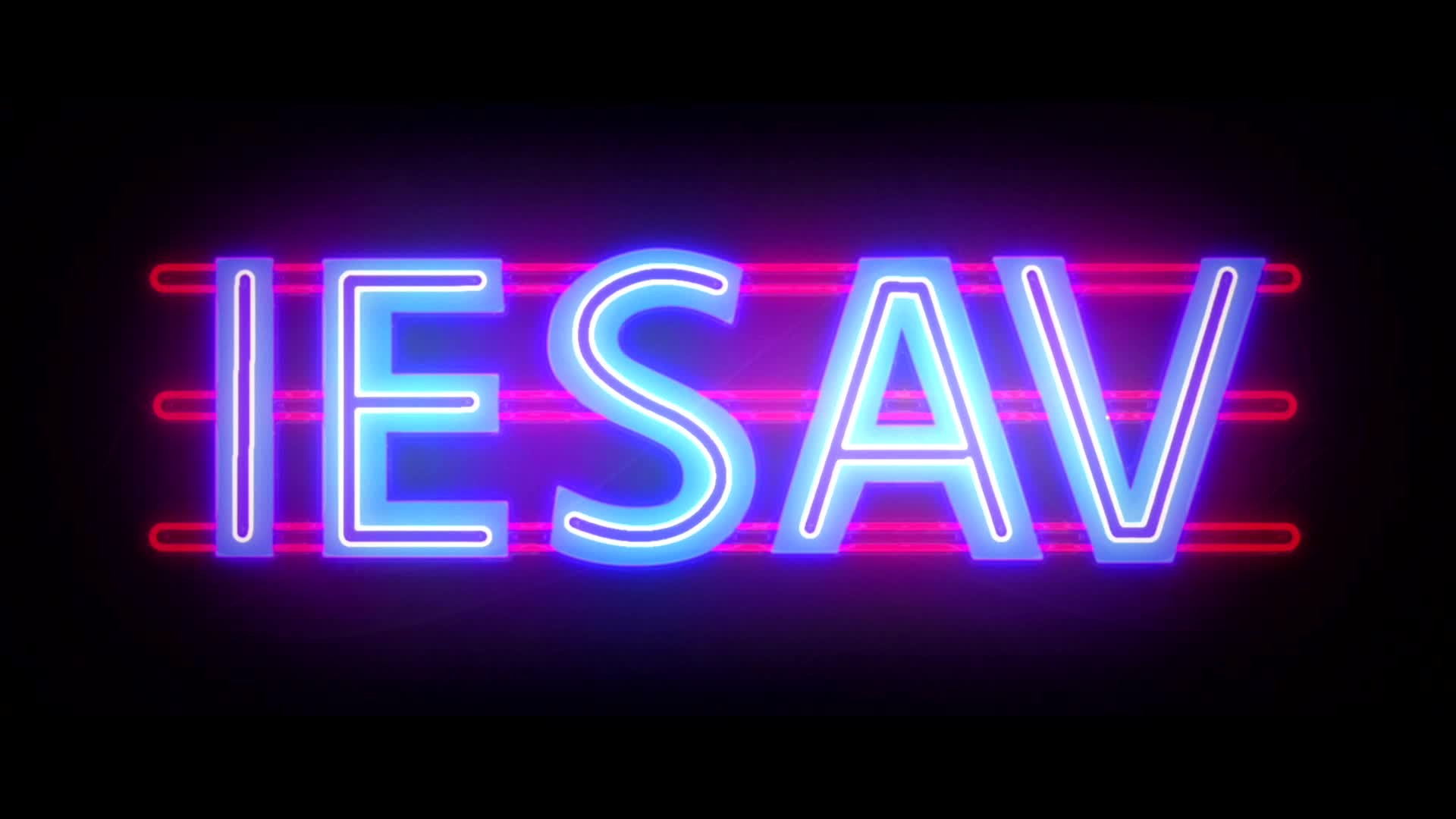
    Logo of USJ's Institute of Theatre, Audiovisual, and Cinema Studies (IESAV). Nadine Labaki, a distinguished alumna of IESAV, shines as a prominent figure in the realm of artistic achievements.
2. Faculty of Languages and Translation (French: Faculté des langues et de traduction (FdLT)) founded in 1980 and which includes:
  1. The School of Translators and Interpreters of Beirut (French: École de traducteurs et d'interprètes de Beyrouth (ETIB))
  2. The Center for Modern Languages (French: Centre des Langues Vivantes (CLV))
3. Faculty of Education Sciences (French: Faculté des sciences de l'éducation (FSédu)) which includes:
  1. The Lebanese Institute for Educators (French: Institut libanais d'éducateurs (ILE))
4. Higher School of Arts and Fashion Design (French: École supérieure des arts et techniques de la mode (ESMOD)). ESMOD was initially established in 1841 in Paris by Alexis Lavigne, the tailor of Empress Eugénie of France. It is present in Lebanon since 1999 and is now part of USJ
5. Faculty of Religious Sciences (French: Faculté des sciences religieuses (FSR)) with a long and rich history going all the way back to 1875. It includes:
  1. The Higher Institute of Religious Sciences (French: Institut supérieur de sciences religieuses (ISSR)) established in 1980
  2. Institute of Islamo-Christian Studies (French: Institut d'études islamo-chrétiennes (IEIC)) founded in 1977
- Law, Political Science
1. Faculty of Law and Political Science (French: Faculté de droit et des sciences politiques (FDSP)) founded in 1913 and reorganized in 1946. It includes:
  1. The Institute of Political Science (known as "SciencesPo Beyrouth") (French: Institut des Sciences Politiques (ISP)) founded in 1920
  2. The Center for Legal Studies in the Arab World (French: Centre d'études des droits du monde arabe (CEDROMA)). CEDROMA was founded in 1997 following a partnership agreement between the University and the French Ministry for Europe and Foreign Affairs. Its purpose is to promote a better understanding of the laws of Arab countries through a comparative law approach, particularly in relation to French law
- Economics, Management, Banking, Insurance
1. Faculty of Economics (French: Faculté des sciences économiques (FSE))
2. Faculty of Business Administration and Management (French: Faculté de gestion et management (FGM)) which includes:
  1. The Institute of Business Administration (French: Institut de gestion des entreprises (IGE))
3. Higher Institute for Banking Studies (French: Institut supérieur d'études bancaires (ISEB))
4. Higher Institute for Insurance Studies (French: Institut supérieur des sciences de l'assurance (ISSA))
- Engineering and Technology, Sciences
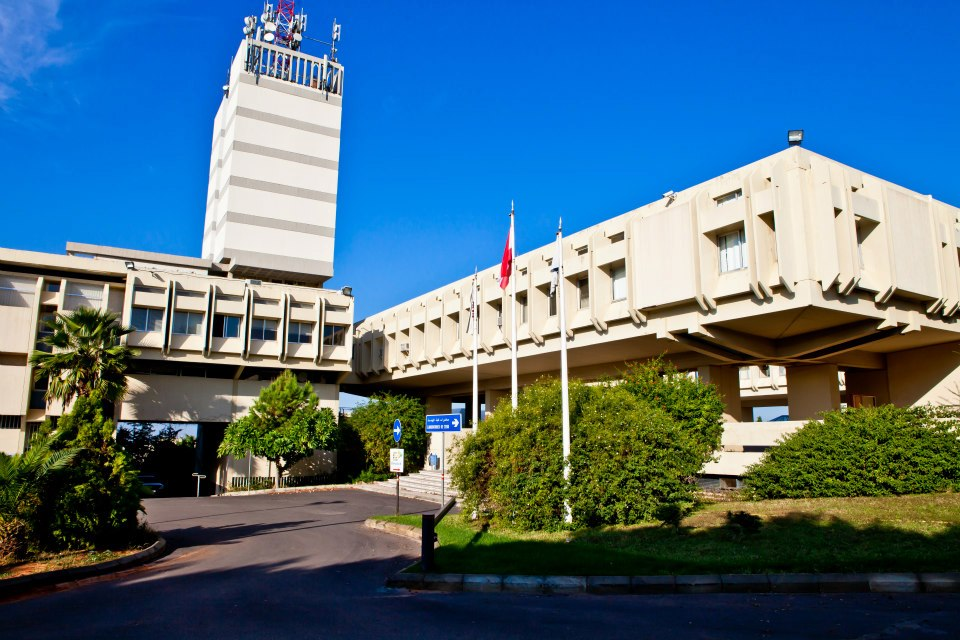
  The Sciences and Technology Campus (ESIB).
1. Faculty of Engineering and Architecture (French: Faculté d'ingénierie et d'architecture (FIA))
  1. Higher School of Engineering of Beirut (French: École superieure d'Ingenieurs de Beyrouth (ESIB)) established in 1948
  2. Higher School of Architecture of Beirut (French: École superieure d'architecture de Beyrouth (ESAR)) reestablished in 2023
  3. Higher School of Agricultural Engineering for Mediterranean Countries (French: École superieure d'ingénieurs d'agronomie méditerranéenne (ESIAM))
  4. Higher School of Food Engineering (French: École superieure d'ingénieurs agroalimentaires (ESIA))
  5. National Institute of Communication and Informatics (French: Institut national des télécommunications et de l'informatique (INCI))
2. Faculty of Sciences (French: Faculté des Sciences (FS))
- Other university centers
1. Japanese Academic Center (French: Centre académique japonais (CAJAP))
2. Professional Center for Mediation (French: Centre professionnel de médiation (CPM))
3. Confucius Institute (French: Institut Confucius (IC)) for the teaching of Chinese and the promotion of Chinese culture.
4. University for All (French: Université Pour Tous (UPT)). UPT provides advanced-level courses that are accessible to everyone in Lebanon, without any requirements or registration, and do not confer academic degrees.

The Social Sciences Campus (commonly known as "Huvelin" after its founder Paul-Louis Huvelin) has bachelor programs that prepare students to pursue advanced master's degrees in business and law schools in France, Germany, Italy, the Netherlands, Spain, other Member States of the European Union, the United Kingdom, the United States, Australia, and Canada.

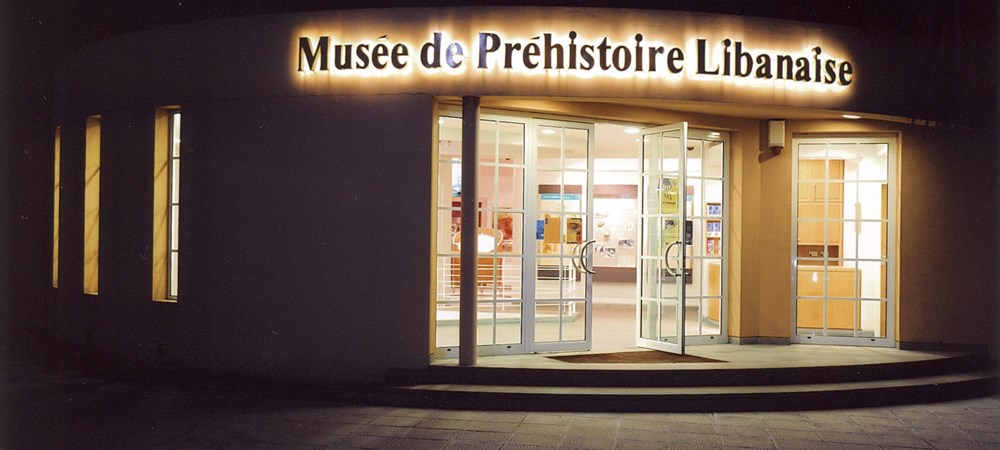
Façade of the Museum of Lebanese Prehistory.

Additionally, USJ has institutions such as the Center for Arab Christian Research and Documentation (French: Centre de documentation et de recherches arabes chrétiennes (CEDRAC)), the Museum of Lebanese Prehistory, the Mim Museum for minerals and fossils and its two theaters: Le Béryte and Théâtre Monnot. USJ houses the Bibliothèque Orientale, a research library of the Near East, and a repository for Oriental books and manuscripts.

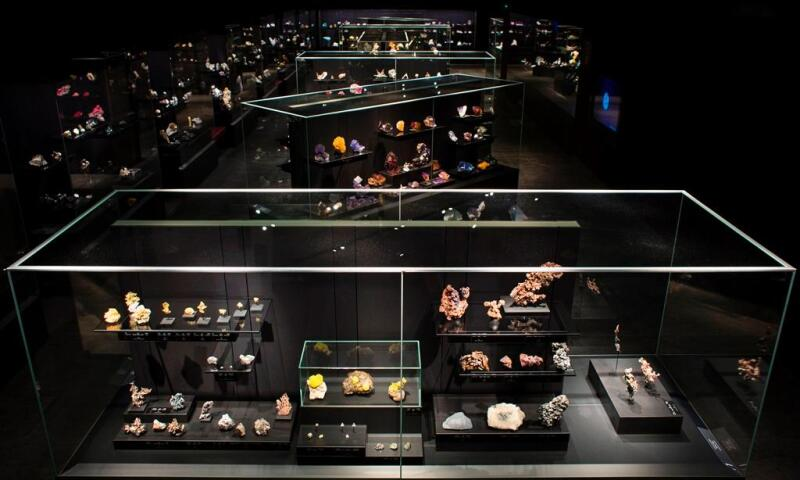
Inside USJ's Mim museum that houses more than 2000 rare minerals.

The business school has received an "excellent" ranking from Eduniversal.

== Campuses ==
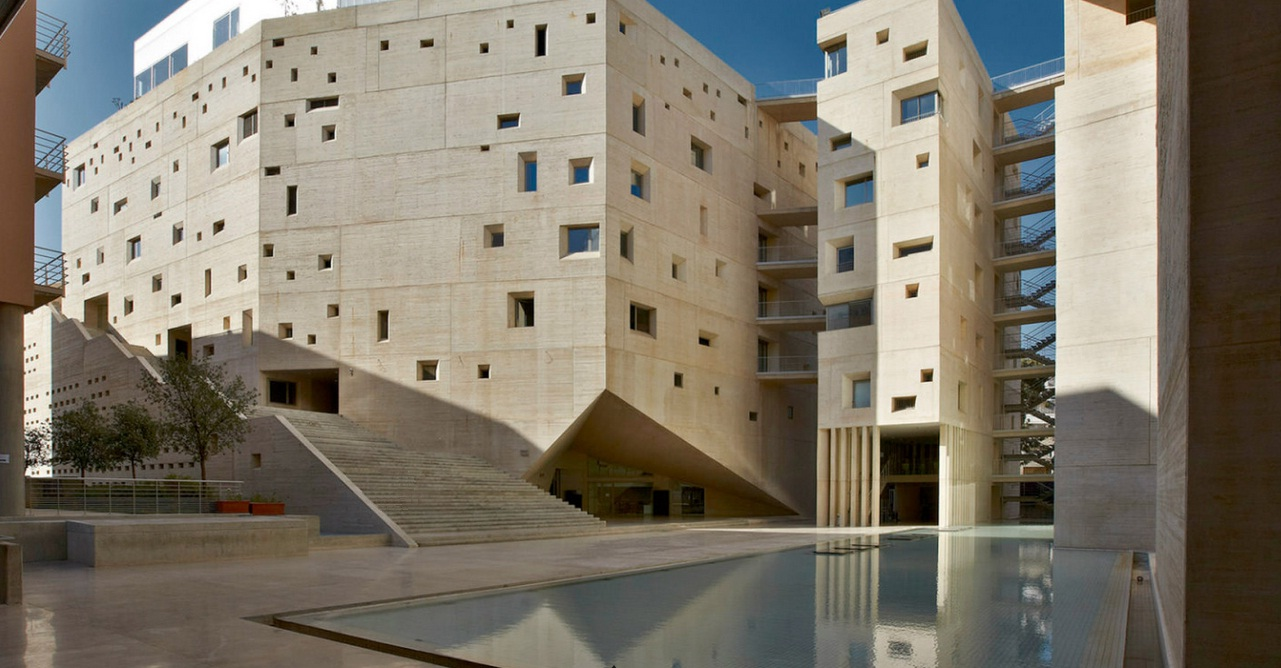
The Innovation and Sports Campus.

Saint Joseph University of Beirut campuses include:

- The Medical Sciences Campus (French: Campus des Sciences Médicales (CSM)) on Damascus Street.
- The Sciences and Technology Campus (French: Campus des Sciences et Technologies (CST)) in Mar Roukouz.
- The Social Sciences Campus "Huvelin" (French: Campus des Sciences Sociales (CSS)) on Monnot Street.
- The Humanities Campus (French: Campus des Sciences Humaines) on Damascus Street.
- The Innovation and Sports Campus (French: Campus de l'Innovation et du Sport (CIS)) on Damascus Street.

The three regional centers are located in Sidon (Southern Lebanon), Zahlé (Beqaa Valley), and Tripoli (Northern Lebanon).

In 2008, Saint Joseph University opened Saint Joseph University - Dubai, a branch that offers a Bachelor of Laws (LLB), a Master of Laws (LLM), and a Master of Arts (MA) in translation. The campus is located in the Dubai International Academic City. The university is accredited by the Knowledge and Human Development Authority of the Emirate of Dubai.

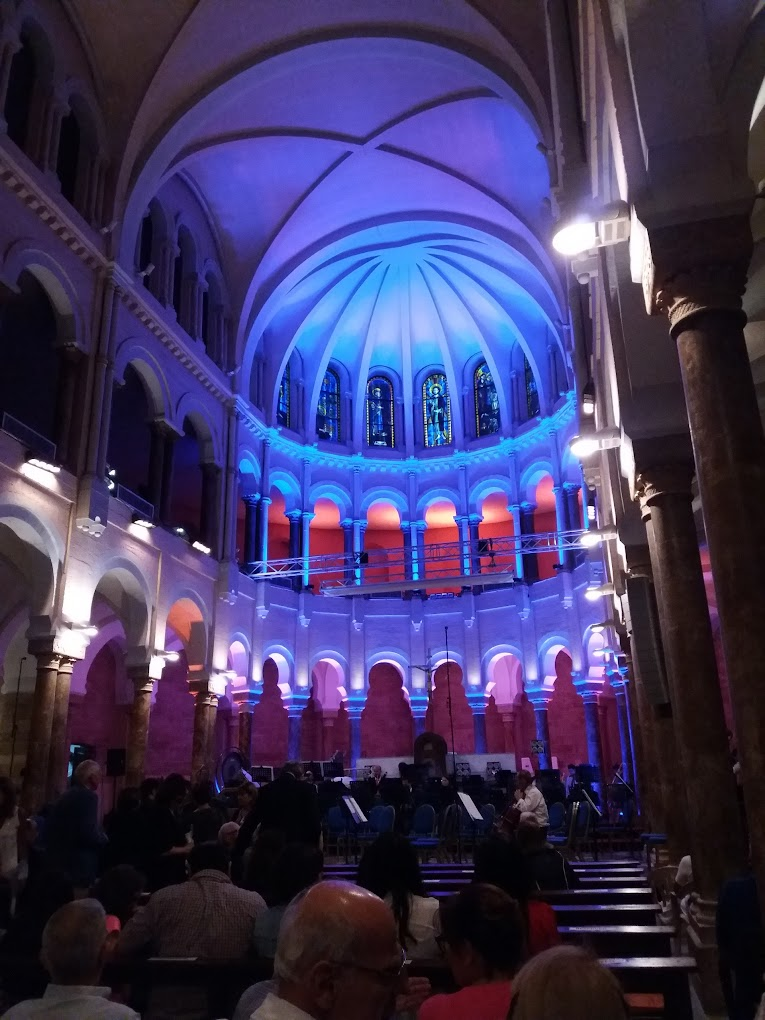
University Chapel, the Saint Joseph Church of the Jesuit Fathers on Monnot Street.

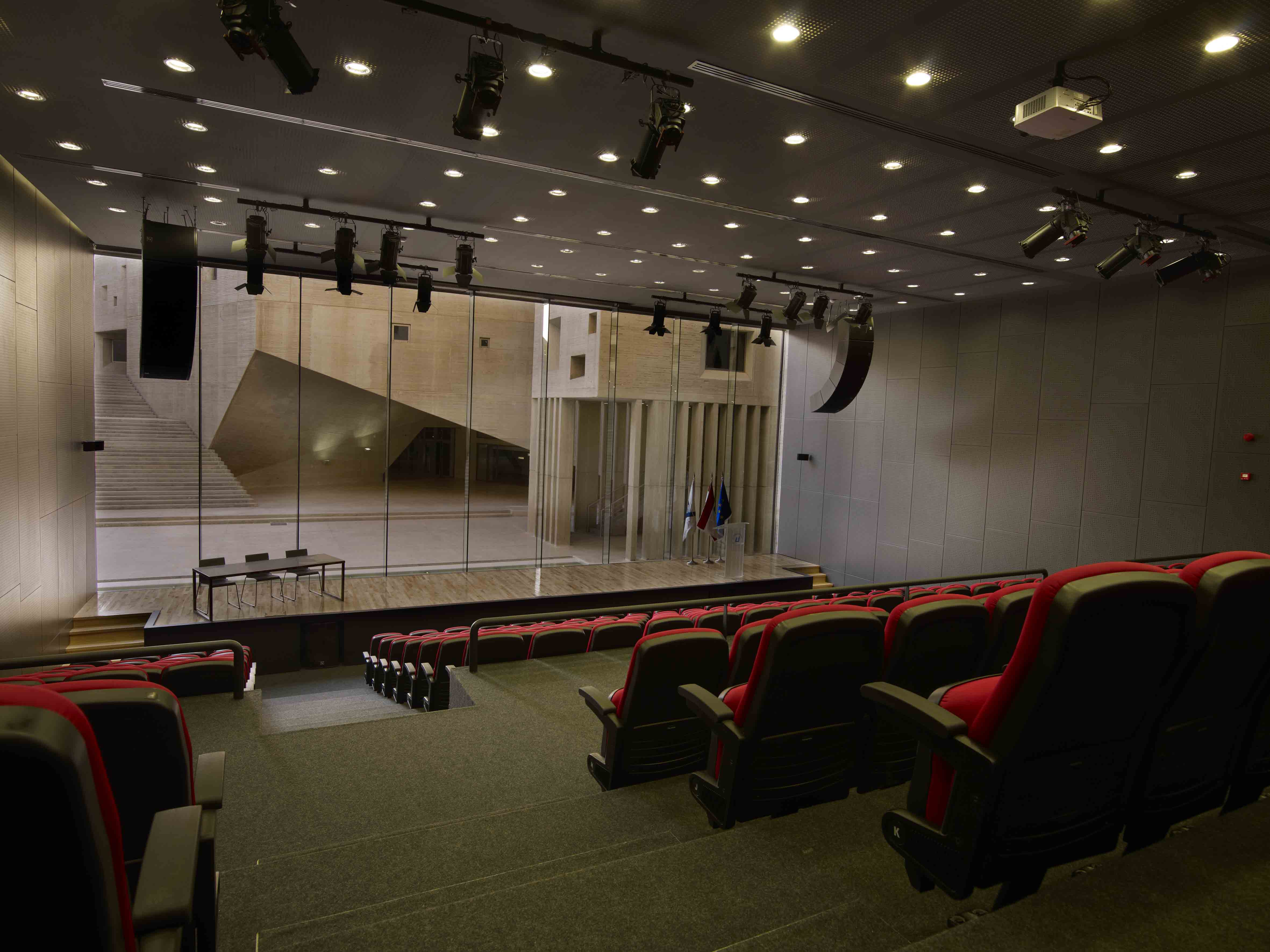
Auditorium in the Innovation and Sports Campus.

== Notable alumni and academics ==
USJ's graduates includes seven Lebanese Presidents, a Speaker of the Parliament of Lebanon, two Presidents of the Council of Ministers of Lebanon, Governors of the Banque du Liban, numerous legislators, ministers, judges, and high-ranking civil servants, including Commanders of the Lebanese Armed Forces and executives of the Internal Security Forces.

Lebanese presidents

- Camille Chamoun
- Charles Helou
- Elias Sarkis
- Amine Gemayel
- Rene Moawad
- Bachir Gemayel
- Elias Hrawi

Lebanese ministers (incomplete)

- Ziad Baroud
- Adnan Mansour
- Ibrahim Najjar
- Marie-Claude Najm
- Abdallah Victor Farhat
- Michel Murr
- Nicolas Nahas
- Tarek Mitri
- Khatchig Babikian
- Shakib Qortbawi
- Leila Al Solh
- Walid Daouk
- Marwan Hamadeh
- Salim Jreissati

Lebanese politicians (incomplete)

- Raymond Edde
- Samir Geagea (born 1952), Lebanese leader and politician
- Pierre Gemayel
- Samy Gemayel
- Antoine Ghanem
- Kamal Jumblatt
- Adnan Kassar
- Nayla Moawad
- Fouad Abou Nader
- Karim Pakradouni
- Michel Chiha
- Michel Pharaon
- Antoine Andraos
- Eddy Abillammaa

Foreign politicians

- Mohammad Habash
- Aram Karamanoukian
- Ahmad Mirfendereski
- Eliyahu Sasson
- Izzat Traboulsi
- Scott Sharp

Religious leaders

- Anthony Peter Khoraish
- Peter-Hans Kolvenbach
- George Riashi
- Wladyslaw Rubin
- Michel Sabbah
- Nasrallah Boutros Sfeir

Theologians and philosophers

- Louis Cheikho
- Jad Hatem
- Samir Khalil Samir

Ambassadors

- Farid Abboud
- Tawfiq Yusuf Awwad
- Assad Kotaite

Academics

- Aya Chacar
- René Chamussy

Architects

- Joseph Philippe Karam

Poets

- Bashir Copti
- Mansour Eid
- Nadia Tueni

Linguists

- Joseph E. Aoun

Musicians

- Marie Keyrouz
- Joelle Khoury
- Gabriel Yared

Directors

- Nadine Labaki
- Hiba Tawaji

Historians

- Jean Maurice Fiey
- Henri Fleisch
- Paul Huvelin
- Henri Lammens

Columnists

- Georges Corm
- Randa Habib
- Peter Scholl-Latour
- Pierre-Luc Séguillon

Writers

- Charles Corm
- Hassan Kobeissi
- Amin Maalouf
- Wajdi Mallat
- Thurayyā Malḥas
- Youakim Moubarac
- Ghassan Salamé
- Salah Stétié
- Omar Zaani

== See also ==
- List of universities in Lebanon
- Paul Huvelin
- Rue Huvelin
- Education in the Ottoman Empire
- List of Jesuit sites
- Law school of Berytus
- Christianity in Lebanon
- Bibliothèque Orientale (Saint Joseph University)
- Institut Français d'Archéologie de Beyrouth
