= Bashir Copti =

Palestinian–Lebanese teacher, poet, writer and publisher

Bashir Copti بشير قبطي
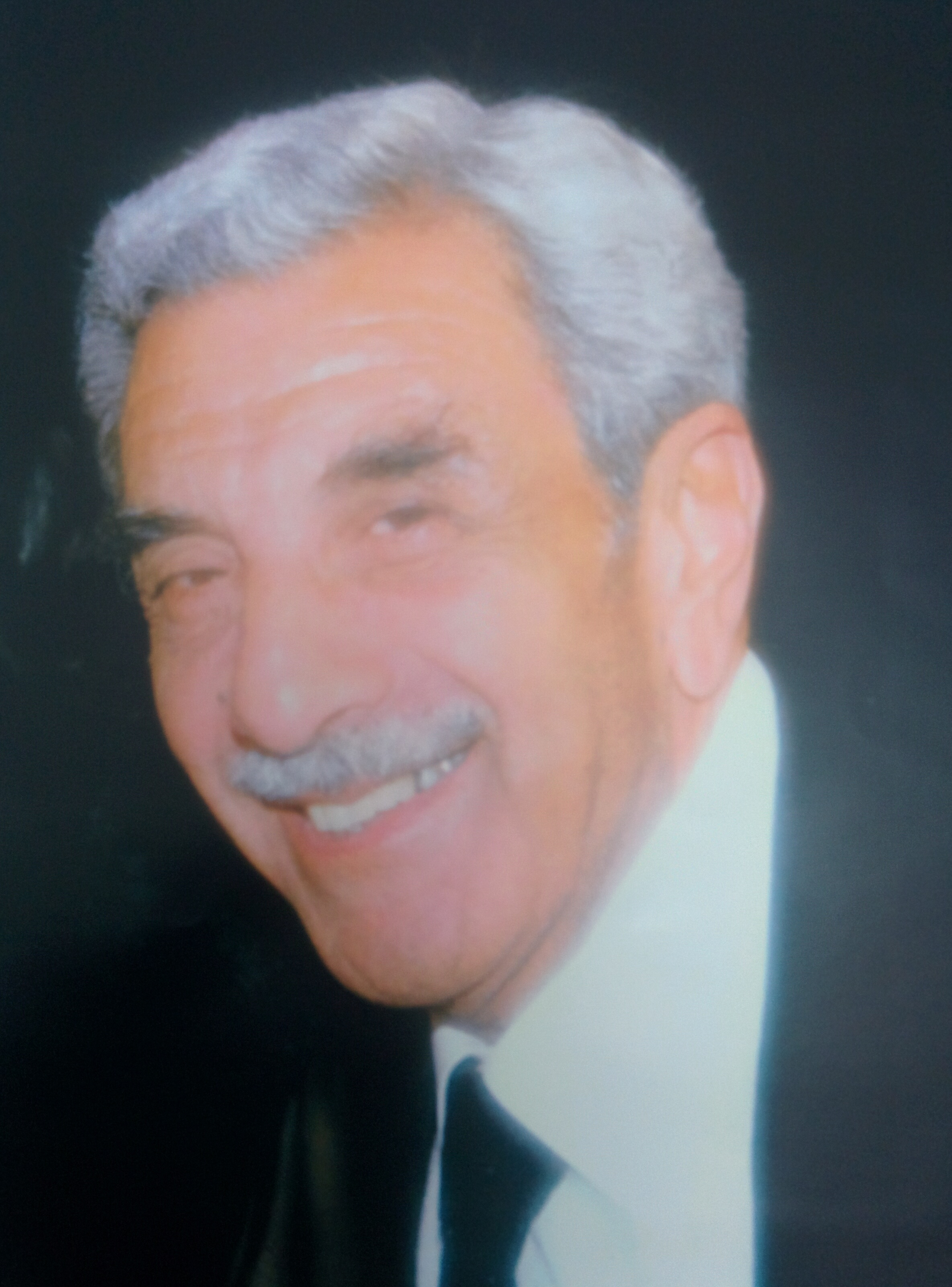
- Born: August 11, 1929; Jaffa, Palestine
- Died: March 20, 2016 (aged 86); Beirut, Lebanon
- Occupations: Teacher, poet, writer, publisher

Bashir Issa Copti (بشير عيسى قبطي) was a Palestinian–Lebanese teacher, poet, writer and publisher.

== Biography ==
=== Early life ===
He was born in Jaffa, Palestine on August 11, 1929, in a family of six boys and three girls. His father was a professor of Arabic and mathematics at the Jaffa Governmental School, while his mother was a well-educated woman knowledgeable of three languages including German.

He studied at Bishop Gobat's School in Jerusalem until 1948, when the war in Palestine escalated, and due to continuous aggression, he emigrated with his family to Amman, Jordan, where he was employed with the United Nations and then joined the Ministry of Finance. Due to financial and political inconvenience he emigrated again to Beirut in 1961 where he was employed at the National School of Choueifat now International School of Choueifat – Lebanon.

=== University studies and professional career ===
During his employment at the Choueifat School, he got the permission of the Director Mr. Ralph Boustany to continue his higher education, and successfully enrolled in Saint-Joseph's University by mid-1961. He continued his studies and earned his Diploma in Literature by 1964.

He tutored at the School of Choueifat Arabic language, Literature, Philosophy and History of Sciences of the Arabs to graduate classes for a period of fifteen years as he also tutored Mathematics to Intermediate Classes. He then moved to International College (IC) in 1977 to teach Philosophy and History of Science of the Arabs to Baccalauréat classes until 1998, when he retired. According to his student "Bashir Copti was a great teacher" and "gave meaning and purpose to us all"

=== Family ===
Copti is married to Violet Jureidini from the village Majdalouna, El Chouf, Lebanon and has three daughters, a son, and eleven grandchildren.

== Bibliography ==
=== Poetry ===
- Rebel Flame (اللهب الثائر)
- Frost Under the Sun ( صقيع تحت الشمس)
- Booklet of Spiritual Songs (كتاب ترانيم روحية)
- The Story of Creation ( قصة الخلق)

=== Books ===
- Philosophical Research (أبحاث فلسفية)
- History of Science of the Arabs (تاريخ العلوم عند العرب)
- Dictionary of Arabic Grammar & Parsing ( القاموس في الصرف والنحو والاعراب)
- Introduction to the History of Palestine Before Christ
- Christianity in the Pre-Islamic Poetry ( المسيحية في الشعر الجاهلي)
- Booklet for Devotional Prayers (كتاب صلوات تعبديّة)

=== Unpublished works ===
- Greek Philosophy(الفلسفة اليونانية)
- Collection of poetry (ديوان شعر)
