= Saint Joseph University - Dubai =

Saint Joseph University of Beirut in Dubai ("USJ-Dubai") was founded in 2008. It is a branch campus of the Saint Joseph University in Beirut, Lebanon. USJ-Dubai is accredited by the Knowledge and Human Development Authority of the United Arab Emirates. It is located in the Dubai International Academic City. It offers three degrees:

1. Bachelor of Laws (LLB) of USJ's Faculty of Law and Political Science.
2. Master of Laws (LLM) in Business Law a graduate degree of USJ's Faculty of Law and Political Science.
3. Master of Arts in translation of USJ's School of Translators and Interpreters.

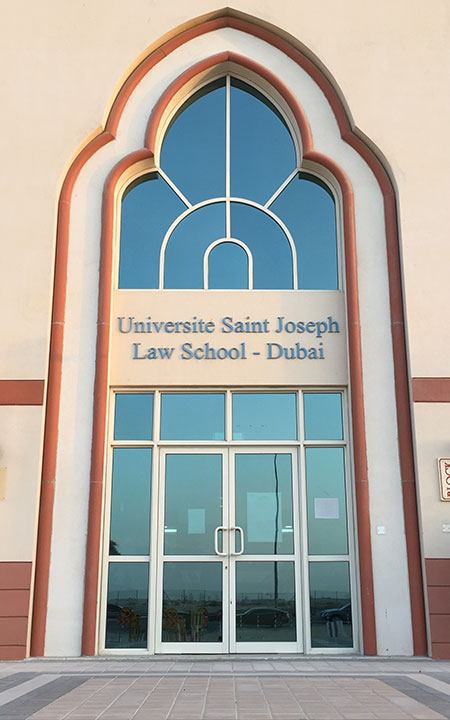
Façade of the USJ-Dubai Law School branch.

== History of the School of Translators ==
The School of Translators and Interpreters of Beirut (French: École de Traducteurs et d'Interprètes de Beyrout (ETIB)) was established in 1980 to train translators and interpreters using Arabic, French, and English as well as intercultural competencies by helping them to adapt to cultural differences, sharpen strong analytical and deductive skills, and develop professional judgment. ETIB is a member of International Standing Conference of University Institutes of Translators and Interpreters (CIUTI), the International Federation of Translators (IFT), is recognized by the International Association of Conference Interpreters (AIIC), and has a long-standing and close relation with the United Nations and the European Parliament.

The curriculum for a Master of Arts in Translation at USJ-Dubai includes the bases of translation from English into Arabic and Arabic into English. It also covers French and other Romance languages. It covers thematic concepts and terminologies related to the following specific fields: Literature, Journalism, Media, and Copywriting, Law, Economy, International Conferences/ Organizations, Banks, IT systems.

== See also ==
- List of Jesuit sites
