= Henri Seyrig =

French archaeologist (1895–1973)

- Born: Henri Arnold Seyrig; 10 November 1895; Héricourt, Haute-Saône, France
- Died: 21 January 1973 (aged 77); Neuchâtel, Switzerland
- Occupations: Archaeologist, historian and numismatist
- Spouse: Hermine de Saussure
- Children: Delphine Seyrig

Henri Arnold Seyrig (French: [sɛʁiɡ]; 10 November 1895 – 21 January 1973) was a French archaeologist, numismatist, and historian. From 1929, he served as General Director of Antiquities of Syria and Lebanon, and for more than twenty years he was director of the Institute of Archaeology of Beirut.

== Early life ==
Seyrig was born in Héricourt, France, into a liberal bourgeois industrial family. His family later moved to Mulhouse when his father joined the family business, and Seyrig was educated in German. He subsequently attended a French Protestant private boarding school in Normandy, the École des Roches. He continued his education by studying English at Oxford until 1914.

During World War I, Seyrig fought at Verdun and was decorated for his service. In 1917, he joined the Orient contingent in Salonika, where he had his first encounter with archaeology and decided to leave the family business. He subsequently enrolled at the Sorbonne, where he presented a thesis on the Homeric house. In 1922, he was admitted to the French School at Athens, where he spent seven years as a member and was later promoted to the office of secretary-general.

== Career ==
In 1929, on the recommendation of the leading Levantine archaeologist René Dussaud, Seyrig was appointed General Director of Antiquities of Syria and Lebanon, then under French mandate. He founded the French Institute of Archaeology in Beirut, which he directed for twenty years. In 1942, he moved to New York City, where he served as a special envoy of the Free French government until the end of World War II, after which he returned to Beirut.

Throughout the 1950s and 1960s, he was a visiting scholar at the Institute for Advanced Study in Princeton, New Jersey, spending part of each year in the United States. In 1967, he left Beirut and retired to Switzerland, while continuing, together with his wife, Hermine de Saussure, to spend part of the year in Princeton. Their children included the actress Delphine Seyrig and the composer Francis Seyrig.

Seyrig was awarded the medal of the Royal Numismatic Society in 1961.

== Publications ==
- Seyrig, Henri (June 1952). "A Helmet from Emisa". Archaeology. 5 (2). Archaeological Institute of America: 66–69. JSTOR 41663047.
- Seyrig, Henri (1952). "Le Casque d'Émèse". Les Annales Archéologiques de Syrie. II (1–2). Direction Générale des Antiquités de Syrie: 101–08.
- Seyrig, Henri (1952). "Antiquités Syriennes 53: Antiquités de la Nécropole d'Émèse (1^{re} partie)". Syria. XXIX (3–4): 204–250. doi:10.3406/syria.1952.4788. JSTOR 4390311. Archived from the original on 2019-05-02. (in French)
- Seyrig, Henri (1953). "Antiquités Syriennes 53 (suite): Antiquités de la Nécropole d'Émèse". Syria. XXX (1–2): 12–50. doi:10.3406/syria.1953.4859. (in French)
- Seyrig, Henri (1959). "Antiquités Syriennes 76: Caractères de l'histoire d'Émèse". Syria (in French). 36 (3–4).
