= Maurice Sartre =

French historian (born 1944)

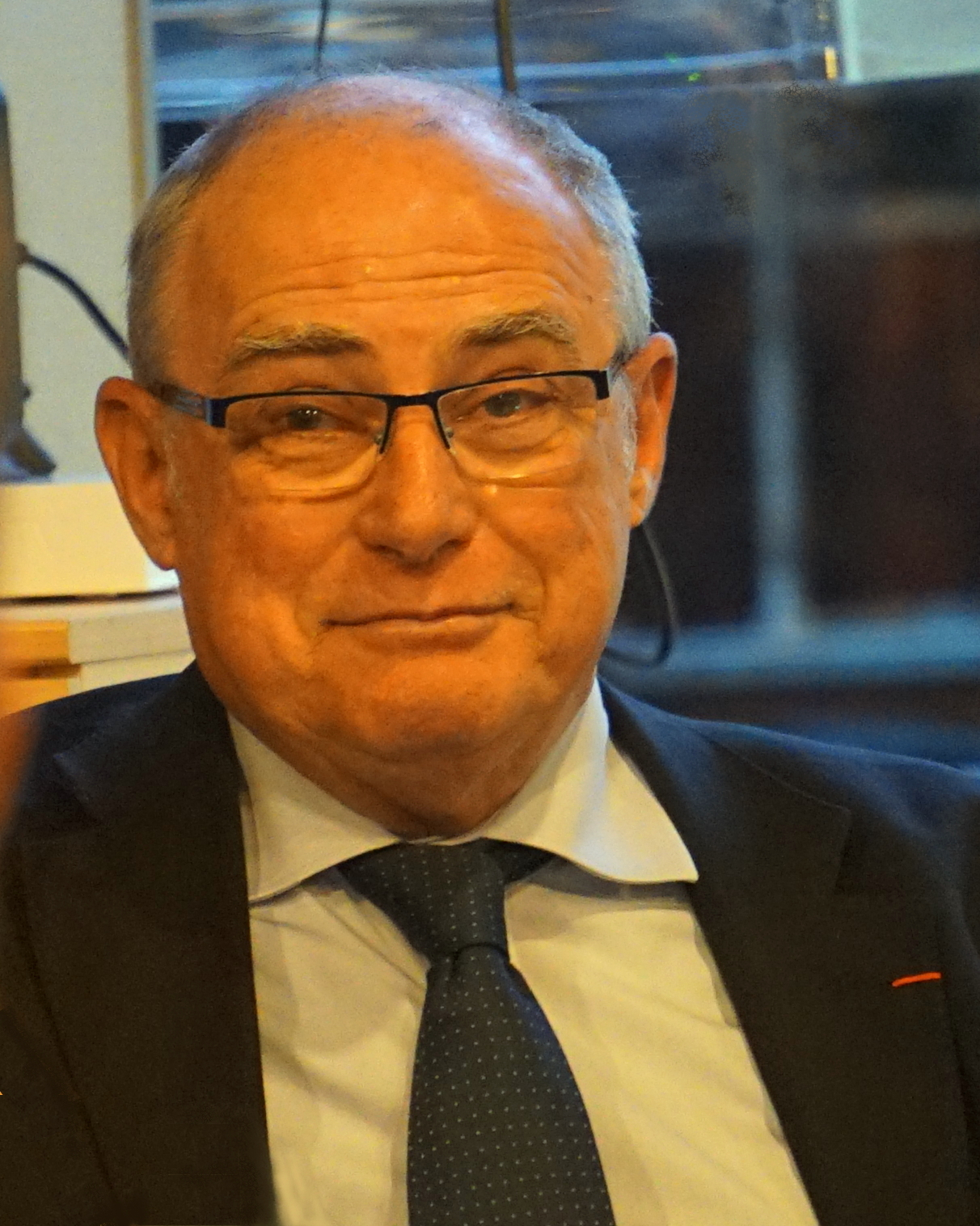
Maurice Sartre

Maurice Sartre (born 3 October 1944) is a French historian, an Emeritus professor of ancient history at the François Rabelais University, a specialist in ancient Greek and Eastern Roman history, especially the Hellenized Middle East, from Alexander to Islamic conquests.

== Contribution to the history of the ancient Near East ==
Maurice Sartre has written extensively on the history of the Middle East and the Levantine Sea in Ancient history. He also published several volumes of Greek and Latin inscriptions from Syria and Jordania. Currently associate researcher at the Institut français du Proche-Orient (IFPO), and starting from 1997 he was for many years the editor of Syria, the prestigious journal of archaeology, art and history published by this institution.

== Honours and awards ==
=== Honours ===
- Knight of the Legion of Honour
- Officier of the Ordre des Palmes académiques
- Knight of the Ordre des Arts et des Lettres

=== Awards ===
- 1986 : Prize Ambatiélos of the Académie des Inscriptions et Belles-Lettres
- 2002 : Prize Augustin-Thierry
- 2005 : Historia award
- 2007 : Prize Thiers of the Académie Française
- 2021 : Plottel Prize for Classical Studies of the Académie des Inscriptions et Belles-Lettres
- 2023 : Premio Cherasco Storia (Italy)

== Selected works ==
- 1982: Trois Études sur l'Arabie romaine et byzantine, Brussels, Latomus,
- 1985: Bostra des origines à l'Islam, Paris, Geuthner,
- 1985: Inscriptions grecques et latines de la Syrie, tome XIII/1 : Bostra, Geuthner,
- 1991: L’Orient romain. Provinces et sociétés provinciales en Méditerranée orientale d’Auguste aux Sévères (31 avant J.-C. – 235 après J.-C.), éd. Le Seuil.
- 1991: La Méditerranée antique : IIIe/IIIe, Armand Colin.
- 1993: Inscriptions grecques et latines de la Jordanie, t. IV : Pétra et la Nabatène méridionale, Beyrouth, IFAPO.
- 1995: L’Asie Mineure et l’Anatolie d’Alexandre à Dioclétien (IVe - IIIe), Armand Colin, coll. « U ».
- 2001: D'Alexandre à Zénobie : Histoire du Levant antique, IVe avant Jésus-Christ - IIIe après Jésus-Christ, éd. Fayard.
- 2002: La Syrie antique, coll. « Découvertes Gallimard » (nº 426), série Histoire. Paris: Gallimard.
- 2003: L'Anatolie hellénistique de l'Égée au Caucase (334–31 av JC), éd. Armand Colin.
- 2005: The Middle East under Rome, éd. Harvard University Press, Cambridge (Mass.), 2005 (partial US edition of D'Alexandre à Zénobie).
- 2006: Histoires grecques, éd. Le Seuil. Prix Thiers
- 2008: Palmyre : La cité des caravanes (with Annie Sartre-Fauriat), éd. Gallimard, coll. « Découvertes Gallimard » (nº 523), série Archéologie.
- 2009: Maurice Sartre, Annie Sartre-Fauriat, Patrice Brun (dir.), Dictionnaire du Monde grec antique, Paris, Larousse, coll. « In extenso ».
- 2011: Xavier Lafon, Jean-Yves Marc, Maurice Sartre, La Ville antique, Paris, Seuil, coll. « Points Histoire / Histoire de l'Europe urbaine¹ », ISBN 978-2-7578-2546-4.
- 2011: Inscriptions grecques et latines de la Syrie, tome XIII/2 : Bostra (Supplément) et la plaine de la Nuqrah, Beyrouth, Ifpo.
- 2013: Annie Sartre-Fauriat et Maurice Sartre Inscriptions grecques et latines de la Syrie, tome XV : Le Plateau du Trachôn, Beyrouth, Ifpo, 7, 2 vols.
- 2011: « Entretien : Maurice Sartre et le métier d'historien », Anabases, n° 13, p. 175–206.
