= Syria (journal) =

- Discipline: Area studies
- Language: English, French, German, Italian, Spanish
- Edited by: Maurice Sartre

Publication details
- History: 1920-present
- Publisher: Institut français du Proche-Orient
- Frequency: Annually

Standard abbreviations
- ISO 4: Syria

Indexing
- ISSN: 0039-7946
- LCCN: 36001381
- JSTOR: 00397946
- OCLC no.: 261344575

Links
- Journal homepage; Online access at Persée

Syria, subtitled Archéologie, art et histoire (until 2005 Revue d’art oriental et d’archéologie), is a multidisciplinary and multilingual academic journal covering the Semitic Middle East from prehistory to the Islamic conquest. It is published by the Institut français du Proche-Orient and was established in 1920.

For 19 years (1978–1997), archaeologist Ernest Will edited the journal. The current editor-in-chief is Maurice Sartre (Institut français du Proche-Orient). From 2011 to 2014 the journal was abstracted and indexed in Scopus.
