= Aya Chacar =

Lebanese-American business professor

Aya Chacar is a professor of business in the United States. She is currently the Ingersoll Rand Chaired Professor at Florida International University.

== Biography ==
Chacar was born in Lebanon where she studied engineering at the Ecole Supérieure des Ingénieurs de Beyrouth (E.S.I.B.). She earned a master's in business administration degree from Rensselaer Polytechnic Institute . Chacar completed her doctoral studies in Strategy and Organization at UCLA. She began her career at the London Business School then joined Florida International University (FIU) in 2003.

Chacar has studied and written several papers about Major League Baseball, where she has studied how players are traded and how that has affected the business. She has also studied effects of industry factors on innovation in the chemical industry.

In 2012, she was named to the chaired position of the Ingersoll Rand Professorship in International Business at FIU. She served a 5-year term as a Chairwoman and a Member of the Executive Committee of the International Management Division of the Academy of Management starting in 2014. She currently sits on the board of directors of Children of Lebanon.
