= Rue Monnot =

Street in Beirut, Lebanon

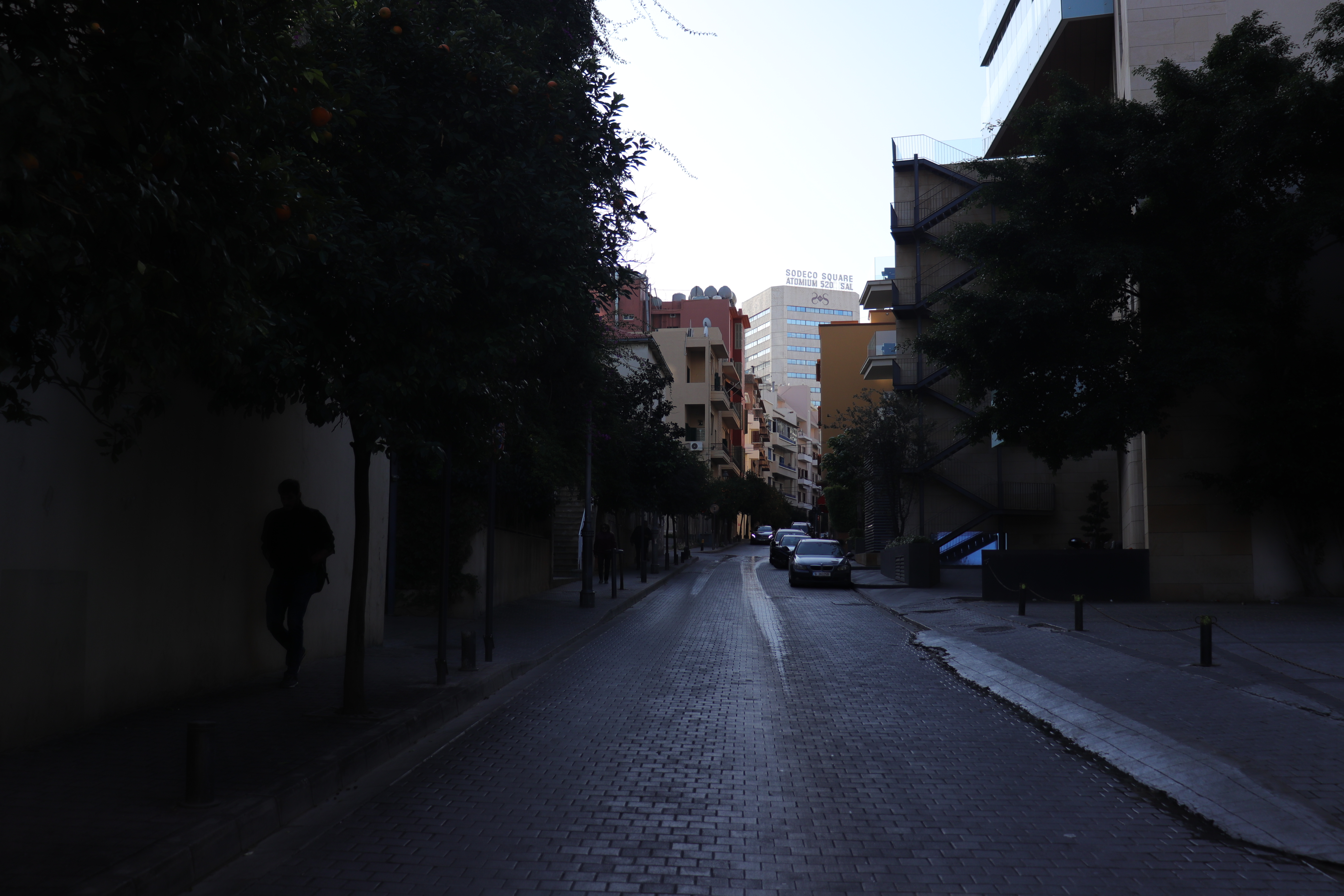
Rue Monot in the morning, looking East towards Sodeco Square

Rue Monnot (Arabic: شارع مونو, English: /mɒˈnoʊ/ mo-NOH, French: [ʁy mɔnɔ]), is a street in Beirut, Lebanon. It is located east of Beirut Central District, in the Sodeco neighborhood of the Achrafieh district, and named after Father Ambroise Monnot, a French Jesuit who founded the Saint Joseph University of Beirut in 1875.

Rue Monnot is a one-way cobblestone street that runs on a south–north axis, starting at Avenue de l'Independence and ending at Rue Charles Debbas. Attractions include a multitude of restaurants, shops, bars, and nightlife venues, and the street is alive with music every single night of the week. In 2004, Travel + Leisure named Rue Monnot as the best in the Middle East due to the dozens of bars and moody nightclubs lining both its sides. However it has today lost its post-Civil War prominence as the center of Beirut's Western-themed nightlife due to competition from other areas, such as Mar Mikhaël, Gemmayzeh, Hamra Street, Uruguay Street, and Badaro.
