= René Chamussy =

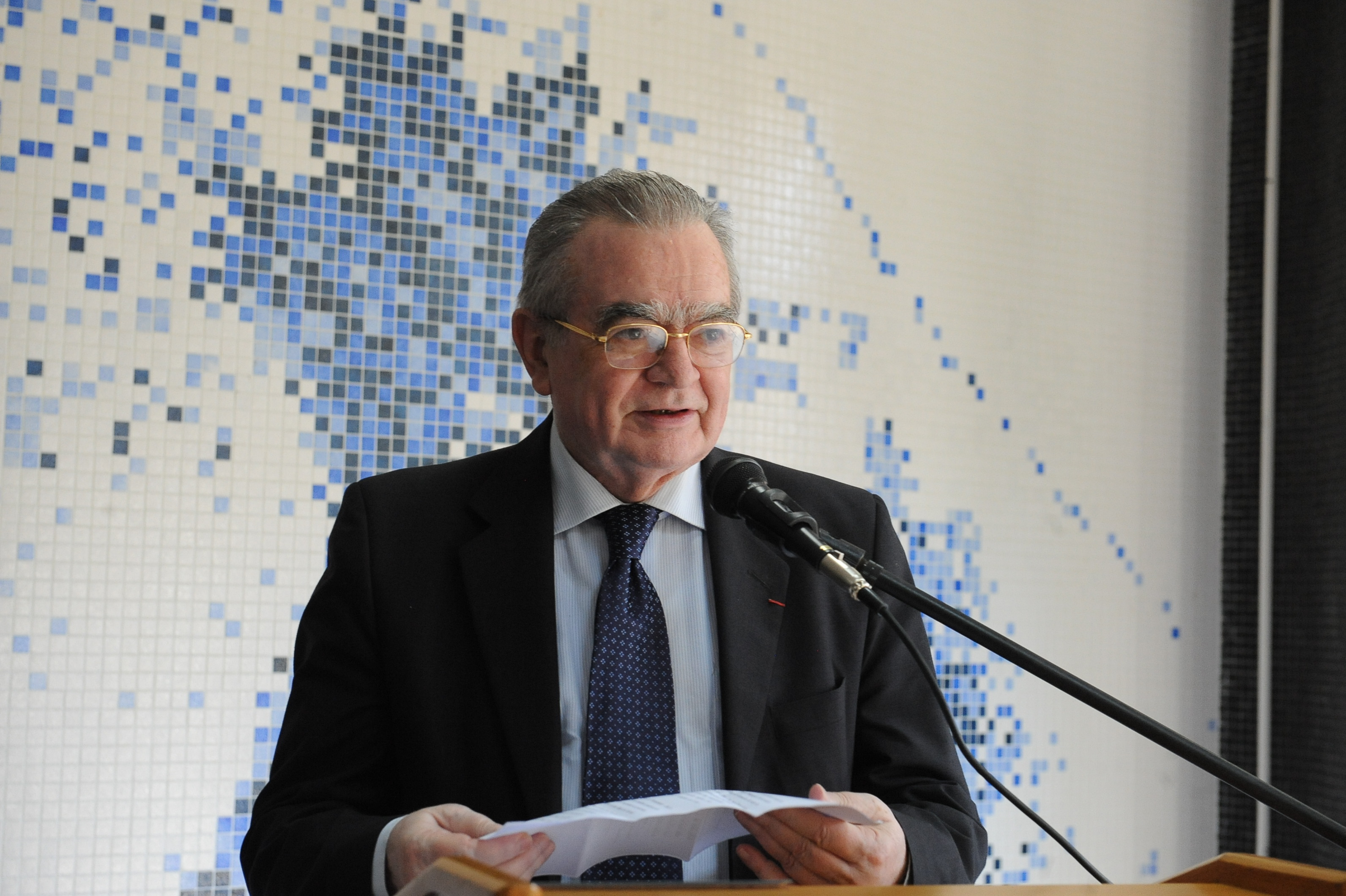
- Born: 15 December 1936; Lyon, France
- Died: 27 October 2016 (aged 79); Beirut, Lebanon
- Education: University of Paris; University of Lyon
- Occupations: Priest, academic administrator

René Chamussy (15 December 1936 – 27 October 2016) was a French-Lebanese Jesuit priest and academic administrator. He was the author of several books about Lebanon. He served as the rector of the Saint Joseph University in Beirut, Lebanon, from 2003 to 2012.

== Early life ==
Chamussy was born on 15 December 1936 in Lyon, France. He joined the Society of Jesus in 1956, at the age of 20.

Chamussy graduated from the University of Paris, where he received a Bachelor of Arts degree in French-Latin-Greek and English in 1959, and the University of Lyon, where he received a degree in theology in 1969. He emigrated to Lebanon in 1969, and became a Lebanese citizen in 2012.

== Career ==
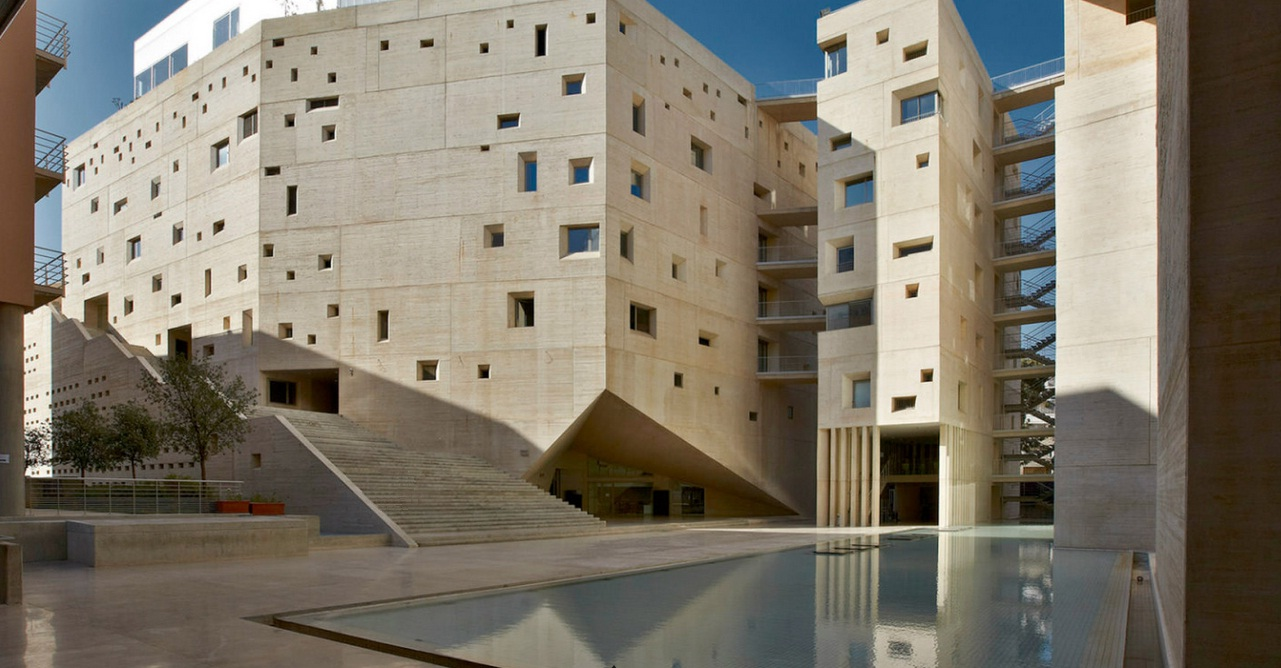
Saint Joseph University.

Chamussy taught at the Collège Notre Dame de Jamhour in Beirut in the 1970s. He joined the Saint Joseph University, also in Beirut, in 1977. He served as the director of its Language and Translator Institute from 1989 to 1995, the Dean of its College of Arts and Sciences from 1995 to 2000, and Vice Rector of Human Resources from 2000 to 2003. He then served as its rector from 2003 to 2012. He served as the chairman of its endowment holding company, Recherche et développement, from 2012 to 2016.

Chamussy was the author of several books about Lebanon. His first book, Chronique d’une guerre : Le Liban, 1975–1977, was reviewed by John P. Entelis, a professor of Political Science at Fordham University, in The Middle East Journal, and by French historian Jean Baubérot in Archives de sciences sociales des religions. Chamussy was the recipient of a prize from the Association France-Liban for it. Additionally, he published many articles in journals like La Civiltà Cattolica, Études, The Month, and Travaux et jours.

Chamussy was inducted into the National Order of Merit in 2001, and he was awarded the Legion of Honour in 2007. He was also inducted into the Order of Civil Merit by the King of Spain in 2012. He was also made a Commander of the Order of Isabella the Catholic in 2012.

== Death ==
Chamussy died on 27 October 2016 in Beirut, Lebanon. He was 79 years old. His funeral was held at the Eglise Saint-Joseph des Jésuites in Achrafieh, Beirut, Lebanon.

== Works ==
- Chamussy, René (1978). Chronique d'une guerre : Liban 1975–1977. Paris: Desclée. ISBN 9782718901190. OCLC 5434954.
- Chamussy, René (1984). Liban 1984 : d'un plan de sécurité à l'autre. Beirut: Université Saint-Joseph. OCLC 165419408.
- Chamussy, René (1986). Le temps des milices : Liban 1985. Beirut: Université Saint-Joseph. OCLC 715733684.
- Chamussy, René (1986). La chute : Liban 1986. Beirut: Université Saint-Joseph. OCLC 715733724.
- Chamussy, René (1988). Le verrouillage : Liban 1987. Beirut: Université Saint-Joseph. OCLC 715733778.
- Chamussy, René (2005). Les sept piliers de l'excellence. Beirut: Université Saint-Joseph. OCLC 829329603.
- Chamussy, René (2006). Les étudiants. Beirut: Université Saint-Joseph. OCLC 517412513.
- Chamussy, René (2007). Communauté universitaire et société. Beirut: Université Saint Joseph. OCLC 949133733.
- Buccianti-Barakat, Liliane; Chamussy, René (2012). Le Liban : géographie d'un pays paradoxal. Paris: Belin. ISBN 9782701162430. OCLC 796206723.
