= Antoine Andraos =

Lebanese politician

Antoine Andraos (Arabic: انطوان اندراوس, born 1950) is a Lebanese politician and a vice-president of the Movement of the Future. He received a diploma in civil engineering in 1973 from the Saint Joseph University in Beirut. In 1976, he traveled to France where he became close to Rafiq al-Hariri and was hired by his company. After 1993, when Hariri became prime minister, he headed the National Fund for the Displaced. He was elected member of the Lebanese Parliament in 1996 and reelected in 2000 and 2005, represented the Greek Orthodox seat.
