= Jean Starcky =

Abbé Jean Starcky
- Born: 3 February 1909; Mulhouse
- Died: 9 October 1988 (aged 79); Val-de-Grâce, Paris
- Education: Pontifical Biblical Institute, Rome; École Biblique, Jerusalem
- Occupation: priest
- Known for: specialist in Palmyrene Aramaic and Nabataean texts
- Notable work: early editor of the Dead Sea Scrolls
- Parents: Gabriel Starcky (father); Thérèse Gutknecht (mother)

Abbé Jean Starcky (3 February 1909 – 9 October 1988) was a French priest who was one of the early editors of the Dead Sea Scrolls. He studied at the Pontifical Biblical Institute in Rome and the École Biblique et Archéologique Française in Jerusalem. As a specialist in Palmyrene Aramaic and Nabataean texts he joined the international Manuscrits de la mer Morte team in January 1954.

== Origins of Jean Starcky ==
Jean Starcky was born on 3 February 1909 in Mulhouse (where a street bears his name), in the Haut-Rhin. He is the son of Gabriel Starcky and Berthe Thérèse Gutknecht. He died in Paris, in Val-de-Grâce, on 9 October 1988.

=== Youth ===
His father worked for the company DMC (Dollfus-Mieg et Compagnie) where he became authorized representative in Poland and Czechoslovakia. Jean Starcky's youth was spent in Mulhouse in France, in Switzerland in Territet, near Vevey in Switzerland, where his family lived during the First World War, in Mainz and in Prague.

=== Religious formation ===
He asserted his religious vocation very early on and despite his father’s reluctance, he began higher studies at the Société de l'oratoire de Jésus seminary in 1928 and then at the Institut catholique de Paris where he obtained a license in theology. He embarked on orientalist studies at the Institut Catholique de Paris and the Ecole Pratique des Hautes Etudes in Paris.

== Religious Vocation of Jean Starcky ==
He left the Oratory in 1935 with three other priests with whom he remained very close: Daniel Pézeril, Maurice Morel and Francis Connan.

=== Connections ===
- Ordained a priest in 1937, Daniel Pézeril (1911-1998) became a discreet and very active resistance fighter, saving several hundred people and in particular many Jews. He was decorated “Righteous Among the Nations”. A writer himself, he was close to men and women of letters, in particular to Georges Bernanos, of whom he was the last confessor. He will also be linked to other personalities such as Ernst Jünger, Julien Green or Florence Delay. He will become auxiliary bishop of Paris.
- Maurice Morel (1908-1991) was one of the promoters of sacred art, lecturer and painter. He was close to Max Jacob who introduced him to Pablo Picasso, Georges Braque, Fernand Léger and Henri Matisse. Intimate with Georges Rouault, their complicity allowed the publication of Stella vespertina (1947) and Miserere (1948). His own works are first influenced by Max Jacob, then by Jean Bazaine and Alfred Manessier. He quickly became part of what was called "lyrical abstraction" of the New School of Paris. In 1957 he was commissioned by Pope Pius XII to consider the creation of a museum of modern art and he helped introduce modern religious art to this museum in the Vatican, inaugurated in 1973.
- Father Francis Connan assisted Father Daniel Pézeril in the creation of the priestly community of Saint Séverin, he became parish priest of Saint Roch Church in Paris (1970-1979).

=== Palmyra specialist ===
John Starcky was ordained priest of the diocese of Paris on 21 April 1935. He left the same year for the Pontifical Institute in Rome, where he studied in 1935-36 and in 1937-38, he specialized in Aramaic.

In 1936/37 he received a scholarship from the Académie des Inscriptions et Belles-Lettres at the French Biblical and Archaeological School in Jerusalem. He wrote his memoir for the Academy on Neolithic pottery in Jericho.

It was during this time that he came into contact with the great archaeological sites of the Near East such as Palmyra. Besides Palestine, he was interested in sites in Lebanon, Syria and Egypt. He returned a year later to Beirut, where he taught Hebrew and the Old Testament at Saint Joseph University (1938-1941).

He was also parish priest of Palmyra when the French troops from Vichy stationed in the oasis. It was during this time that he met two other Alsatian intellectuals and archaeologists: Henri Seyrig and Daniel Schlumberger.

== Engagement in the Free French Forces ==
The Vichy army in Lebanon and Syria, having been defeated by the English army and by the troops of Free France in June 1941, Beirut being taken in July, Jean Starcky enlisted on 7 August as chaplain in the Forces Free French.

=== The war ===
Integrated into the 1st Marine Infantry Battalion, he became military chaplain of the Beirut garrison and was then attached to the 11 March Battalion (BM 11) composed mainly of African infantrymen. It left Palestine for Libya on 14 April 1942. The battalion took part in the Battle of El Alamein (October–November 1942).

In 1943 the 1st French Free Division (DFL), to which BM 11 belonged, crossed Cyrenaica and Tripolitania to reach southern Tunisia. On 27 November 1943 Jean Starcky became chaplain of the BIMP, (the Marine and Pacific Infantry Battalion) which notably included Tahitians, Caledonians and Canaques.

With the 1st DFL he landed in Italy, in Taranto near Naples, on 19 April 1944. He took part in the Battle of Garigliano (10–26 May 1944) then entered Rome in June. On 11 June the division captured Montefiascone on Lake Bolsene and pursued the enemy towards Siena and Florence. On 30 June 1944, on the airfield at Marcianise (near Naples), General de Gaulle awarded him the Order of Liberation.

=== The liberation of France ===
With the BIMP Jean Starcky landed in Provence, at Cavalaire, on 17 August 1944.

He took part in the fights in front of Hyères and Toulon. The division moved up towards Lyon, then reached Burgundy, arrived in Dijon on 16 September, then left for Alsace via Ronchamp. The battle of Belfort and Mulhouse began on 14 November.

In December 1944 the division participated victoriously in the defense of Strasbourg, liberated by the 2nd AD and which the Germans were trying to take back. Once Strasbourg was saved, the division took part in the liberation of Colmar in January 1945.

After these fights in Alsace the 1st DFL had the disappointment of not continuing the fights in Germany. On 3 March 1945 it was sent to the south of the Alps, north of Nice, in the Authion massif, to reduce pockets of enemy resistance.

On 11 April 1945 Jean Starcky was wounded in the face. He was demobilized on 6 September 1945. Throughout the war he distinguished himself by bringing the last rites to many wounded, even to those remaining between the lines.

=== Decorations ===
Sub-lieutenant then captain, still chaplain, he will receive the Legion of Honor (officer), the Croix de Guerre with palm and silver star, the colonial medal with "Libya" and "Tunisia" clip, the Silver Star (USA ).

The quote of 20 November 1944, when he became a Companion of the Liberation, evokes a "military chaplain of high class, uniting on a much higher level the serenity of his evangelical faith with a quiet courage and boundless abnegation which made, during the fighting of 11, 12 and 16 May 1944, the admiration of the BIMP to which it was posted ”.

General Garbay, who commanded the 1st DFL, mentioned in a quotation: "a chaplain of the BIMP, legendary for his bravery, his tireless dedication and his kindness".

== Career ==
Throughout his life, he held various teaching and research positions:

- Professor of the New Testament at the Catholic Institute of Paris.
- Professor of Scripture and Hebrew at Saint Joseph University in Beirut, while being parish priest of Palmyra (1938-1941)
- Boarder (1946-1949), then deputy director (1968-1971) of the French Institute of Archeology in Beirut.
- Researcher, then director (from 1966), at the National Center for Scientific Research (1949-1978).

=== Archaeologist and epigraphist after 1945 ===
After 1945 he taught at the Grand Séminaire de Meaux and then, from 1948, at the Institut Catholique de Paris where he was professor of New Testament exegesis.

He returned to the Middle East where he was one of the first residents of the French Institute of Archeology in Beirut, founded in 1946 by Henri Seyrig.

In 1946, the latter entrusted him with the edition of the inscriptions which had just been discovered at the Agora of Palmyra and associated him with the preparation of the Collection of tesserae of Palmyra (1955). Jean Starcky entered the CNRS in 1949.

In October 1952 he joined the international team responsible for deciphering the Dead Sea Scrolls or the Qumran Scrolls. This French team was led by Father Roland de Vaux and was hosted by the French Biblical and Archaeological School of Jerusalem and the Palestine Archaeological Museum.

In September 1952, cave 4 of Qumran was discovered. John Starcky was entrusted with the decryption and publication of the papyri written in Nabataean, a language close to Palmyrenian Aramaic from this cave 4. He also studied Petra and Palmyra. He published articles on Palmyra as well as on Petra and Nabatene. In 1966 he became research director at the CNRS until 1977, when he received the institution's silver medal. When he retired in 1977, he entrusted the publication of the Dead Sea Scrolls, which he had not yet deciphered, to Abbots Maurice Baillet and Emile Puech.

=== Work at the French Institute of Archeology in Beirut ===
Epigraphist, archaeologist, Aramaic specialist, exegete, mastering many languages, Jean Starcky was deputy director of the French Institute of Archeology in Beirut from 1968 to 1971.

At this time, Daniel Schlumberger, the headmaster, was ill (1969). He helped the latter to publish his work: The Hellenized Orient (1969 and 1970) and he launched the excavations of Tell Arqa in Lebanon.

Between 1969 and 1971 he supported the Petra photogrammetric surveys with the IGN (National Geographic Institute).

=== Bible work ===
Jean Starcky took part in translations of the Bible, to that known as Cardinal Liénart (1955) then to that of Jerusalem, for the Book of the Maccabees (1961). He would have been one of the initiators of the ecumenical Bible, the TOB (Ecumenical Translation of the Bible) published in 1975. He participated very early in the magazine Bible et Terre Sainte, magazine which became Le Monde de la Bible.

With Canon Lecomte they founded, with their collections, the Bible and Holy Land Museum, which they gave to the association of the same name. He set up this museum in Paris, in the premises of the Saint Jacques du Haut-Pas church, then at the Institut Catholique de Paris.

== Publications ==
- Guide to Palmyra, 1941
- “Recueil de tessères de Palmyre”, Harald Ingholt, Henri Seyrig and Jean Starcky, followed by Linguistic Remarks by André Caquot, in the Revue de l'histoire des religions, Paris, 1955
- Jean Starcky participates in the edition of the so-called Cardinal Liénart's Bible, 1955
- "Palmyra", Supplement to the Dictionary of the Bible, 1960, Jean Starcky
- John Starcky contributes to the Jerusalem Bible (for the Book of the Maccabees) and the one-volume edition, 1961
- Jean Starcky "The four stages of Messianism at Qumrân" in Revue Biblique, 1963
- Jean Starcky "Petra and the Nabatene", in the Supplement to the Dictionary of the Bible, 1964
- Participates in the making of the Ecumenical Bible, the TOB, 1975
- and Michel Gawlikowski, Palmyre, Paris, 1985.
- Jean Starcky, “Nabatean Inscriptions and the History of Southern Syria and Northern Jordan” in Hauran I, Archaeological Research on Southern Syria in the Hellenistic and Roman Period, ed. by J.M. Dentzer, vol. 1, Paris, 1985
- Palmyra, Coll. “The Old Orient illustrated” no 7, A. Maisonneuve, Paris, 1952; revised and expanded edition of new discoveries with the collaboration of Michel Gawlikowski, Paris 1985.

== See also ==
- Discoveries in the Judaean Desert

== Notes and references ==
- File of Jean Starcky as companion of the liberation.
- Page of Fr. Starcky of the Amicale de la 1re French Libre Division.
- Biographical sketch in François Laplanche, The Crisis of Origin - The Science of the Gospels and History in the Twentieth Century, Albin Michel, 2006, p. 647-648, notice which itself summarizes the Revue de Qumran no 15, 1991, p. 11-20.
- Émile Puech, “In Memoriam. Abbot Jean Starcky ”(1909-1988) in the Revue de Qumrân, Tome 14, vol.53, 1989. p. 3-6.
- Journal La Croix, 14 October 1988, p. 8 and p. 23.
- The Oxford encyclopedia of archaeology in the Near East: Volume 5 Eric M. Meyers, American Schools of Oriental Research - 1997 "In Memoriam: Father Jean Starcky, 1909-1988." Annual of the Department of Antiquities of Jordan 32 (1988): 9-11. See also "A Selected Bibliography of Jean Starcky" (pp. 12–14).
- Encyclopedia of the Dead Sea Scrolls: N-Z Lawrence H. Schiffman, James C. VanderKam - 2000 "L'Abbe Jean Starcky (1909-1988)." Memorial Jean Starcky I. Textes et Etudes qumraniens, edited by Emile Puech and Florentino Garcia Martinez. Revue de Qumran 15 (1991), 1-9. Puech, Emile. "Jean Starcky. Bibliographie.
- Holman QuickSource Guide to the Dead Sea Scrolls - Page 395 Craig A. Evans - 2010 Starcky, Jean : Father Jean Starcky (1909–1988) studied Semitics and Oriental Languages at several institutions, including the Pontifical Biblical Institute in Rome and the École Biblique et Archéologique Française in Jerusalem.
- Secrets of the Dead Sea scrolls - Page 456 Randall Price - 1996 January 1954 — Fr. Jean Starcky, a specialist in Palmyrene Aramaic texts, joins the International Team to help with nonbiblical Aramaic documents, as well as a few Hebrew documents.
