= Institut français du Proche-Orient =

French research center

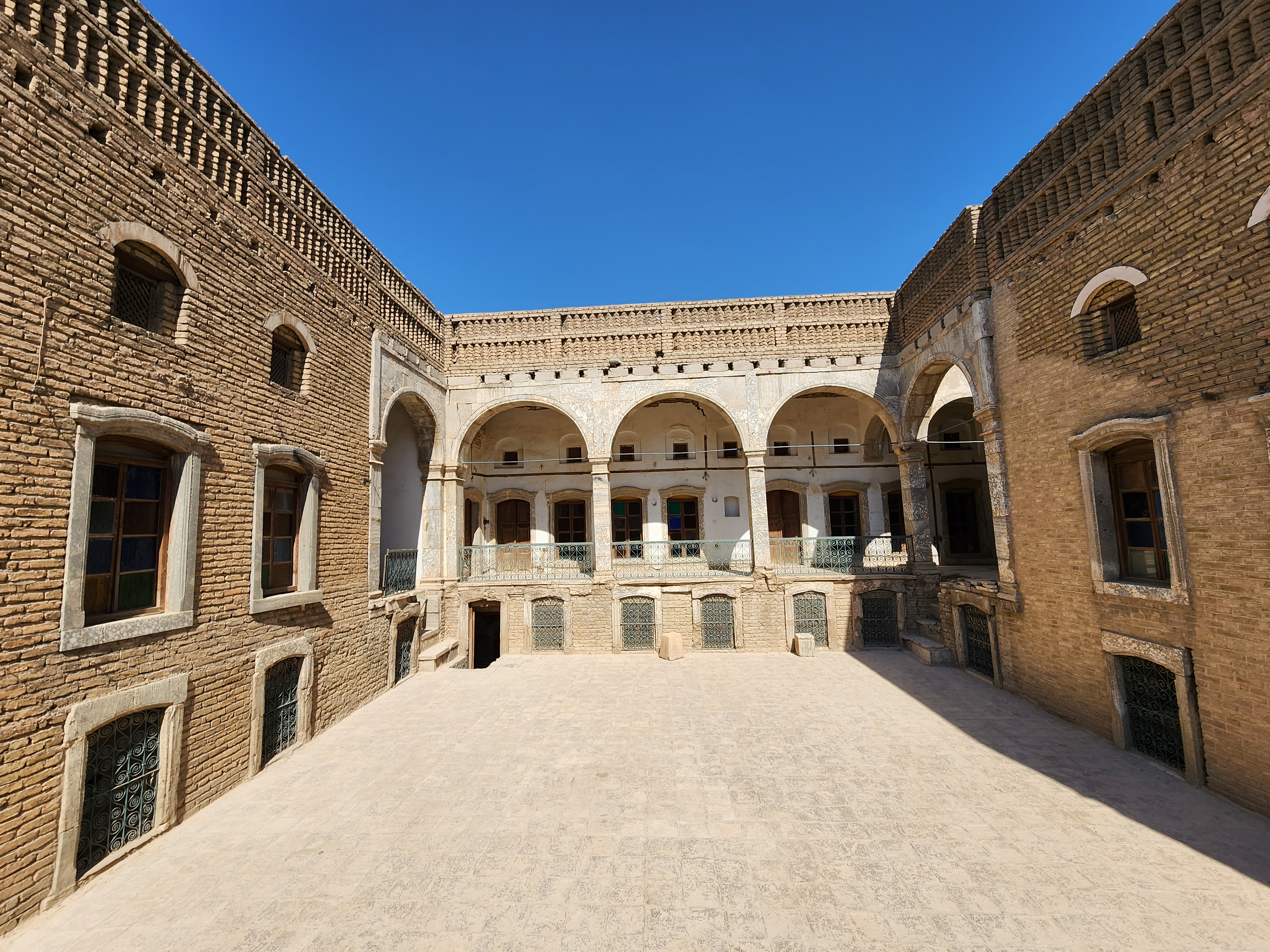
The French Institute for the Near East (l’Institut Français du Proche-Orient), Erbil Citadel, Erbil Governorate, Iraqi Kurdistan

The French Institute of the Near East (French: Institut français du Proche-Orient, IFPO) is a French social science research institute with locations in Jordan (Amman), Lebanon (Beirut), with additional operations in Iraq and Palestine, and formerly in Syria (Damascus and Aleppo) until 2011. It was founded in 2002.

Operating under the French government's Ministry of Europe and Foreign Affairs (French: Ministère de l'Europe et des Affaires étrangères, MEAE) portfolio, the IFPO is part of a network of French research centers abroad.

== History ==
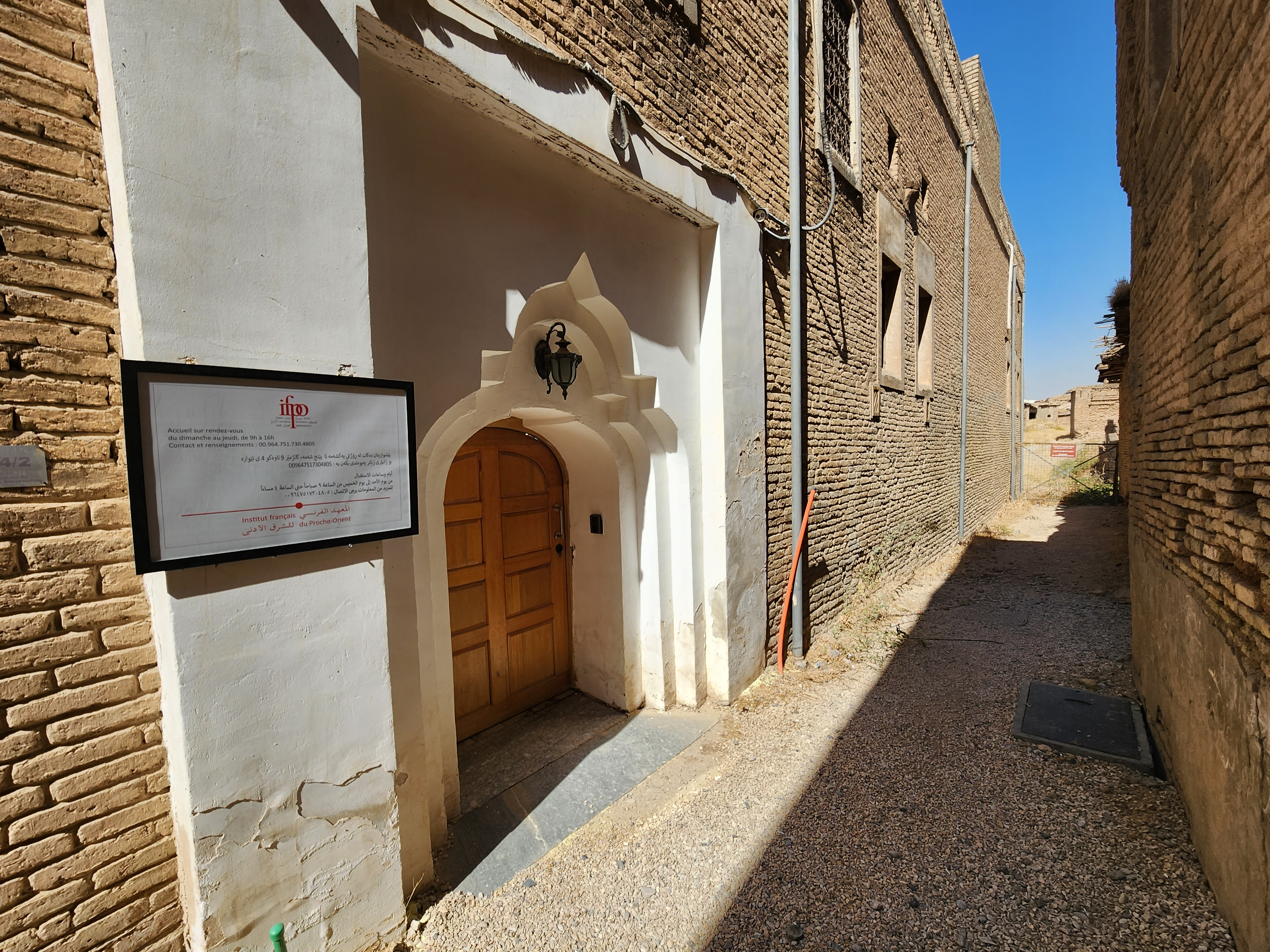
The IFPO's center at Erbil Citadel

The IFPO was established in 2002, combining three existing French institutes in the area: IFEAD (French Institute for Arab Studies in Damascus, established in 1922), IFAPO (French Institute of Near Eastern Archaeology, established in Syria and Lebanon in 1946), and CERMOC (Centre for Study and Research on the Contemporary Middle East, established in Lebanon in 1977 and Jordan in 1988). The IFPO holds the status of a "Joint Entity of French Research Institutes Abroad" (UMIFRE no6, Unité Mixte des Instituts français de recherche à l'étranger) and is under the aegis of the French Ministry of Foreign Affairs and the CNRS (French National Centre for Scientific Research). In 2010, the IFPO opened a research center in the Erbil Citadel in the Kurdistan Region of Iraq.

== Organization ==
The institute is organized into three scientific departments: Archaeology and Ancient History (Director: Carole Roche-Hawley); Arab Studies, Medieval and Modern (Director: Iyas Hassan); and Contemporary Studies (Director: Matthieu Rey).

The institute recruits researchers from France, Syria, Lebanon, Jordan, and other countries around the world.

Researchers are selected to participate in various academic projects initiated by the institute for a maximum duration of three years. The IFPO is also open to young researchers (PhD candidates, grant holders, etc.) of all nationalities. The duration of their stay varies according to the individual.

The institute also awards some short-term grants for limited projects.
