= Cabinet of Amin Hafez =

Lebanese cabinet between April and June 1973

Hafez Cabinet
- Cabinet of Lebanon

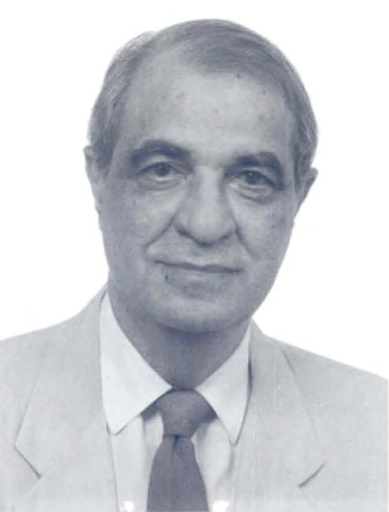
- Prime Minister Amin Hafez
- Date formed: 25 April 1973
- Date dissolved: 18 June 1973

People and organisations
- Head of state: Suleiman Frangieh
- Head of government: Amin Hafez
- Deputy head of government: Gouad Ghosn
- No. of ministers: 17
- Ministers removed: 11

History
- Predecessor: Sixth Cabinet of Saeb Salam
- Successor: Cabinet of Takieddin Solh

The cabinet led by Prime Minister Amin Hafez was one of the short-lived cabinets of Lebanon. It was inaugurated on 25 April 1973, succeeding the cabinet led by Saeb Salam who resigned on 10 April 1973. The tenure of the Hafez cabinet ended on 18 June 1973 following the Parliament's motion of no confidence.

== Overview ==
Prime Minister Saeb Salam and his cabinet resigned on 10 April 1973 when the Mossad agents attacked the headquarters of Palestinians in Beirut and killed three Palestinians who were leading members of the Fatah. Upon this incident due to pressures from the Sunni community Salam requested the dismissal of the commander of the Lebanese army, Iskandar Ghanem, which was not accepted by the President Suleiman Frangieh. Because Ghanem was a close ally of Frangieh and a Maronite.

Frangieh first asked Rashid Karami and then Abdallah Yafi to establish a new cabinet, but both declined his proposal. Then he asked Amin Hafez to form the cabinet, and he was given the task on 18 April 1973. Hafez was an academic and did not hold any cabinet post, but had been a member of the Lebanese Parliament since 1960 representing Tripoli. At the Parliament he was part of the group headed by Rashid Karami. Hafez had good relations with other political leaders such as Kamal Jumblatt, Kamel Asaad and the outgoing Prime Minister Saeb Salem who supported his appointment. In fact, it was Kamal Jumblatt who proposed his premiership to Suleiman Frangieh. However, just before the announcement of the cabinet members the violence between the Lebanese army and the Palestine Liberation Army intensified due to the Israeli attack mentioned above. Because of these tensions the leading supporters of Hafez demanded his resignation to reduce the capacity of President Frangieh to attack against Palestinians. Hafez did not approve their request stating that as a prime minister he could diminish these attacks.

== Cabinet members ==
The cabinet was composed of 17 members which were announced on 25 April. Only six members were newcomers, and the others served in the previous cabinet. Their distribution based on the sectarian affiliation was as follows: Armenian Orthodox (1); Druze (1); Greek Catholic (2); Greek Orthodox (2); Maronite (4); Shiite (3) and Sunni (4).

== List of ministers ==
The cabinet was made up of the following members:

Portfolio	Minister	Took office	Left office	Party
Prime Minister	Amin Hafez	25 April 1973	18 June 1973	Independent
Deputy Prime Minister	Fouad Ghosn	25 April 1973	18 June 1973	Marada Movement
Minister of Finance	Fouad Naffah	25 April 1973	18 June 1973	Independent
Minister of Interior	Bashir Al Awar	25 April 1973	18 June 1973	Independent
Minister of Justice	Kazem Khalil	25 April 1973	18 June 1973	National Liberal Party
Minister of Foreign Affairs and Emigrants	Khalil Abou Hamad	25 April 1973	18 June 1973	Independent
Minister of National Defense	Fouad Ghosn	25 April 1973	18 June 1973	Marada Movement
Minister of Housing and Cooperatives	Michel Sassine	25 April 1973	18 June 1973	Independent
Minister of National Education and Fine Arts	Edmond Rizk	25 April 1973	18 June 1973	Kataeb Party
Minister of Information and Public Health	Amin Hafez	25 April 1973	18 June 1973	Independent
Minister of Labour and Social Affairs	Emile Rouhana Sakr	25 April 1973	18 June 1973	Independent
Minister of Industry and Petroleum	Zakariya Nsouli	25 April 1973	18 June 1973	Independent
Minister of Agriculture	Fahmi Chahine	25 April 1973	18 June 1973	Independent
Minister of Economy and Commerce	Bahij Tabbara	25 April 1973	18 June 1973	Independent
Minister of Electrical and Hydraulic Resources	Joseph Skaff	25 April 1973	18 June 1973	Popular Bloc
Minister of Public Works and Transportation	Najib Alameddine	25 April 1973	18 June 1973	Independent
Minister of Post, Telegraph and Telephone	Tony Frangieh	25 April 1973	18 June 1973	Marada Movement
Minister of Tourism	Ali Al Khalil	25 April 1973	18 June 1973	Independent
Minister of General Planning	Khatchig Babikian	25 April 1973	18 June 1973	Armenian Revolutionary Federation

== Motion of no confidence ==
On 12 June 1973 the Parliament met for the voting of confidence session. At least 51 members of the Parliament should vote in favor of the cabinet, but 32 members boycotted the voting session and four members did not attend it due to several reasons. Interestingly, two members of the cabinet, Bahij Tabbara and Zakariya Nsouli, did also not attend the session. Next day they submitted their resignations to the President. Takieddine Al Solh was designated to form a new cabinet on 18 July 1973.
