= First cabinet of Selim Hoss =

Lebanese cabinet between 1976 and 1979

Hoss Cabinet
- Cabinet of Lebanon
- Date formed: 9 December 1976
- Date dissolved: 2 July 1979

People and organisations
- Head of state: Elias Sarkis
- Head of government: Selim Hoss
- No. of ministers: 8

History
- Predecessor: Ninth Cabinet of Rashid Karami
- Successor: Second Cabinet of Salim Hoss

The cabinet led by Prime Minister Selim Hoss was the first government under the presidency of Elias Sarkis. It was also the first government headed by Selim Hoss. The cabinet was inaugurated on 9 December 1976 and replaced the cabinet of Rashid Karami. The term of the cabinet lasted until 2 July 1979, and it was replaced by the second cabinet of Salim Hoss.

== Background ==
Elias Hrawi was elected as the president of Lebanon and appointed Selim Hoss to form the cabinet. The cabinet was established as an interim government for six months to reestablished the order in the country. However, later its duration was extended, and the cabinet served until 2 July 1979. Thus, the cabinet served during the civil war. President Hrawi asked Hoss to establish a national unity in spring 1978 which was not materialized.

== Cabinet members ==
The cabinet included eight members, four Muslims and four Christians. They were technocrats and had no political party affiliation or ministerial experience. Most of the ministers held more than one portfolio.

The members of the cabinet are as follows:

- Prime Minister; Minister of Economy; Minister of Industry; Minister of Petroleum; Minister of Information Salim Hoss (Sunni Muslim)
- Deputy Prime Minister; Minister of Foreign Affairs; Minister of Defense Fouad Boutros (Greek Orthodox)
- Minister of Agriculture Michel Doumet (Maronite Christian)
- Minister of Finance; Minister of Justice; Minister of Posts and Telegraphs Farid Raphaël (Maronite Christian)
- Minister of Social Affairs and Labour; Minister Education Assad Rizk (Greek Catholic)
- Minister of Health; Minister of Hydraulic and Electricity Resources Ibrahim Cheito (Shia Muslim)
- Minister of Interior; Minister of Housing and Co-operatives Salah Salman (Druze)
- Minister of Public Works and Transport; Minister of Tourism Amin Bizri (Sunni Muslim)

Prime Minister Selim Hoss left the posts of minister of petroleum and minister of industry on 28 December 1978, and Assad Rizk was named as the minister of oil and industry.
