= Deputy Prime Minister of Lebanon =

Senior member of the Lebanese government

Deputy Prime Minister of Republic of Lebanon
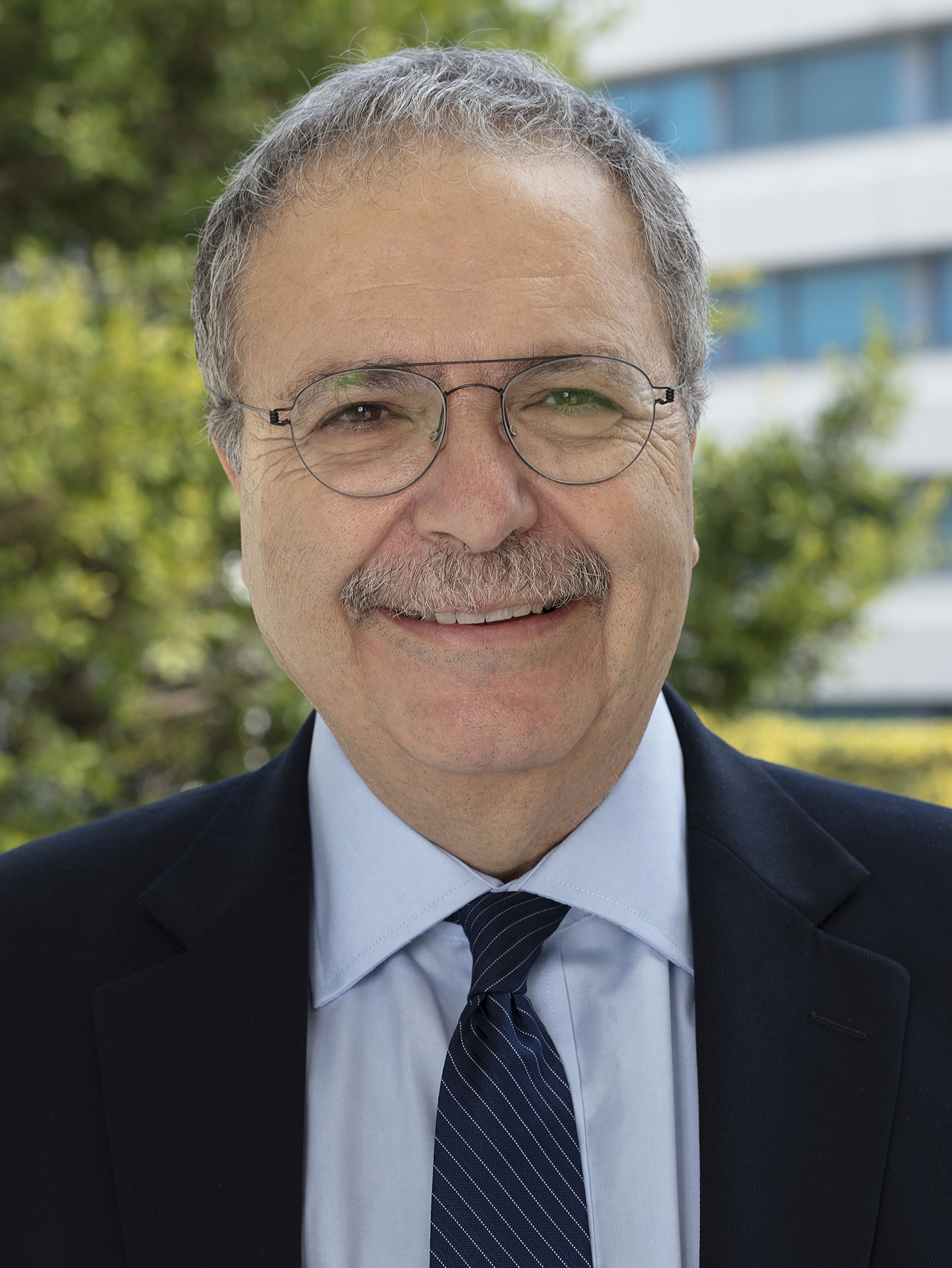
- Incumbent; Tarek Mitri since 8 February 2025
- Style: His/Her Excellency
- Member of: Council of Ministers
- Residence: Beirut
- Appointer: Prime Minister
- Inaugural holder: Habib Abu Shahla
- Formation: September 25, 1943

The office of Deputy Prime Minister of Lebanon (Arabic: نائب رئيس مجلس الوزراء اللبناني, romanized: Nāʼib Raʼīs Majlis al-Wuzarāʼ al-Lubnānī) was formed in 1943. The National Pact stipulates that the Deputy Prime Minister should always be Greek Orthodox Christian.

== List ==
No.	Portrait	Name (Birth–Death)	Term					Political party	Source
No.	Portrait	Name (Birth–Death)	Took office	Left office	Time in office	Appointed by	President	Political party	Source
1		Habib Abu Shahla	September 25, 1943	July 3, 1944	282 days	Riad Solh	Bechara El Khoury	National Bloc	
(1)		Habib Abu Shahla	July 3, 1944	January 9, 1945	1 year, 106 days	Riad Solh	Bechara El Khoury	National Bloc	
2		Nicolas Ghosn	January 9, 1945	August 22, 1945	225 days	Abdul Hamid Karami	Bechara El Khoury	Marada	
3		Gabriel El Murr	August 22, 1945	May 22, 1946	1 year, 133 days	Sami El Solh	Bechara El Khoury	Independent	
(3)		Gabriel El Murr	May 22, 1946	December 14, 1946	206 days	Sami El Solh	Bechara El Khoury	Independent	
4		Sabri Hamadeh	December 14, 1946	June 7, 1947	175 days	Riad Al Solh	Bechara El Khoury	Independent	
(3)		Gabriel El Murr	June 7, 1947	July 26, 1948	1 year, 49 days	Riad Al Solh	Bechara El Khoury	Independent	
(3)		Gabriel El Murr	July 26, 1948	1 October 1949	1 year, 67 days	Riad Al Solh	Bechara El Khoury	Independent	
5		Gibran Nahas	1 October 1949	February 14, 1951	1 year, 136 days	Riad Al Solh	Bechara El Khoury	Constitutional Bloc	
6		Philip Najib Boulos	June 7, 1951	February 11, 1952	249 days	Abdullah El Yafi	Bechara El Khoury	Independent	
7		Fouad Al-Khoury	February 11, 1952	September 9, 1952	249 days	Sami El Solh	Bechara El Khoury	Constitutional Bloc	
8		Basil Trad	September 9, 1952	September 14, 1952	5 days	Nazem Akkari	Bechara El Khoury	Independent	
(8)		Basil Trad	September 14, 1952	September 18, 1952	4 days	Saeb Salam	Bechara El Khoury	Independent	
9		Nazem Akkari	September 18, 1952	September 30, 1952	12 days	Fouad Chehab	Fouad Chehab	Military	
(3)		Gabriel El Murr	September 16, 1954	July 9, 1955	296 days	Sami El Solh	Camille Chamoun	Independent	
(3)		Gabriel El Murr	July 9, 1955	September 19, 1955	72 days	Sami El Solh	Camille Chamoun	Independent	
10		Fouad Nicolas Ghosn	September 19, 1955	March 19, 1956	182 days	Rashid Karami	Camille Chamoun	Marada	
11		Naseem Majdalani	August 1, 1960	May 20, 1961	292 days	Saeb Salam	Fouad Chehab	Progressive Socialist Party	
12		Philippe Najib Boulos	May 20, 1961	October 31, 1961	164 days	Saeb Salam	Fouad Chehab	Independent	
12		Philippe Najib Boulos	October 31, 1961	February 20, 1964	2 years, 112 days	Rashid Karami	Fouad Chehab	Independent	
(5)		Gibran Nahas	February 20, 1964	September 25, 1964	218 days	Hussein Al Oweini	Fouad Chehab	Constitutional Bloc	
(5)		Gibran Nahas	September 25, 1964	November 18, 1964	54 days	Hussein Al Oweini	Charles Helou	Constitutional Bloc	
(11)		Naseem Majdalani	November 18, 1964	July 25, 1965	249 days	Hussein Al Oweini	Charles Helou	Progressive Socialist Party	
13		Fouad Boutros	April 9, 1966	December 6, 1966	241 days	Abdullah Al Yafi	Charles Helou	Independent	
13		Fouad Boutros	February 8, 1968	October 12, 1968	247 days	Abdullah Al Yafi	Charles Helou	Independent	
(10)		Fouad Nicolas Ghosn	October 12, 1968	October 20, 1968	8 days	Abdullah Al Yafi	Charles Helou	Marada	
(11)		Naseem Majdalani	January 15, 1969	November 25, 1969	314 days	Rashid Karami	Charles Helou	Progressive Socialist Party	
(10)		Fouad Nicolas Ghosn	November 25, 1969	October 13, 1970	322 days	Rashid Karami	Charles Helou	Marada	
14		Ghassan Tueni	October 13, 1970	May 27, 1972	1 year, 227 days	Saeb Salam	Suleiman Franjieh	Independent	
15		Albert Moukheiber	May 27, 1972	April 25, 1973	333 days	Saeb Salam	Suleiman Franjieh	National Bloc	
(10)		Fouad Nicolas Ghosn	April 25, 1973	July 8, 1973	74 days	Amin Al-Hafez	Suleiman Franjieh	Marada	
(10)		Fouad Nicolas Ghosn	July 8, 1973	October 31, 1974	1 year, 115 days	Takieddin el-Solh	Suleiman Franjieh	Marada	
16		Michel Georges Sassine	October 31, 1974	May 23, 1975	204 days	Rachid Solh	Suleiman Franjieh	Independent	
17		Moussa Kanaan	May 23, 1975	July 1, 1975	39 days	Nureddine Rifai	Suleiman Franjieh	Independent	
(13)		Fouad Boutros	December 9, 1976	July 16, 1979	2 years, 219 days	Salim al-Hoss	Elias Sarkis	Independent	
(13)		Fouad Boutros	July 16, 1979	October 25, 1980	1 year, 101 days	Salim al-Hoss	Elias Sarkis	Independent	
(13)		Fouad Boutros	October 25, 1980	October 7, 1982	1 year, 347 days	Shafik Wazzan	Elias Sarkis	Independent	
18		Elie Salem	October 7, 1982	April 30, 1984	1 year, 206 days	Shafik Wazzan	Amin Gemayel	Independent	
19		Victor Kassir	April 30, 1984	September 22, 1988	4 years, 145 days	Rashid Karami	Amin Gemayel	Independent	
20		Issam Abu Jamra	September 22, 1988	October 13, 1990	2 years, 21 days	Michel Aoun	Michel Aoun	Military	
(16)		Michel Georges Sassine	October 13, 1990	December 24, 1990	72 days	Salim al-Hoss	Elias Hrawi	Independent	
21		Michel Murr	December 24, 1990	May 16, 1992	1 year, 144 days	Omar Karami	Elias Hrawi	Independent	
21		Michel Murr	May 16, 1992	October 31, 1992	168 days	Rachid Solh	Elias Hrawi	Independent	
21		Michel Murr	November 7, 1996	November 24, 1998	2 years, 17 days	Rafic Hariri	Elias Hrawi	Independent	
22		Issam Fares	October 26, 2000	17 April 2003	2 years, 173 days	Rafic Hariri	Emile Lahoud	Independent	
22		Issam Fares	17 April 2003	October 26, 2004	1 year, 192 days	Rafic Hariri	Emile Lahoud	Independent	
22		Issam Fares	October 26, 2004	April 19, 2005	175 days	Omar Karami	Emile Lahoud	Independent	
23		Elias Murr	April 19, 2005	July 19, 2005	91 days	Najib Mikati	Emile Lahoud	Independent	
23		Elias Murr	July 19, 2005	November 13, 2005	117 days	Fouad Siniora	Emile Lahoud	Independent	
(20)		Issam Abu Jamra	July 11, 2008	November 9, 2009	1 year, 121 days	Fouad Siniora	Michel Suleiman	Free Patriotic Movement	
(23)		Elias Murr	November 9, 2009	12 January 2011	1 year, 64 days	Saad Hariri	Michel Suleiman	Independent	
24		Samir Mouqbel	13 June 2011	23 March 2013	2 years, 70 days	Najib Mikati	Michel Suleiman	Independent	
24		Samir Mouqbel	15 February 2014	18 December 2016	2 years, 307 days	Tammam Salam	Michel Suleiman	Independent	
25		Ghassan Hasbani	18 December 2016	3 February 2019	2 years, 47 days	Saad Hariri	Michel Aoun	Lebanese Forces	
25		Ghassan Hasbani	3 February 2019	29 October 2019	268 days	Saad Hariri	Michel Aoun	Lebanese Forces	
26		Zeina Akar	21 January 2020	10 September 2021	1 year, 232 days	Hassan Diab	Michel Aoun	Free Patriotic Movement	
27		Saadeh Al Shami	10 September 2021	8 February 2025	3 years, 151 days	Najib Mikati	Michel Aoun	Syrian Social Nationalist Party	
28		Tarek Mitri	8 February 2025	Incumbent	1 year, 211 days	Nawaf Salam	Joseph Aoun	Independent	

== See also ==
- Government of Lebanon
