= Edmond Rizk =

Lebanese politician

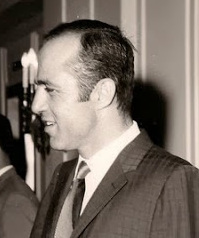
- Born: Edmond Rizk; March 11, 1934 (age 92); Jezzine
- Occupation: Politician
- Political party: Kataeb Party
- Father: Amin Rizk

Edmond Rizk is a politician, lawyer, deputy and former Lebanese minister. He was born in 1934 in Jezzine, South Lebanon.

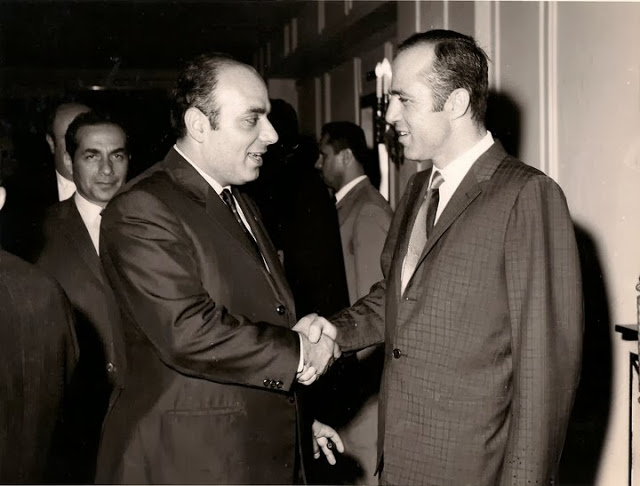
Edmond Rizk on the left

== Early life ==
His father, Amin Rizk (1890–1983), was a writer, journalist, poet and editor-in-chief of al-Hadith and Al-Rawad newspapers. He studied primary and middle school at The Lady of Mashmusha School in Jazeen, and high school at the School of Wisdom in Beirut, and then attended Saint Joseph University of Beirut, where he studied law.

== Career ==
Edmond Rizk was on the advisory committee of Notre Dame University-Lebanon, In Jezzine, South Lebanon. He is a member of the Order of Lawyers of Beirut since 1959.. He taught Arabic in the Sagesse School, the Antonine School, and the Lebanese Institute in Beit Chabeb throughout his early career (1951–1958). He has been a lawyer since 1958 and has been included in the office of minister Shafic Nassif. He was part of a team of lawyers who defended Samir Geagea after his arrest in 1994 and the family of Bashir Gemayel in his murder case. Additionally, he was elected a member of the Council of the Teachers’ Syndicate (1952–1956), and was a member of the Editors’ Syndicate (1956–1959).

== Political position ==
- Minister of National Education and Fine Arts, in April 1973, in the government of Amin al-Hafez.
- Minister of National Education and Fine Arts, in July 1973, in the government of Takieddin el-Solh.
- Minister of Justice and Information, in November 1989, in the government of Salim Al-Hoss.

== Literary works ==
- "Ranin Alfarah" (The Ring of Joy) (1958).
- "Arae wa Dimae " (Opinions and Blood) (1971).
- "Al Ithna Asharya" (the dozen), It is the first collection of his complete works, it included the following books: FI Sbil Lobnan (For Lebanon) – Shahada Fi Sabil Al Samet (Testimony in a Time of Silence) – Arae Wa Dimae (Opinions and Blood) (Second Edition) – Al Alaqa Al Soorya (The Syrian Relationship) – Mosharaka Fo Al Islam (Participation in Islam) (selections from sermons on the pulpits of mosques and Husseiniyas, and articles on Islamic occasions) – Fi Kanaf Al Masih (in the care of Christ) – Ranin Al Farah (The Ringing of Joy) (Second Edition) – Habab Al Mae (Water beads) – Nashid Al Ghorba (the anthem of exile) – Ayam Al Taraf (the days of luxury) – Fi Adkarehem (in their remembrances) – Al Milqat (the forceps), (1996)
