= Farid Raphaël =

Lebanese banker and politician (1933–2014)

Minister of Finance
- In office December 1976 – July 1979
- Prime Minister: Selim Hoss

Minister of Justice
- In office December 1976 – July 1979
- Prime Minister: Selim Hoss

Minister of Telecommunications
- In office December 1976 – July 1979
- Prime Minister: Selim Hoss

Personal details
- Born: Farid Élias Raphaël; 28 October 1933 Dlebta, Lebanon
- Died: 1 September 2014 (aged 80)
- Resting place: Dlebta, Lebanon
- Party: Independent
- Spouse: Ilham Abdel Ahad
- Children: 4
- Education: Saint Joseph University; University of Lyon
- Occupation: Banker
- Awards: Legion of Honour

Farid Raphaël (1933–2014) was a Lebanese economist and banker. He was the founder, chairman and general manager of the Banque Libano-Française (BLF).

== Early life and education ==
He was born Farid Élias Raphaël in Dlebta, Lebanon, on 28 October 1933. He hailed from a Maronite family. He was a graduate of the Saint Joseph University where he obtained a degree in Lebanese law. He also received a degree in French law from the University of Lyon.

== Career ==
Following his graduation Raphaël started his career at the French bank Compagnie Algérienne de Crédit et de Banque, later known as Compagnie Algérienne, in 1956. He was its deputy director. He established the Banque Libano-Française in 1976. He was appointed minister of finance, minister of justice and minister of telecommunications to the cabinet of Prime Minister Salim Hoss in 1976 which he held until 1979.

Then Raphaël was named as the chairman and general manager of the BLF in 1979 which he assumed until his death in 2014. He was succeeded by Walid Raphaël in the posts on 15 September 2014.

Raphaël was one of the partners of Rafic Hariri in Al Saudi Bank in the late 1980s. He served as the chairman of the Association of Banks in Lebanon between 1997 and 2001 and then, became its permanent member.

== Personal life and death ==
Raphaël married Ilham Abdel Ahad in April 1970, and they had four children: Walid, Raya, Zeina and Evelyne.

Raphaël died on 1 September 2014. His funeral ceremony was held at the Maronite Cathedral of Saint George, Beirut, on 3 September, and he was buried in Dlebta.

== Awards ==
Raphaël was the twice recipient the Legion of Honour: as a Knight in 1984 and as an Officer in 1999.
