= Anwar Sabbah =

Lebanese politician (1933–2024)

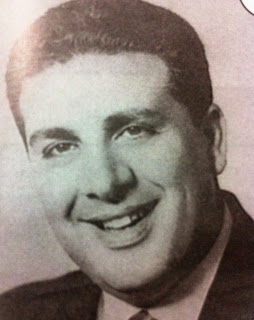

Member of the Parliament of Lebanon for Nabatieh
- In office 8 May 1964 – 9 May 1968

Member of the Parliament of Lebanon for Nabatieh
- In office 16 April 1972 – 30 April 1972

Minister of Economy and Trade
- In office 27 May 1972 – 25 April 1973
- Prime Minister: Salim Al-Huss
- Preceded by: Saeb N. Jaroudi
- Succeeded by: Bahij Tabbara

Minister of Energy and Water
- In office 16 July 1979 – 25 October 1980
- Prime Minister: Salim Al-Huss

Minister of Industry
- In office 16 July 1979 – 25 October 1980
- Prime Minister: Salim Al-Huss
- Preceded by: Mohammad Youssef Beydoun

Minister of Energy and Water
- In office 25 October 1980 – 2 September 1981
- Prime Minister: Shafik Wazzan
- Succeeded by: Mahmoud Ammar

Personal details
- Born: 10 September 1933 Nabatieh, Lebanon
- Died: 7 July 2024 (aged 90)
- Spouse: Asmaa Najib Nassar
- Children: Sadiq; Mirna; Rima; Shirin; Ali
- Education: University of Oklahoma (1956)
- Profession: Mechanical engineer

Anwar Ali Hussein Sabbah, also spelled Anwar Ali Sabah (10 September 1933 – 7 July 2024) was a Lebanese politician. He held a variety of government ministerial posts throughout the 1970s and 1980s, including Minister of Economy and Trade from 1972 to 1973, Minister of Energy and Water from 1979 to 1980, and Minister of Industry from 1979 to 1980.

== Biography ==
=== Early life ===
Sabbah was born on 10 September 1933 in Nabatieh, Lebanon. His grandfather, Hussein al-Sabbah, had served as the mayor of Nabatieh beginning in 1922. Sabbah's father immigrated to Mexico before later returning to Lebanon.

Sabbah attended primary school in Nabatieh and graduated from the American School of Art in Sidon in 1952. Following his graduation, Sabbah enrolled in the University of Oklahoma in the United States beginning in 1952 and received a bachelor's degree in mechanical engineering in 1956. He married Asmaa Najib Nassar, with whom he had five children, Sadiq, Mirna, Rima, Shirin, and Ali.

=== Career ===
He returned to Lebanon in 1956, where he worked as an engineer. Sabbah was appointed to the national Lebanese Construction Authority in 1956, where he helped with reconstruction efforts following the 1956 Chim earthquake. He then headed the maintenance department for the Trans-Arabian Pipeline (Tapline), which connected Saudi Arabia and Lebanon, until 1961.

Together with his brothers, Sabbah established the Lebanese Egyptian Film Production Company in 1962, which produced more than 500 Egyptian films.

=== Political career ===
He entered politics in 1964. That year, Sabbah, a political independent ran for the Lebanese Parliament with the support of Kamel al-Assaad, the leader of the Lebanese Social Democratic Party. Sabbah won the parliamentary seat representing his hometown of Nabatieh in the 1964 Lebanese general election.

He was further appointed chairman of the board of directors of the Southern Council in 1970. Sabbah won a seat in parliament again during the 1972 Lebanese general election and was appointed Minister of Economy and Trade from 1972 to 1973 by Prime Minister Salim Al-Huss.

He also served as the concurrent Minister of Energy and Water and Minister of Industry from July 1979 to October 1980, also in Prime Minister Salim Al-Huss's cabinet. Sabbah then held the portfolio of Minister of Energy and Water under Prime Minister Shafik Wazzan's government from 1980 to 1981. In 1981, Sabbah resigned from Wazzan's government to protest the decision not to send troops to southern Lebanon during the ongoing South Lebanon conflict. Anwar Sabbah later participated in the 1989 Taif Agreement negotiations, which contributed to the end of the Lebanese Civil War.

Sabbah also supported the establishment of the new Nabatieh Governorate and opened several schools in southern Lebanon.

=== Death ===
Sabbah died on 7 July 2024, at the age of 90. He was buried in his hometown of Nabatieh.
