= Elie Salem =

Lebanese academic and politician (born 1930)

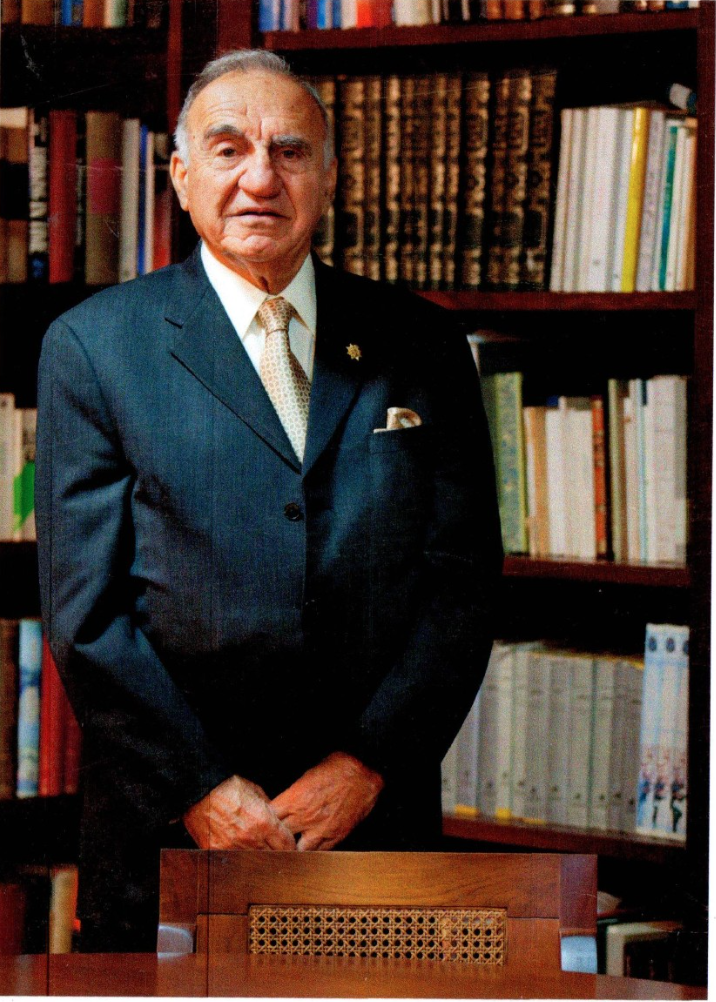
- Elie Adib Salem in his office

Deputy Prime Minister; Minister of Foreign and Expatriates Affairs
- In office 1982–1984
- President: Amine Gemayel
- Prime Minister: Shafik Wazzan
- Preceded by: Fouad Boutros
- Succeeded by: Rashid Karami

Personal details
- Born: Elie Adib Salem; 5 March 1930 (age 96) Btourram, Koura District, Lebanon
- Spouse: Phyllis Sell
- Children: 4
- Education: American University of Beirut
- Occupation: Academic, Scholar, Diplomat

Elie Adib Salem (born 1930) is a Lebanese academic, scholar and diplomat. He served as the deputy prime minister and minister of foreign affairs between 1982 and 1984 and as advisor to the president of Lebanon on foreign affairs from 1984 to 1988. He was the president of the University of Balamand from 1993 until his retirement in 2018.

== Early life and education ==
Salem was born in Btourram, El Koura (North Lebanon) on 5 March 1930. He attended the Tripoli Boys School and then earned his BA from the American University of Beirut (AUB) in 1950 in political science. He received his PhD in international affairs from Johns Hopkins University, School of Advanced International Studies (SAIS) in 1953.

== Career and activities ==
Salem worked as a professor at Johns Hopkins (SAIS) prior to returning to Lebanon to teach in the Political Science and Public Administration department at AUB in 1962. He became chairman of the department in 1970-1974, and then dean of the Faculty of Arts and Sciences from 1974 until 1982. He played a leading role in salvaging AUB from the ravages of war and was acting president on multiple occasions during the most critical periods of the Lebanese internal wars.

In 1982, he was named Deputy Prime Minister and Foreign Minister in the government of Prime Minister Chafic al-Wazzan. He led negotiations with all relevant regional and international heads of state in the wake of the 1982 Israeli Invasion in order to achieve a withdrawal of foreign forces and to rebuild Lebanese sovereignty. Between 1984 and 1988 Salem served as an advisor on foreign affairs to Lebanese President Amine Gemayel. He worked closely with the president on maintaining Lebanon’s security and stability and played a key role in the negotiations that led to the Taif Agreement that ended Lebanon’s fifteen-year internal wars.

Following the end of his term in politics, Salem founded the Lebanese Center for Policy Studies (LCPS) in 1989, which became the leading think tank in Lebanon engaged with issues of democratization and public policy. In 1993 Salem was appointed the third president of the University of Balamand (UOB). Under his leadership, UOB was transformed from a small provincial university to a full-fledged university of national and international standing. Student enrollment grew from 700 to 5500; campus building increased from 6 to 40; and the university expanded from 3 to 11 Faculties, including Engineering and Medicine.

== Personal life ==
Salem met Phyllis Sell in the US during his studies there, and they married in 1954. They have four children: Elise (Lisa), Nina, Adib, and Paul. Elise is currently a vice president at the Lebanese American University (LAU); Nina is a professor of pathology and director of cytology at the American University of Beirut (AUB) Medical Center; Adib is an economist and financial consultant; and Paul is a vice-president of the Middle East Institute.

Salem has eleven grandchildren in Lebanon and the US. He currently resides in Btourram, El Koura, where he is translating into Arabic his latest book on his vision for Lebanon.

=== Works ===
Salem has published over ten books in English and Arabic related to the University of Balamand, including AXIOS: The Rise of a University, From Vision to Action (UOB Press, 2018). His scholarly books include, Violence and Diplomacy in Lebanon, 1982-1988. Translated into Arabic as al-Khayarat al-Saabah. This is a detailed and critical interpretation of Lebanon’s efforts to regain its independence and sovereignty (I.B. Tauris Press, London, 1995); and Modernization Without Revolution on Lebanon’s experience as a state between 1943 and 1970, prior to its internal war of 1975-1990 (Indiana University Press, Bloomington and London, 1972). He also translated and authored the introduction of Rusūm dār al-khilāfah (The rules and regulations of the ‘Abbāsid court). Amongst his personal books is My American Bride about his life and marriage and the often humorous clashes between his Lebanese background and 20th century American culture (Quartet Books, London, 2008). He recently published In Dialogue with Lebanon: A Personal-Political Narrative (Saer Al Mashrek, Beirut, 2023).

=== Awards ===
- Order of King Faisal of Saudi Arabia (1983)
- Honorary Doctorate of Law from Marietta College (1984)
- Order of the Cedars of Lebanon (1988)
- Grand Cordon of Order of St. Peter and St. Paul (2010)
