= Assad Rizk =

Lebanese physician and politician (1931–2020)

Minister of Industry and Petroleum
- In office 1992–1995
- Prime Minister: Rafic Hariri

Minister of Oil and Industry
- In office 20 December 1978 – 16 July 1979
- Prime Minister: Selim Hoss

Minister of Education
- In office 9 December 1976 – 16 July 1979
- Prime Minister: Selim Hoss

Minister of Social Affairs and Labour
- In office 9 December 1976 – 16 July 1979
- Prime Minister: Selim Hoss

Personal details
- Born: Assad Toufic Rizk; 23 July 1931 Beirut, Lebanon
- Died: 11 December 2020 (aged 89)
- Spouse: Colette Le Breton
- Children: 3
- Education: Saint Joseph University
- Occupation: Physician
- Awards: Legion of Honour; Order of Merit of the Italian Republic

Assad Rizk (1931–2020) was a Lebanese physician and politician. He taught at the Saint Joseph University for thirty years and also, held various cabinet portfolios. He was the founder of the Lebanese American University Medical Center-Rizk Hospital.

== Early life and education ==
Rizk was born in Beirut on 23 July 1931. He hailed from a Greek Catholic family. His father, Toufic, was a surgeon.

Rizk obtained a degree in medicine from the Saint Joseph University in the late 1950s and completed his medical training at a urology clinic in Paris.

== Career ==
Following his return to Lebanon Rizk taught courses on urology at the Saint Joseph University from the mid-1960s. He retired from his teaching post in the mid-1990s. Then he was named as an emeritus professor. He established the Rizk Hospital which was later named as Lebanese American University Medical Center-Rizk Hospital.

=== Cabinet posts ===
Rizk was named as minister of social affairs and labour and minister education on 9 December 1976 to the cabinet led by Salim Hoss. Rizk was also appointed minister of oil and industry on 20 December 1978 in a cabinet reshuffle. He succeeded Selim Hoss in the post who had been serving as minister of petroleum and minister of industry since 9 December 1976. Rizk's term in all offices ended on 16 July 1979 when a new cabinet was formed by Selim Hoss.

Rizk was named as the minister of industry and petroleum in 1992 and served in the cabinet led by Rafic Hariri until 1995. Rizk served as the minister of justice in 2005. The same year he also acted as an interim minister of culture and interim minister of education and higher education.

== Personal life and death ==
Rizk married Colette Le Breton in 1959. They had three sons: Toufic, Fady and Sami.

Rizk died on 11 December 2020.

== Awards ==
Rizk was awarded the Knight rank of the Legion of Honour. He was also recipient of the Order of Merit of the Italian Republic.
