= Bahij Tabbara =

Lebanese politician (1929–2026)

- بهيج طبارة

Minister of Justice
- In office 2003–2004
- Prime Minister: Rafik Hariri

Minister of State for Administrative Reform
- In office 2001–2003
- Prime Minister: Rafik Hariri

Minister of Justice
- In office 31 October 1992 – December 1998
- Prime Minister: Rafik Hariri

Minister of Economy and Commerce
- In office April 1973 – June 1973
- Prime Minister: Amin Al Hafez
- Preceded by: Anwar Sabbah

Personal details
- Born: 10 July 1929 Beirut, Lebanon
- Died: June 2026 (aged 96) Beirut, Lebanon
- Party: Future Movement
- Spouse: Hoda Kyriakos Saad
- Children: 3
- Education: Saint Joseph University; University of Grenoble

Bahij Tabbara (Arabic: بهيج طبارة; 10 July 1929 – June 2026) was a Lebanese jurist and politician who held various cabinet posts and was a member of the parliament of Lebanon. He was among the close allies of Rafik Hariri.

== Early life and education ==
Tabbara was born in Beirut on 10 July 1929. He received a degree in law from Saint Joseph University in Beirut and a PhD in law from the University of Grenoble in France.

== Career ==
Following his graduation Tabbara began to work as a lawyer from 1954. He was also the private lawyer and legal adviser of future Prime Minister Rafik Hariri. He taught at Lebanese University and Saint Joseph University in Beirut.

Between April and June 1973, Tabbara was the minister of economy and commerce in the cabinet led by the prime minister, Amin Al Hafez. The appointment of Tabbara and another Sunni Zakariya Nsouli caused controversy in the general public and they were forced to resign. They both resigned from the office together with Al Hafez. Tabbara was involved in drafting the election law of Lebanon in the 1990s. On 31 October 1992, he was named as the minister of justice in the first cabinet of Rafik Hariri. Tabbara held the post in the subsequent cabinets of Hariri until December 1998. He was the minister of state for administrative reform between 2001 and 2003. He was again appointed minister of justice in 2003 and held the post for one year.

In 2005, Tabbara was elected to parliament from the Future Movement. The same year, after the assassination of Rafic Hariri, he was cited as one of the potential candidates for the premiership. In May 2019, he was also proposed as the prime minister following the resignation of the Lebanese government led by Saad Hariri, but he declined the offer.

In addition to his academic and political activities Tabbara was one of the shareholders of the companies, mostly real estate companies, owned by Rafik Hariri.

== Personal life and work ==
Tabbara married Hoda Kyriakos Saad, a lawyer. He has three children from a previous marriage. He is the author of several books and articles on legal topics.

Tabbara's death at the age of 96 was announced on 26 June 2026.
