= Elias Hrawi =

President of Lebanon from 1989 to 1998

His Excellency Elias Hrawi OM ONC
- إلياس الهراوي
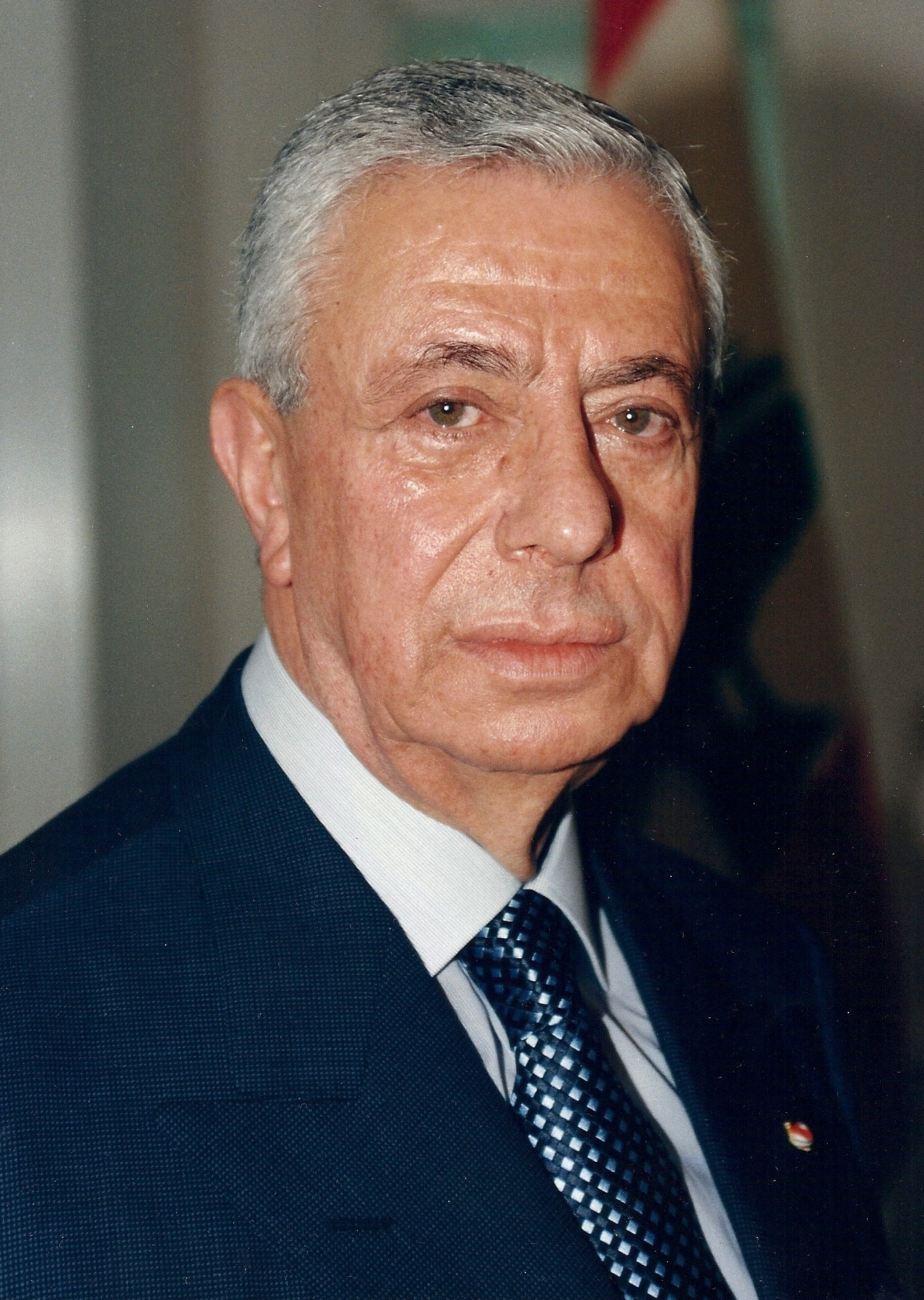
- Official portrait, 1989

10th President of Lebanon
- In office 24 November 1989 – 23 November 1998
- Prime Minister: Selim Hoss; Omar Karami; Rafic Hariri
- Preceded by: Selim Hoss (acting)
- Succeeded by: Émile Lahoud

Personal details
- Born: 4 September 1926 Zahlé, Greater Lebanon
- Died: 7 July 2006 (aged 79) Beirut, Lebanon
- Party: Independent
- Spouse(s): Evelyn Chidiac (m. 1947) Mona Jammal (m. 1961)
- Children: 5
- Education: Saint Joseph University
- Profession: Businessman, lawyer, politician
- *Hrawi's term was disputed by Michel Aoun until 13 October 1990.

Elias Hrawi (Arabic: إلياس الهراوي; 4 September 1926 – 7 July 2006) was a Lebanese politician who served as the 10th president of Lebanon from 1989 to 1998.

== Early life and education ==
Hrawi was born on 4 September 1926 in Hawch Al Umara, Zahlé, to a wealthy landowning Maronite family in the Bekaa Valley. He was the son of Khalil Hrawi and Helena Harb. He obtained a diploma in commerce at the Sagesse Institute in 1947. He enrolled at St Joseph University, Faculty of Law but did not complete his studies there.

== Business activities ==
Hrawi dealt with agriculture until he became a member of Lebanon Parliament in 1972. A successful businessman, Hrawi started a vegetable-export business, dealing with major Swiss companies. He also headed the Beqaa sugarbeet cooperative. When his export business was destroyed by the 1975–1990 civil war, he switched his business to oil import.

== Career ==
The scion of a politically prominent family, Hrawi followed his brothers Georges and Joseph when he was elected to the National Assembly in 1972. From 1980 to 1982, he served in the cabinet as minister of public works under President Elias Sarkis and Prime Minister Shafik Wazzan. He concentrated on building bridges and highways to link all parts of the country.

Hrawi was a member of the independent Maronite Catholic bloc in the Parliament. The bloc included nine Maronite Catholic legislators who aimed at clearing the Christian militias and maintaining positive relationships with both the Muslims and Syria.

=== President of Lebanon ===
Hrawi was elected at the Park Hotel in Chtoura by 47 out of 53 members of parliament on 24 November 1989 two days after the murder of Lebanon's President René Mouawad. Five MPs cast blank ballots in the election. As President, Hrawi signed into law amendments to the Constitution that formalized the Taif Agreement reforms, giving a greater measure of power and influence to Lebanon's Muslim community than before.

Since Baabda Palace, the president's residence, was destroyed and bombed by Syrian troops in October 1990 to drive out General Michel Aoun, Hrawi lived in future prime minister Rafik Hariri's Beirut apartment. On 13 October 1990, with support from the Syrian army, he forced General Aoun, who was heading a rival administration, to surrender to begin the reconstruction of Lebanon. On 22 May 1991, he signed the treaty of fraternity, co-ordination and co-operation with Syria, in which Lebanon promised not to allow its territory to be used against Syria's interests. In 1992, Hrawi appointed Rafik Hariri as prime minister. Hrawi attended the meetings of the cabinet during his term to control the executive branch of the country.

Lebanese people had distinct opinions about Hrawi's term. Some appreciate his decisiveness in acting against the feuding militias, ending the civil war that had been tearing the country apart for fifteen years and reuniting the major political parties of Lebanon. His supporters viewed him as a pragmatic political figure, and respected him for his long-held conviction that national loyalty should take precedence over sectarian interests, and for promoting peaceful coexistence among Lebanon's religious factions. Conversely, Hrawi's attempt to pass a law legitimizing civil marriage failed due to the fierce opposition from religious authorities. Some have accused him of inconsistency for disarming all Christian and most Muslim militias – but not Hezbollah, a Shi'a political party. His critics also point out that he was very supportive of Syrian interests and charge that the cooperation treaty that he signed turned Lebanon into a Syrian colony. He has also been criticized by some for having the Constitution amended to extend his term of office by three years on 13 October 1995. It is argued that it occurred after Hrawi went to Damascus and agreed on a plan by which he would be succeeded later by Emile Lahoud. Former President Amine Gemayel said at the time that such actions (which he charged were taken "almost casually") undermined the delicate constitutional principles of the nation. His presidency ended on 23 November 1998.

After his term ended, Hrawi expressed his regrets about the extension of his term through the amendment of the Lebanese Constitution to Chibli Mallat.

== Personal life ==
Hrawi married twice. He married Evelyn Chidiac in 1947 and became a father to three children: Rina, George and Roy. He married his second wife, Mona Jammal, in 1961, and had two children, Zalfa and Roland.

His son-in-law, Fares Boueiz, was minister of foreign affairs from 1990 to 1998. His elder sons have a firm dealing with the import of petroleum. His eldest son ran for general elections in 1992 but lost in the seat in Zahle.

=== Death ===
Hrawi died of cancer at the American University of Beirut Medical Center in Beirut on 7 July 2006, aged 79.

Political offices
Preceded by Selim Hoss; Acting	President of Lebanon; 1989–1998	Succeeded by Émile Lahoud
