= Amin al-Hafez =

Amin al-Hafez may refer to:

- Amin al-Hafez (Lebanon) (1926–2009), prime minister of Lebanon
- Amin al-Hafiz (1921–2009), Syrian politician, military officer and member of the Ba'ath Party
