= Moukheiber =

Moukheiber, Moukhaiber, Mukheibir, Mukheiber or Mokhiber (Arabic: مُخَيْبِر, romanized: Mukhaybir, Levantine Arabic: Mukhēbir) is an Arabic surname, particularly from Lebanon, meaning 'clever' or 'skilled'. Notable people with the surname include:

- Albert Moukheiber (1912–2002), Lebanese doctor and politician
- Craig Mokhiber (born 1960), American human rights expert and former UN official
- Lauren Mukheibir (born 2001), South African rock climber

== See also ==
- Mokhber
- Mukhbiir
