= Majid Khadduri =

Iraqi academic (1909–2007)

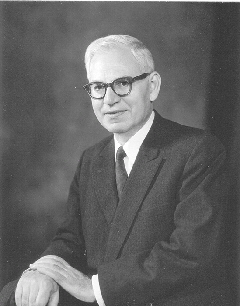
- Born: September 27, 1909; Mosul, Ottoman Empire
- Died: January 25, 2007 (aged 97); Potomac, Maryland, United States
- Occupation: Professor of Middle Eastern Studies

Majid Khadduri (Arabic: مجيد خدوري; September 27, 1909 – January 25, 2007) was an Iraqi academic. He was founder of the Paul H. Nitze School of Advanced International Studies Middle East Studies program, a division of Johns Hopkins University based in Washington, D.C. Internationally, he was recognized as a leading authority on a wide variety of Islamic subjects, modern history and the politics of the Middle East. He was the author of more than 35 books in English and Arabic and hundreds of articles.

== Personal life ==
Khadduri was born in Mosul, Iraq in 1909 where he lived until 1928, when he graduated high school. Afterwards he headed to Lebanon and the American University of Beirut, where he received his B.A. in 1932. He followed this up with a Ph. D in International Law and Political Science in 1938 from the University of Chicago. From 1939 to 1947 he worked for the Iraqi Ministry of Education and as a law professor at the Higher Teachers College. In 1946 he was a member of the first Iraqi delegation to the United Nations and helped draft the organization's charter.

He had two brothers, Khalid, and Dulel, and two sisters Mathela and Khairiya. He married Madjia Dawaff, who died in 1972, and had two children: Farid and Shirin, who in turn gave him three grandchildren. He died on January 25, 2007, at a care facility in Potomac, Maryland.

== Academic life ==
After his experiences at the United Nations, Khadduri returned to the United States, where he was a professor at Indiana University and his alma mater, the University of Chicago. He then taught at Johns Hopkins University, where he founded the SAIS Middle Eastern Studies program and served until 1970. From 1960 to 1980, he served as director of Center for Middle East Studies. It was there that he offered some of the first courses on Islamic law in the nation. His graduates included:

- Elie Salem, former foreign minister of Lebanon
- Soliman Solaim, former Saudi Arabian commerce minister
- Samuel W. Lewis, United States ambassador to Egypt
- Hermann Eilts, United States ambassador to Egypt
- Malcolm H. Kerr, assassinated president of the American University of Beirut

Throughout his tenure, he was also a visiting professor at institutions such as Columbia University, Harvard University, the University of Virginia and Georgetown University. He also founded the Shaybani Society of International Law, the International Association of Middle East Studies and the University of Libya in Benghazi where he served as dean in 1957.

=== Honors and awards ===
- Philosophical Society grant
- Fellowship from the Ford Foundation
- Fulbright Program grant
- Rockefeller Foundation grant (three times)
- Honorary LHDs from Johns Hopkins and the State University of New York
- Order of Merit (Egypt), first class
- Order of the Two Rivers
- Honorary fellow of the Middle East Studies Association
- Member of the Academy of Arabic Language
- Member of the Iraqi Academy

== Published works ==
- Modern Libya: A Study in Political Development (June 1963)
- Political Trends in the Arab World: The Role of Ideas and Ideals in Politics (January 1970)
- Arab Contemporaries: The Role of Personalities in Politics (June 1973)
- War and Peace in the Law of Islam (June 1977)
- Socialist Iraq: A Study in Iraqi Politics since 1968 (January 1978)
- Independent Iraq, Nineteen Thirty-Two to Nineteen Fifty-Eight: A Study in Iraqi Politics (June 1980)
- Arab Personalities in Politics (April 1981)
- Law in the Middle East: Origin and Development of Islamic Law (editor Herbert J. Liebesny) (October 1982)
- Political Trends in the Arab World: The Role of Ideas and Ideals (June 1983)
- The Arab Gulf States: Steps Toward Political Participation (with John Peterson) (February 1988)
- The Gulf War: The Origins and Implications of the Iraq-Iran Conflict (May 1988)
- War in the Gulf, 1990-91: The Iraq-Kuwait Conflict and Its Implications (with Edmund Ghareeb) (August 2001)
- The Islamic Conception of Justice (February 2002)

=== Works as Editor ===
- The Islamic Law of Nations: Shaybani's Siyar (February 2002)
- Al-Shafi'i's Risala: Treatise on the Foundations of Islamic Jurisprudence
