= Fouad Naffah =

Lebanese politician (1925–2017)

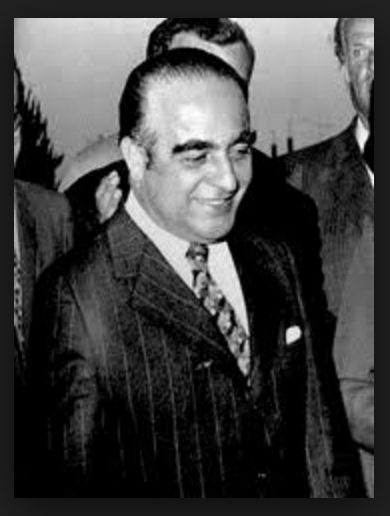

Minister of Foreign Affairs and Emigrants
- In office 1973–1974
- President: Suleiman Frangieh
- Succeeded by: Philippe Takla

Minister of Finance
- In office 27 May 1972 – 8 July 1973
- Prime Minister: Takieddin el-Solh
- Preceded by: Elias Saba
- Succeeded by: Takieddin el-Solh
- President: Suleiman Frangieh

Personal details
- Born: 1 March 1925 Zouk Mikael
- Died: 9 April 2017 (aged 92) Adma
- Spouse: Zbeide Sfeir (1954–2017)
- Children: 4
- Education: Universite Saint-Joseph

Fouad Georges Naffah (Arabic: فؤاد نفاع; M 1 March 1925 – 9 April 2017) was a Lebanese politician and former Minister of Foreign Affairs, Minister of Finance and deputy for Keserwan (1960–1964, and 1972–1992). He held cabinet posts of Minister of Agriculture (March – May 1972), Finance (1972–1973) and Foreign Affairs (1973–1974). He was also a potential presidential candidate at the end of the 1980s.

== Early life and education ==
Born in Zouk Mikael, Keserwan on 1 March 1925, Naffah graduated from Université Saint-Joseph with a bachelor's degree in law in 1946.

== Political career ==
He became involved in politics in 1951 and was elected as a member of parliament for Keserwan in 1960, and then re-elected in 1972. He was appointed Minister for Agriculture under the government of Prime Minister Saeb Salam and then served as Minister of Finance under Prime Minister Amin al-Hafez from 1972 to 1973, later as Minister of Foreign Affairs under Prime Minister Takieddin el-Solh.

== Career as Foreign Minister ==
The former Lebanese ambassador to the United States and United Kingdom, Nadim Dimechkie, recalls in his mémoires the role played by Naffah at the Islamic Conference in Karachi in 1972. Dimechkie writes: "the majority of Lebanese feel perfectly at ease in their exchanges with all human beings, without consideration of colour, race or religion. I remember an event which took place at the start of the 1970s. At the Islamic conference in Karachi, the Bangladeshi delegation were absent because of a strong tension which opposed Dhaka in Karachi. The conference decided to send a delegation presided by the Lebanese Minister of Foreign Affairs instead, a Maronite Christian, Mr. Fouad Naffah in order to play the mediator between the two disputing parties. It goes without saying that our minister saw full success in his mediation. This is not the only example of international mediation led by Lebanon, but as far as I can remember, this was the most spectacular and the most original".

In July 1973, Naffah led a delegation to meet Syrian Foreign Minister Abdul-Halim Khaddam and Syrian Army Intelligence Chief Colonel Hikmat al-Shihabi.

In January 1974, Naffah participated in a special Arab League mission to South America, seeking to clarify the position of different nations on the Arab-Israeli conflict, including that of Brazil. This trip was seen as instrumental in leading to the Argentine, Brazilian and Mexican governments to uphold Palestinian rights.

In February 1974, Naffah participated in a mission led by Kuwait's Foreign Minister Sheikh Sabah al-Ahmad al-Jaher and several other foreign ministers and ambassadors from the Islamic world to Dacca to seek a last-minute reconciliation between Bangladesh and Pakistan.

On 11 April 1974, the Kiryat Shmona massacre occurred in which eighteen people were killed in Israel by three members of the Popular Front for the Liberation of Palestine. Israel responded with air strikes against villages in Southern Lebanon suspected of harbouring Palestinian commandos. The United Nations Security Council then adopted a resolution on 24 April that condemned Israel for its violation of Lebanese territory, but did not mention the attack at Kiryat Shmona. According to many Western diplomats, a draft text sponsored by Western powers had mentioned Kiryat Shmona but after the draft was discussed in Washington by Naffah and Henry Kissinger, US Secretary of State, it was returned with the reference deleted. According to Robert D. Kumamoto, Naffah was pressing the United States to find a way to affirm his country's territorial integrity, and that Kissinger needed the support of other Arab states to help induce Syrian flexibility. The moderate Arab countries had made it clear that an American veto would severely impair their ability to urge restraint.

In June 1974, he visited the Philippines and met with President Ferdinand E. Marcos. He was then awarded the Sultan Kudarat decoration for his efforts at promoting understanding between the Philippines and the Islamic Conference.

== Political beliefs ==
A strong believer in the Chehabist approach, he was a supporter of the Palestinian cause and believed the solution to the Palestinian question was integral to the solution of Lebanon's own political strife.

He participated in the 1989 Taef agreement. and around this time was considered for the role of president as part of the solution to end Lebanon's civil war.

He boycotted the 1992 elections and was subsequently elected Secretary-General of the Lebanese National Rally founded by President Amine Gemayel.

== Death and posthumous award ==
Naffah died at the age of 92 on 9 April 2017. He was posthumously awarded the National Order of the Cedar, Lebanon's highest honour for great services rendered to the country, for acts of courage, devotion of great moral value and for years in public service. In an obituary by Samir Atallah, Naffah was commended as "a model politician" and for never using power to serve his own interests. Atallah described him as a "sincere and noble politician" and that with his loss, Lebanon "loses a role model in honest political work".
