= Nazem Akkari =

Lebanese politician (1902–1985)

- ناظم عكاري
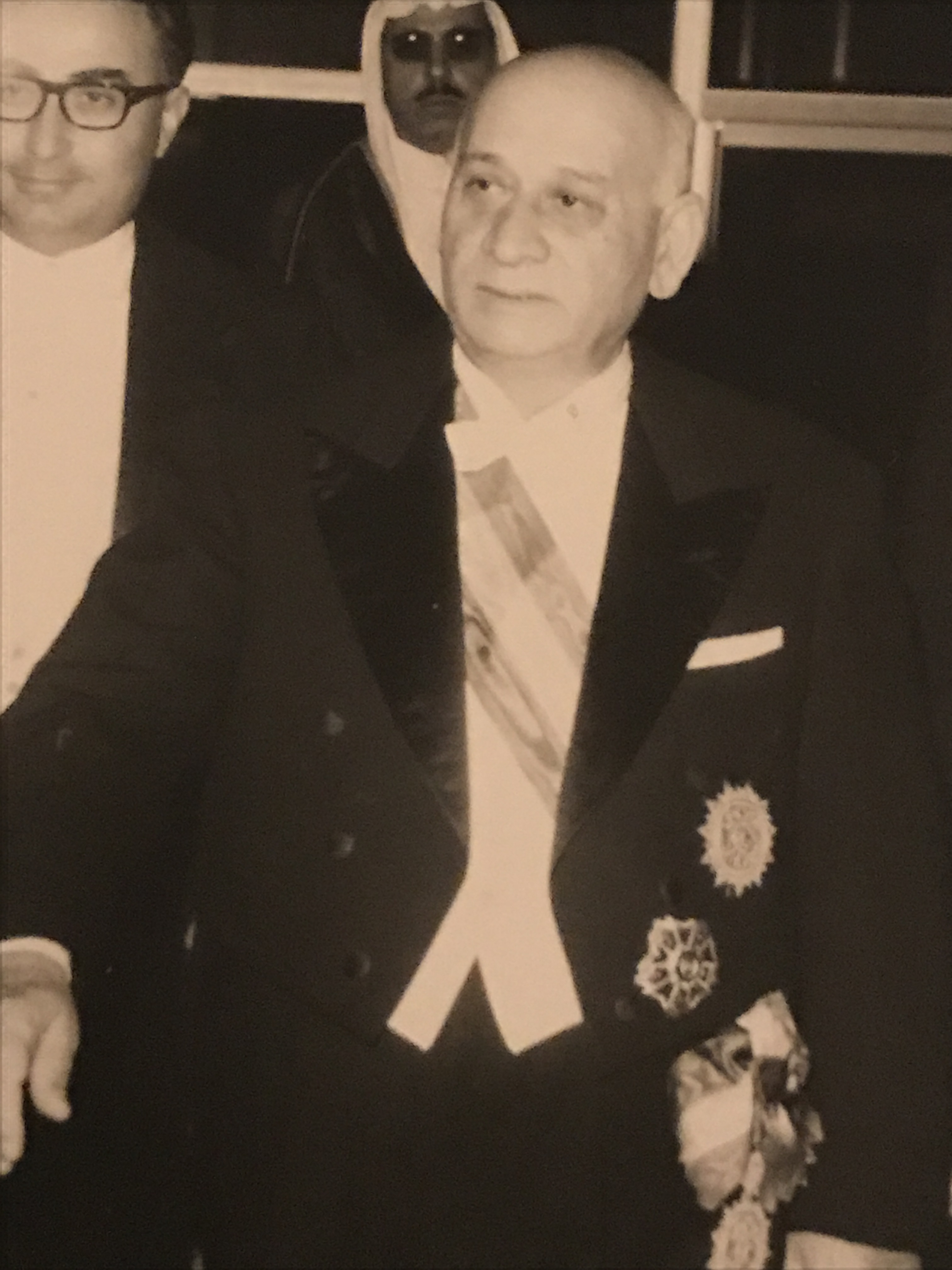

Prime Minister of Lebanon
- In office 9 September 1952 – 14 September 1952
- President: Bechara El Khoury
- Deputy: Basil Trad
- Preceded by: Sami Solh
- Succeeded by: Saeb Salam

Deputy Prime Minister of Lebanon
- In office 18 September 1952 – 30 September 1952
- President: Fouad Chehab (acting); Camille Chamoun
- Prime Minister: Fouad Chehab (acting)
- Preceded by: Basil Trad
- Succeeded by: Gabriel El Murr

Personal details
- Born: 1902 Tripoli, Lebanon
- Died: 11 March 1985 (aged 82–83)
- Party: Independent
- Occupation: Politician

Nazem Akkari (Arabic: ناظم عكاري; 1902 in Tripoli, Ottoman Empire – 11 March 1985) was a Lebanese politician who served as the 7th prime minister of Lebanon and then the 9th deputy prime minister of Lebanon in 1952 during the most turbulent time of transfer of power from President Bechara El Khoury to President Camille Chamoun.

== Prime Minister ==
During the last month of the rule of incumbent President Bechara El Khoury, the Lebanese president of the Republic was faced with fierce opposition that objected to his plans for renewal for a second term. The opposition was led by a big coalition of Christian and Muslim forces under the banner of the "National Socialist Front".

El Khoury assigned Nazem Akkari to form an emergency caretaker government until the Presidential elections. The result was a three-member cabinet that included:

- Nazem Akkari - Prime Minister of Lebanon—also carrying the portfolios of Foreign Affairs, Internal Affairs, Defense, Agriculture and Information
- Basil Trad - Deputy Prime Minister of Lebanon—also carrying portfolios of Economy, Public Works, Education, Health
- Moussa Moubarak - portfolios for Justice, Finance, Social Affairs, Post Telephone and Telegraph (PTT)

The Akkari government was declared on 9 September 1952.

On 9 October 1958, in an internal memo from the US Embassy in Lebanon to the US Department of State, US Diplomat McClintock relates his discussions about the political crisis with General Fouad Chehab. He mentions that Chehab had in mind a “neutral” cabinet made up largely of military officers with a leavening of experienced civilians. He said, for example, that Prime Minister would be either Nazem Akkari Sunni Muslim Chef de Cabinet at Prime Minister’s office, an old wheelhorse in the Civil Service who once held Prime Ministership in 1952, or Ahmed Daouk, longtime Ambassador in Paris, also a Sunni Muslim.

== Deputy Prime Minister ==
Akkari's premiership led way to a new military-led government under the supervision of the temporary holding of power by General Chehab. In this new takeover government, Nazem Akkari was assigned as Deputy Prime Minister of Lebanon and given the portfolios of Foreign Affairs, Interior Affair, Public Works, Information, Education, Post Telephone and Telegraph (PTT) and Agriculture until installation of the new president Camille Chamoun.

Things only settled with the assignment of Khaled Chehab as Prime Minister on 1 October 1952. This government survived for seven months during the reign of President Camille Chamoun and lasted until 1 May 1953.

Political offices
Preceded by Sami Solh	Prime Minister of Lebanon; 1952	Succeeded by Saeb Salam
Preceded by Basil Trad	Deputy Prime Minister of Lebanon; 1952	Succeeded by Gabriel El Murr
