= Deputy Speaker of the Parliament of Lebanon =

Deputy Speaker of the Parliament of the Lebanese Republic
- Coat of arms of Lebanon

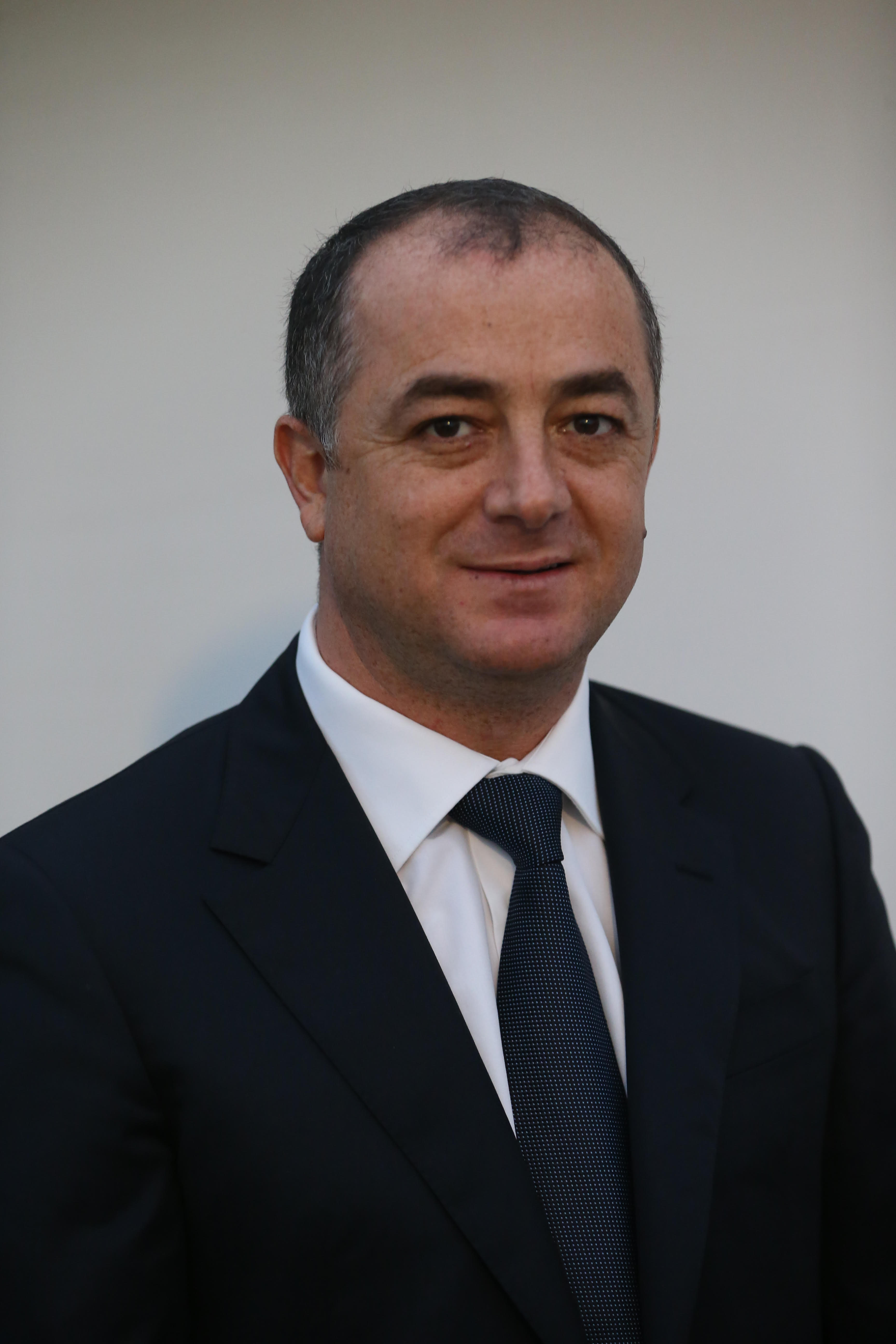
- Incumbent; Elias Bou Saab since May 31, 2022
- Website: Parliament of Republic of Lebanon

The Deputy Speaker of the Parliament of Lebanon is the second highest-ranking official of the Lebanese Parliament.

== National Pact ==
Though the constitution does not require it, an unwritten understanding between the Maronite, Sunni, Shia, Greek Orthodox and Druze leaderships in Lebanon in 1943, known as the National Pact, has resulted in the holder of the post being a Greek Orthodox Christian in every electoral cycle since that time.

== Former Deputy Speakers ==
- Michel Georges Sassine
- Adib Ferzli
- Mounir Abou Fadel
- Farid Makari
- Albert Moukheiber
- Elie Ferzli

== See also ==
- List of presidents of Lebanon
- List of prime ministers of Lebanon
- List of speakers of the Parliament of Lebanon
