= Khatchig Babikian =

Lebanese politician

Khatchig Babikian (1924–1999) aka John Babikian, was a philanthropist, attorney, a Lebanese politician of Armenian origin, and a former member of the Lebanese Parliament (1957–1999) and Lebanese government minister on many occasions as minister of Health, Tourism, Information, Planning, Foreign Affairs, and Justice.

Babikian was renowned for his multilingual proficiency, philanthropic efforts, and support for the Armenian community. The Khatchig Babikian Fund, a charitable initiative founded by his family in his honor, aims to support Armenians, particularly in Lebanon.

== Biography ==
Born in Larnaca, on the island of Cyprus, Babikian studied in France, Lebanon, and Italy. A polyglot, he spoke Arabic, Italian, French, Armenian, Turkish, English, and Latin. He was imprisoned in 1940 in a concentration camp in Italy, where he finished his baccalaureate. He later obtained his law degree from the Saint Joseph University of Beirut.

Babikian was elected and appointed Armenian orthodox of Beirut in 1957 and remained a member of the Parliament until the date of his death in 1999. He was replaced by André Tabourian. He was a minister of State to the administrative Reform (1960–1961), of Health (1969), of Tourism, of Information (1972–1973, government Saëb Salam), of the Plan and the Foreign Affairs (1973, government Hafez Amine) and of Justice (1980–1982, government Chafic Wazzan and 1990–1992). Babikian was also the former chairman of the executive council of the Armenian Catholicosate of Cilicia — Antelias, Lebanon.

In 1969, during Babikian's first year as Minister of Health, he attained and distributed 1.5 million doses of the polio vaccine throughout Lebanon for all children aged under 5. Polio cases dropped from 600 nationwide in 1969 to 22 in 1970.

For his notable contribution to the French language, Babikian was awarded the Legion of Honour (officer rank) in 1986 along with one of the highest ranks of L'ordre de la Pléiade in 1998 which recognises the work and contributions to the development of the French language globally.

In 1972, Babikian pioneered social housing in Lebanon creating the country's first state funded housing in the Beirut suburb of Fanar. The project called Leylavan focused on providing housing to displaced Armenian families and was composed of 272 housing units, a school, a social and sport club, a medical dispensary and several work places.

=== Khatchig Babikian Fund ===
The Khatchig Babikian Fund was created in January 2007 by his five daughters. The fund honors the memory of Babikian.

The fund is to contribute to the welfare of Lebanese Armenians in particular, and Armenians in general. It was the will of Babikian to establish such a charitable fund to benefit Armenians in humanitarian, educational and cultural projects. In addition to the donation to St. Stephen’s, the Babikian Fund has made large donations to Beirut’s St. Joseph University and the American University of Beirut, providing scholarships for needy students.
