= The National Evangelical School in Nabatieh =

National Evangelical School in Nabatieh
- Injilieh Nabatieh

Location
- Mayddan Street, Nabatie; Beirut; Lebanon

Information
- Type: Private school
- Established: 1925
- Principal: Mr. Shadi El Hajjar
- Grades: 1 - 15
- Yearbook: "Almesbahh"
- Languages: English, French, Arabic
- Website: http://www.nesn.edu.lb

Nabatieh Evangelical School is a Protestant American missionary school in the south of Lebanon, which was founded in 1925. It is one of the oldest high schools in the country and one of the first pre-higher education institutions in the Middle East. It is part of the National Evangelical Synod of Syria and Lebanon. It is located in Nabatieh. School Principal of the Nabatieh Evangelical School is Mr. Shadi Hajar. The school has four departments: Preschool, Elementary, Intermediate, and Secondary. Nabatieh Evangelical School is a part of Evangelical schools in Lebanon, such as Sidon Evangelical School, Zahlé Evangelical School, and The Lebanese Evangelical School in Ain Zhalta and others.

== Early years ==
The National Evangelical School in Nabatieh started its academic mission in 1925 under the supervision of the American Commissionary by the name of "American School for Girls in Nabatieh."It was composed of one rented room that included a few numbers of students who were learning the reading, writing, calculating, in addition to English language and arts. The school's supervisor, Lewis Loe, had stayed till 1935, when the school moved to a new rented building.
