= Khalil Abou Hamad =

Lebanese lawyer and politician (1936–1992)

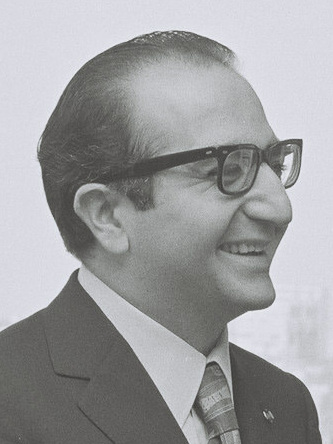
- Abou Hamad in 1972

Minister of Foreign Affairs and Emigrants
- In office 13 October 1970 – 25 April 1973
- President: Suleiman Frangieh
- Prime Minister: Saeb Salam
- Preceded by: Nasim Majdalani
- Succeeded by: Khatchig Babikian

Personal details
- Born: 1936
- Died: 1992 (aged 55–56)

Khalil Abou Hamad (1936–1992) was a Lebanese lawyer who served as the minister of foreign affairs in the period 1970–1973.

== Early life ==
Abou Hamad was born in 1936. He hailed from a Greek Catholic family.

== Career ==
Abou Hamad was a lawyer by profession and founded a law firm in Beirut. He was named as the minister of foreign affairs on 13 October 1970 in the cabinet led by Prime Minister Saeb Salam, replacing Nassim Majdalani in the post. Abou Hamad remained in office until 25 April 1973 when a new cabinet formed, and Khatchig Babikian was appointed foreign minister.

== Activities and views ==
When Abou Hamad was serving as foreign minister in December 1970, he announced the neutrality of Lebanon stating that Lebanon would not align with either side in the Cold War. He visited China following the opening of National Bank of China in Beirut in 1972.

Following the murder of the Israeli Olympic athletes by the Palestinian Black September militants in Munich in September 1972, Abou Hamad argued that Lebanon would limit the movements of the Palestinians living in the country.

== Later years and death ==
Abou Hamad was one of the board of trustees members of the Diana Tamari Sabbagh Foundation which was established by Palestinian businessman Hasib Sabbagh in 1979 following the death of his wife Diana Tamari. Abou Hamad died in 1992.
