= Nabatieh =

City in Nabatieh Governorate, Lebanon

Nabatieh النبطية Nabatiyeh
- City
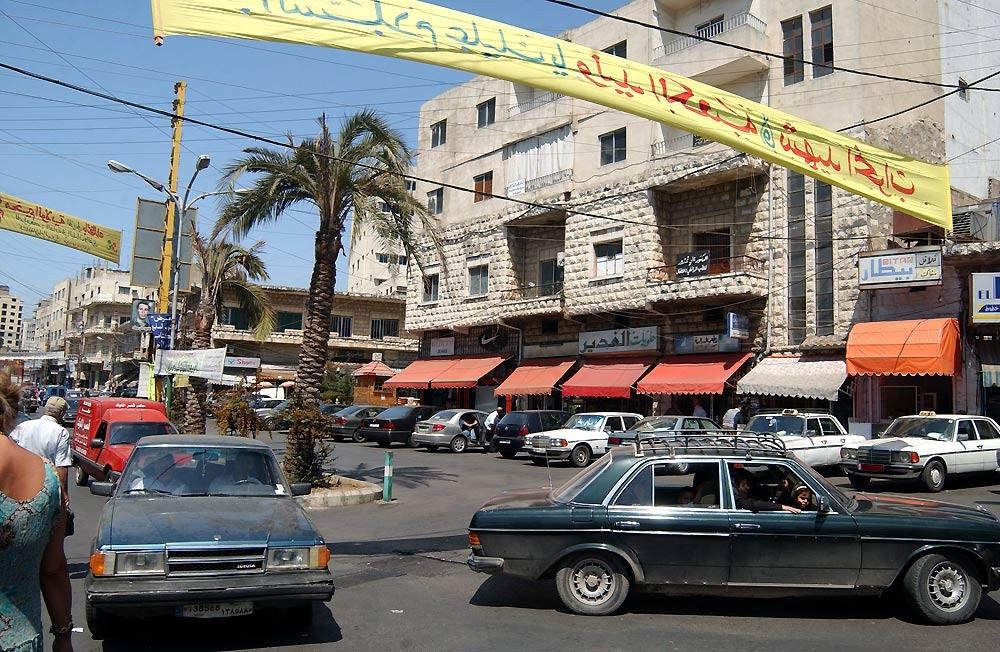
- Nabatieh, 2006

- Location within Lebanon Location in the Levant
- Coordinates: 33°22′38″N 35°29′1″E
- Grid position: 125/160 L
- Country: Lebanon
- Governorate: Nabatieh Governorate
- District: Nabatieh District

Area
  - City: 8 km^{2} (3.1 sq mi)
  - Metro: 21 km^{2} (8.1 sq mi)
- Elevation: 418 m (1,371 ft)

Population
  - City: 40,000
  - Metro: 85,000
- Time zone: UTC+2 (EET)
  - Summer (DST): UTC+3 (EEST)
- Dialing code: +961

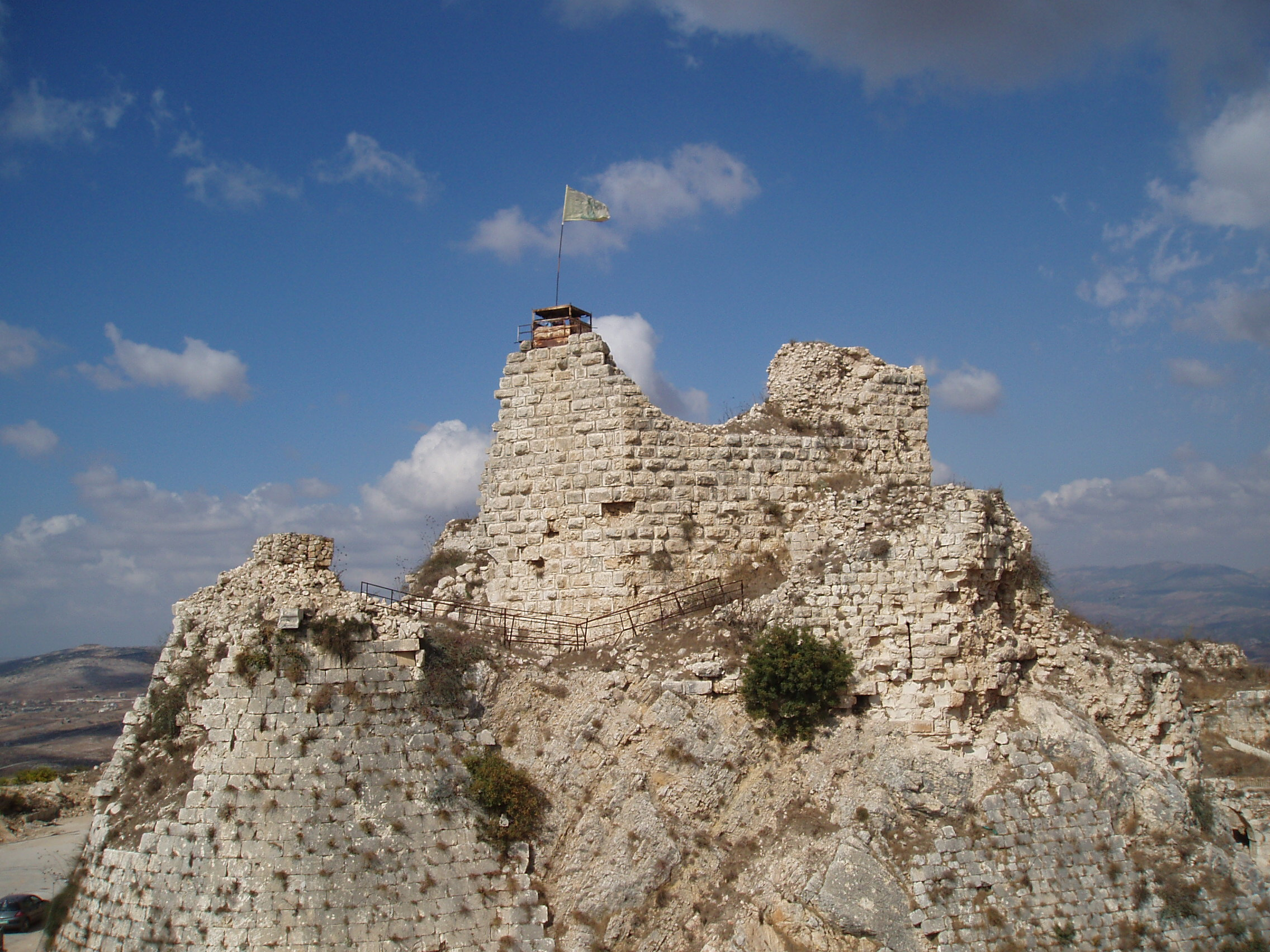
Beaufort Castle, a Crusader castle near Nabatieh

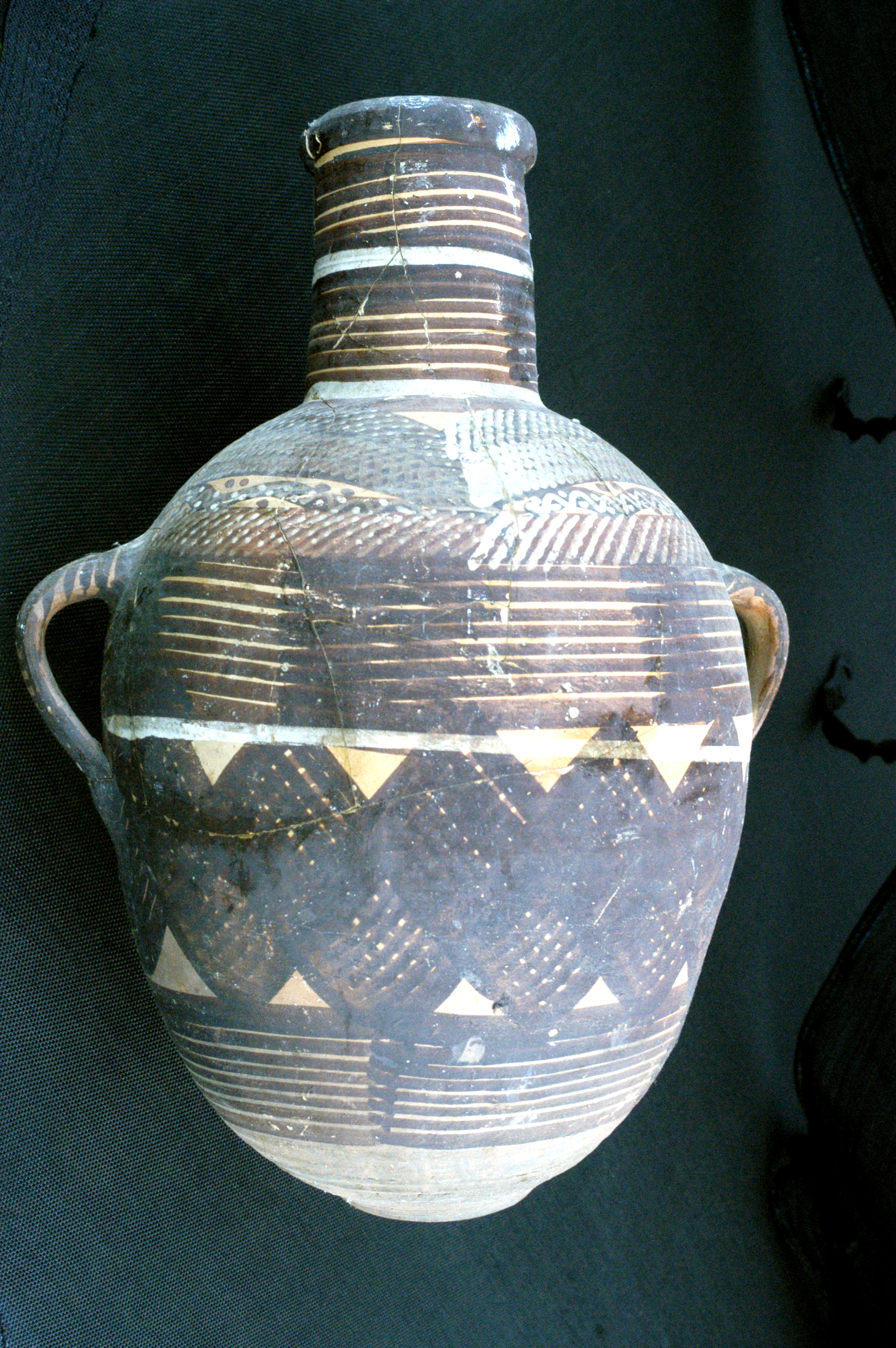
Water pot, 30 inches high, made in Nabatieh c. 1960

Nabatieh or Nabatiyeh (Arabic: النبطية, romanized: an-Nabaṭiyya, IPA: [nabɑˈtˤɪjje]; Classical Syriac: ܐܠܢܒܛܝܥ) is the largest city in the Nabatieh Governorate of southern Lebanon. It serves as the administrative center of both the governorate (mohafazat) and the district (kaza) of Nabatieh, and is the principal city of the Jabal Amil region. The population is uncertain, as Lebanon has not conducted a national census since 1932; estimates range from 25,000 to 100,000 inhabitants. The city is predominantly inhabited by Shia Muslims. Nabatieh is an important economic, administrative, and cultural center, located approximately 73 km (45 mi) south of Beirut.

Nabatieh has been affected by multiple Israeli military operations and conflicts, including the 1978, 1982, 1993, 1996, and 2006 conflicts in Lebanon, as well as strikes during the 2023–2024 Israel–Hezbollah conflict, subsequent ceasefire period and the 2026 Lebanon war. The city has frequently been targeted because of its role as a major administrative, economic, and symbolic center for Hezbollah in southern Lebanon.

== History ==
=== Nabateans ===
The most accepted theory is related to the Nabateans (Arabic: النبطي, romanized: an-Nabaṭī), an ancient Arab civilization that inhabited northern Arabia and the southern Levant. The name of the city is a feminine, a form which would have been used to name cities (e.g. Alexandria in Egypt).

Alternatively, this form of the word may have been in the genitive case as well due to the presence of a definite article. In addition, the feminization may have been used for noun agreement, therefore the city may have been referred to in some variation by its early inhabitants as al-Qarya an-Nabaṭiyya (القرية النبطية), "the village of the Nabateans" or possibly some other toponym using the feminine form. Due to the city's possible origins as a trading outpost (explained below), it could have also been as-Sūq an-Nabaṭiyya (السوق النبطية) "the market of the Nabateans", or some other variant which would have gradually been reduced to simply النبطية.

The Nabatean Kingdom (3rd century BC – 106 AD) extended its greatest height between 85–71 BC in which they controlled Damascus. Between this period and the Roman period, there have been instances of Nabatean inscriptions and coinage in Sidon, which would have been the closest major port to Nabatieh. Therefore, being in the hinterland and at the foothills of the Lebanon mountains between Sidon and Damascus, the city may have been a trading stop or station for the Nabateans, thereby owing its name to them. One modern tradition that may have carried over from this ancient foundation is the weekly souk (souq el-tanen) which takes place every Monday and merchants from surrounding villages come to sell their goods.

=== Antiquity ===
While the area has been inhabited since the Neolithic era (see Kfar Tebnit), the greatest archaeological discovery in the area to date occurred in the 1920s by Pierre Paul-Émile Guigues while surveying necropolises in the area. Giugues found two arrowheads, one of which had a Phoenician inscription (KAI 20) which reads: arrow of Addo, son of Akki. This arrowhead was dated based on its paleography to the 10th century BCE. It is currently housed in the Louvre. Guigues also claimed that the tomb in which the arrows were found was reused into the Hellenistic period. This discovery occurred on a tell between lower and upper Nabatieh called "el-Ruwisseh" (area of what is now Ned el-Shqif).

=== Ottoman era ===
In the 1596 tax records, it was named Nabatiyya al-Tahta (النبطية التحتا, an-Nabaṭiyya at-Taḥtā, 'Lower Nabatieh', distinct from nearby 'Upper Nabatieh'), located in the Ottoman nahiya (subdistrict) of Sagif under the liwa' (district) of Safad, with a population of 151 households and 28 bachelors, all Muslim. The villagers paid taxes on goats and beehives, "occasional revenues", a press for olive oil or grape syrup, a market toll, and a fixed sum; a total of 9,030 akçe.

In 1875, Victor Guérin found Nabatieh et-Tahta to have 1,500 Metuali inhabitants, in addition to 300 Christians; mostly Greek Orthodox, but also some Maronites.

=== Tobacco protest ===
On 22nd of January 1973, thousands of tobacco workers occupied the regional offices of the Régie tobacco monopoly in Nabatieh. They demanded higher purchase prices for tobacco, an end to speculation in cultivation licenses, limits on cultivation areas and the nationalization of the still French-owned Régie.

=== Israeli attacks in late 20th and early 21st centuries ===
During Israel's first full scale invasion of Lebanon, Operation Litani, March 1978, most of the population of Nabatieh fled their homes in a bombardment that, according to the New York Times, left "[h]ardly a house [ ] intact". The 20 March report continues "There are only 25 to 30 families left in the once prosperous farm center of 40,000 inhabitants".

Following the 1982 Israeli invasion of southern Lebanon, in October 1983 an Israel Defense Forces (IDF) convoy drove into Nabatieh at the height of the Ashura celebrations. In the ensuing confrontation a jeep was overturned and set on fire. The soldiers responded with rifle fire and grenades and one person was killed and several wounded. This incident, as well as the assassination of Sheikh Ragheb Harb, is seen as the turning point in the Shia community's relationship with the occupying Israelis.

After Israel's withdrawal in 1985 Nabatieh was on the edge of the so-called security zone.

On 24 August 1989 an IAF air strike on Ain Abu Suwar near Nabatieh killed nine people. Reports stated that the dead were refugees from the fighting in Beirut. In early December the same year Nabatieh was shelled for three days by the South Lebanon Army. Four people were killed and eighteen wounded.

On 17 May 1991 two bombs exploded in Nabatieh killing four people including a member of the South Lebanon Army. A statement from the Islamic Jihad Organization claimed responsibility. Five months later the area around Nabatieh was subjected to eight days of shelling by the South Lebanon Army and the Israeli Army. The bombardment culminated on 1 November with a series of IAF airstrikes which destroyed two bridges between Nabatieh and Iqlim al Tuffah. The Israeli offensive coincided with the start of the Madrid Peace Conference.

During Operation Accountability, 25–31 July 1993, Nabatieh was extensively damaged by Israel artillery fire and airstrikes. Fifty-five towns and villages were heavily damaged during the offensive.

The IDF shelled Nabatieh again on 21 March 1994; during the bombardment a school was hit killing a twelve year old girl and wounding twenty-two others. Earlier in the day Hezbollah had killed two Israeli soldiers and three SLA militiamen. Just over four months later, 4 August, the Israeli Air Force launched three airstrikes in the Nabatieh area which killed eight civilians and wounded eighteen. On 20 October Israeli shelling killed five civilians in Nabatieh. The day before the SLA had killed two civilians after their patrol hit a land mine. The shelling originated from the IDF military outpost base, Dabshe, which was situated on a hill overlooking Nabatieh. The following week, 29 October, twenty Hizbollah fighters overran and set fire to the base. A video later broadcast by al-Manar showing the Hezbollah flag flying over the Israeli base caused a sensation. At the time it was estimated that Nabatieh had a population of 60,000.

On 14 March 1995 the Lebanese cabinet held a symbolic session in Nabatieh to mark the 14th anniversary of the 1978 invasion. The meeting called for the implementation of the seventeen year old United Nations Security Council Resolution 425. Later that year, 8 July, two teenage sisters and their four-year-old brother were killed when the town was hit by anti-personnel shells filled with steel darts, which are banned by the Geneva Conventions. It was reported that Prime Minister Yitzhak Rabin and Chief of Staff Amnon Lipkin-Shahak 'reproved' the unit involved. Ten rockets were fired into northern Israel.

During Operation Grapes of Wrath by the IDF on 18 April 1996, nine members of one family in Nabatieh were killed in the seventeen day bombardment when their house was destroyed.

On the night of 16–17 August 2024, Israeli Air Force jets attacked a warehouse in Nabatieh, killing at least 11 people and injuring four others.

On Sunday 13 October 2024, a number of people were killed as a result of Israeli airstrikes on the town's Ottoman-era market. A remnant of a US-made munition was found at the site of the airstrike on the Ottoman-era market. Due to the fire, the number of injured was not determined.

On 16 October 2024, the Israel Defense Forces targeted a meeting of the municipal council of Nabatieh and struck it with 10 airstrikes, killing at least 16 municipality staff, including the mayor of Nabatieh, and injuring more than 52. Lebanon accused Israel of carrying out a massacre but Israel claimed they were targeting "military targets".

The Israeli military has put a focus on Nabatieh in its 2026 war against Lebanon with the aim of putting pressure on Lebanon's Shia population by destroying their economic engines as Nabatieh is the "administrative, economic, and symbolic heart of the south". The IDF issued forced displacement orders for the city on 26 May despite of a ceasefire reached in April and continued airstrikes against it, causing the city to become "effectively empty". Israel claims it only targets Hezbollah military targets but has repeatedly targeted and killed civilians, including paramedics and journalists.

== Historic structures ==
=== Beaufort Castle ===
On the top of a hill overlooking the southern Beqaa Valley towards Damascus stands Belfort or Beaufort castle, known in Arabic as Shqif Arnun, the word shqif being a Syriac term meaning high rock. The castle, although looking inaccessible, can be reached with little difficulty from the village of Arnoun, which lies 7 kilometres (4.3 mi) southeast of Nabatieh. There is no conclusive evidence for the age of this castle or for who built it.

=== Mosques ===
Nabatieh has two historic mosques. One was built in the 16th century and is in the centre of the town. Another, known as "the Mosque of the Prophet," dates to the Mamluk period and is located in Nabatieh al Fawqa.

== Demographics ==
Religion in Nabatieh (2014)
| Religion | Percent |
| Shia Islam | 93.30% |
| Sunni Islam | 3.99% |
| Christian | 2.21% |
| Others | 0.50% |

In 2014, Muslims made up 97.33% and Christians made up 2.21% of registered voters in Nabatieh. 93.30% of the voters were Shiite Muslims.

The population is not accurately known as by as no census has been taken in Lebanon since the 1930s; estimates range from 15,000 to 120,000. A 2006 population estimate by the now-closed German population site called World Gazetteer put the population at 100,541, which would make it the fifth largest city in Lebanon, according to the 2006 population estimates of Lebanese cities, but after an update in either 2007 or 2008 and calculations for the following years the 2013 population estimate turned out to be much lower at 36,593 and making the city the 11th largest in Lebanon behind Tyre, Bint Jbeil, Zahlé, Sidon, Baalbek, Jounieh, Tripoli and Beirut according to those 2013 estimates. It is the main city in the Jabal Amel area and the chief center for both the mohafazat, or governorate, and the kaza, or canton both also called Nabatieh. Nabatieh is an important town both economically and culturally.

=== Religion ===
The inhabitants of Nabatieh are predominantly Shi'a Muslims, with a significant minority of Greek Catholics (Melkites). The Nabatieh district has three representatives in the Lebanese government, all belonging to the Shi'a religion, in accordance with Lebanon's sectarian parliamentary system.

== Human resources ==
=== Education ===
Mission laïque française Lycée Franco-Libanais Habbouche-Nabatieh is located few km to the north of the city. The National Evangelical School (Known previously as American School for Girls in Nabatieh) was founded in 1925. The Christian College Notre Dame des Soeurs Antonines is one of the oldest institutions in the city.

== Culture ==
A market is held every Monday where traders and visitors from neighbouring villages gather in the centre of the town to exchange their goods in an area known in Arabic as the Souq at-Tanen. There are also branches of several banks, hospitals, restaurants and cultural centres of interest to tourists.

Every year, the city commemorates the Battle of Karbala to remember the martyrdom of Imam al Husayn.

== Notable people ==
- Ahmad Rida (1872–1953)
- Muhammad Jaber Al Safa (1875–1945)
- Ahmed Aref El-Zein (1884–1960)
- Hassan Kamel Al-Sabbah (1894–1935)
- Anwar Sabbah (1933–2024), politician and government minister
- Hisham Jaber (born 1942)
- Yassine Jaber (born 1951)
- Ali Jaber (born 1961)

== Bibliography ==
- Hütteroth, W.-D.; Abdulfattah, K. (1977). Historical Geography of Palestine, Transjordan and Southern Syria in the Late 16th Century. Erlanger Geographische Arbeiten, Sonderband 5. Erlangen, Germany: Vorstand der Fränkischen Geographischen Gesellschaft. ISBN 3-920405-41-2. Archived from the original on 8 October 2024.
- Guérin, V. (1880). Description Géographique Historique et Archéologique de la Palestine (in French). Vol. 3: Galilee, pt. 2. Paris: L'Imprimerie Nationale.
- Rhode, H. (1979). Administration and Population of the Sancak of Safed in the Sixteenth Century (PhD). Columbia University. Archived from the original on 1 March 2020.
