= Farid Makari =

Lebanese politician (1947–2022)

Farid Nabil Makari (Arabic: فريد نبيل مكاري; 24 October 1947 – 17 August 2022) was a Lebanese politician.

== Early life and education ==
Makari was born in Anfeh on 24 October 1947. He graduated from University of Texas at Austin with a degree in civil engineering. He later joined Saudi Oger and Oger International, companies founded by former Lebanese Prime Minister Rafik Hariri.

== Career ==
In 1992, Makari entered politics, winning the Eastern Orthodox parliamentary seat in the Koura district. He was re-elected in 1996, 2000, 2005, and 2009. Between 1995 and 1996, Makari was appointed Minister of Information in Rafik Hariri's government. On 25 September 1996, Prime Minister Hariri's government issued a decree ordering the closure of Lebanon’s 150 privately owned radio stations and 50 TV stations. This followed Information Minister Farid Makari’s 17 September order banning the broadcast of news programs. Licenses were to be issued to Future Television, owned by Hariri, the Christian-owned Lebanese Broadcasting Corporation International (LBCI), Murr Television (MTV), owned by the brother of Interior Minister Michel Murr, and the National Broadcasting Network (NBN), being set up by Nabih Berri. The radio stations that were to receive licenses included Hariri’s Orient Radio, Berri’s NBN, and the Lebanese Forces’s Voice of Free Lebanon. It was estimated that this move would result in the loss of 5,000 jobs.

In 2005, following Hariri's assassination, Makari became one of the prominent figures in the Cedar Revolution. That same year, the constituents of Koura elected him to Parliament for a fourth term as part of the majority 14 March bloc, and he was elected Deputy Speaker of Parliament. In this role, Makari adopted and espoused many strong political positions.

== Death ==
Makari died on 17 August 2022, at the age of 74.
