= Attack on Nabatieh municipal council =

2024 Israeli air raid

October 2024 Nabatieh airstrike
- Part of the 2024 Israeli invasion of Lebanon
- Location within Lebanon
- Location: Nabatieh, Lebanon
- Date: 16 October 2024
- Target: Municipal council
- Attack type: Airstrikes, massacre
- Deaths: 16+ municipality staff (including the mayor)
- Injuries: 52+
- Perpetrator: Israel Defense Forces

On 16 October 2024, one hour after issuing an evacuation notice, the Israel Defense Forces targeted a meeting of the municipal council of Nabatieh in Lebanon and struck it with 10 airstrikes, killing at least 16 municipality staff, including the mayor of Nabatieh, and injuring more than 52. Lebanon accused Israel of carrying out a massacre, but Israel responded by saying they were targeting military targets.

== Background ==
On 1 October 2024, Israel invaded Southern Lebanon in an escalation of the ongoing Israel–Hezbollah conflict, a spillover. This was a result of major attacks that occurred month prior.

In September 2024, the Israel Defense Forces launched a series of airstrikes across Lebanon, sparking significant controversy.

== Airstrike ==
Israel had issued an evacuation notice for the building one hour the airstrike took place.

Israel conducted ten airstrikes on the municipal headquarters in Nabatieh, while municipal staff were having a meeting inside and co-ordinating aid for civilians remaining in the town. The airstrike killed at least 16 municipality staff, including the mayor of Nabatieh, Ahmad Kahil, and injured at least 52 others. The governor of Nabatieh Governorate reported that the death toll could increase as the rubble was still being searched.

Israel claimed to have attacked "Hezbollah targets", including "military buildings, military headquarters and munitions warehouses".

== Reactions ==
Lebanese prime minister Najib Mikati condemned the attack and said that it "intentionally targeted a meeting of the municipal council to discuss the city's service and relief situation".

The United Nations Special Coordinator for Lebanon, Jeanine Hennis-Plasschaert, said that civilian suffering in Lebanon is reaching an unprecedented level, and stressed that "civilians and civilian infrastructure must be protected at all times".

Mathew Miller, the spokesman for the US State Department said “We understand that Hezbollah does operate at times from...civilian homes...So Israel does have a right to go after those legitimate targets, but they need to do so in a way that protects...civilians.”
