= Albert Moukheiber =

- ألبير مخيبر
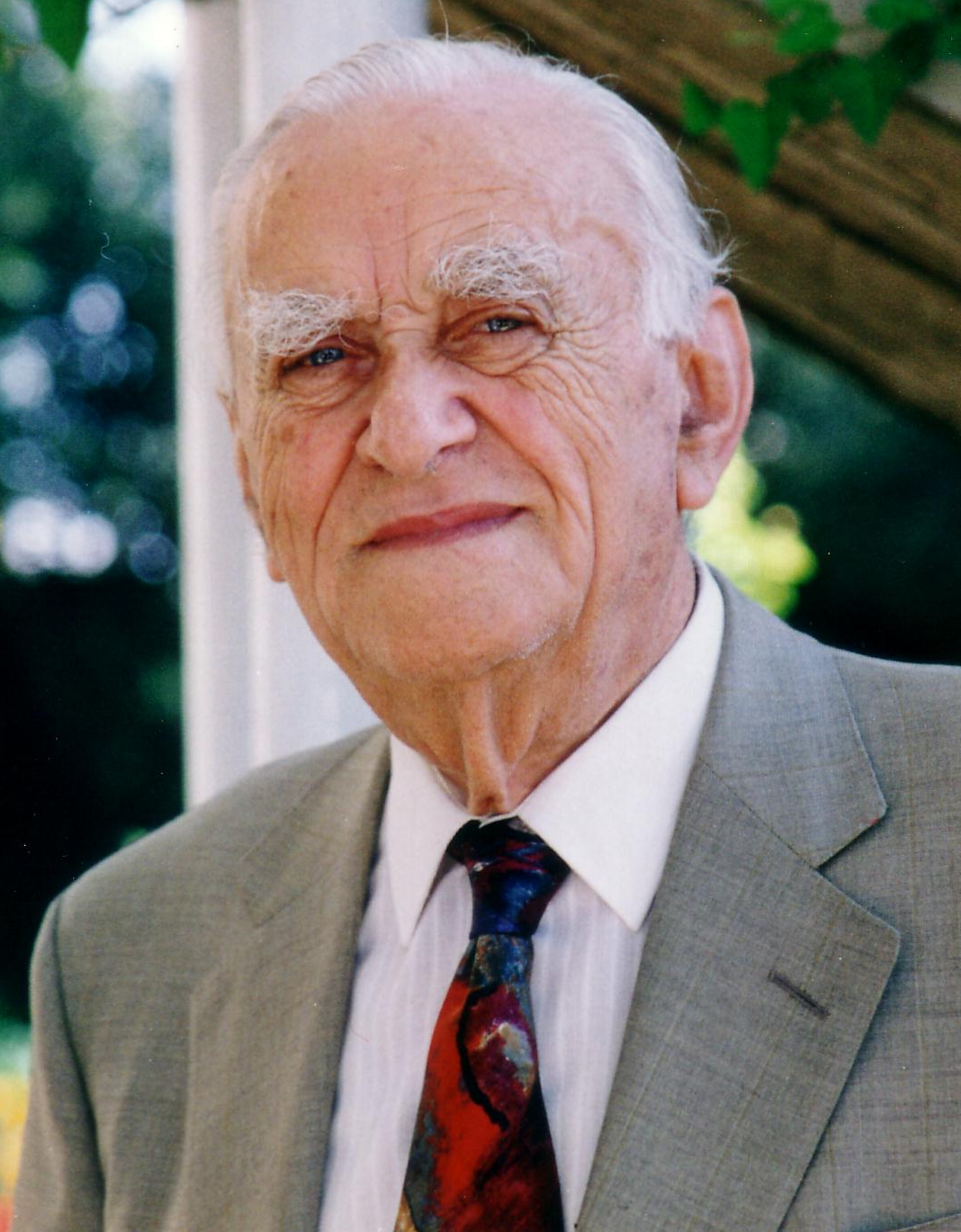

Deputy Prime Minister of Lebanon
- In office May 27, 1972 – April 25, 1973
- Preceded by: Ghassan Tueni
- Succeeded by: Fouad Ghosn

Personal details
- Born: 1912
- Died: 2002 (aged 89-90)
- Occupation: Politician, doctor

Albert Moukheiber (Arabic: ألبير مخيبر; 1912 - 2002) was a Lebanese doctor, politician and a former Lebanese Parliamentary member who was widely known for his opposition to the Syrian military presence in Lebanon. He was also co-founder of the National Bloc Party.

== Career ==
Albert Moukheiber was a deputy in the Lebanese Parliament since 1957, with the acceptation of 1992. He won in the 1960 elections and in 1964 elections in alliance with the National Liberal Party under the leadership of Camille Chamoun, and in 1968 he won his parliamentary seat in alliance with Representative Jamil Lahoud and in 1972. He was also elected as a deputy in the year 2000, representing the district of Matn, but he did not complete his term and died two years in his term.

=== Ministries ===
Among the many positions he held during his long political career were the position of Deputy Prime Minister in the government of President Saeb Salam (1972-1973), Minister of State in the government of Prime Minister Takieddin Solh (1973-1974), and Deputy Speaker of the Lebanese Parliament.

== Death ==
He died in 2002 at the age of 90, before completing his term of office and his political legacy was succeeded by his nephew Ghassan Moukheiber.
