= Dlebta =

Dlebta دلبتا
- Municipality
- Location in Lebanon
- Coordinates: 34°0′31″N 35°41′27″E
- Country: Lebanon
- Governorate: Keserwan-Jbeil
- District: Keserwan

Area
  - Total: 3.23 km^{2} (1.247 sq mi)
- Elevation: 670 m (2,200 ft)
- Time zone: UTC+2 (EET)
  - Summer (DST): UTC+3 (EEST)

Dlebta (Arabic: دلبتا, romanized: Dlebtā; also spelled Delebteh) is a village and municipality located in the Keserwan District of the Keserwan-Jbeil Governorate in Lebanon. The village is 26 kilometres (16 mi) north of Beirut. It has an average elevation of 670 meters above sea level and a total land area of 323 hectares. Dlebta's inhabitants are Maronite Catholics and other Christians.
