= Fouad Boutros =

Lebanese politician and diplomat (1917–2016)

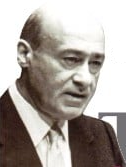
Fouad Boutros

Fouad Boutros (Arabic: فؤاد بطرس; 5 November 1917 in Achrafieh – 4 January 2016) was a Lebanese politician and diplomat. He held several cabinet posts in the 1960s and 1970s.

== Political career ==
He was first elected member of the Parliament of Lebanon in the 1960 Lebanese general election to one of the Greek Orthodox posts for Beirut. Boutros served as defense minister two times: in 1966 and from 1976 to 1978. He was appointed deputy prime minister in 1966, in 1968 and 1976-1982. He was the minister of foreign affairs in the period between 1976 and 1982.

=== Assassination attempt ===
On 1 November 1978, at the Saint Nicholas Church crossing in Achrafieh, Kataeb Regulatory Forces (KRF) militiamen ambushed the motorcade of the Defense and Foreign Affairs Minister Fouad Boutros, escorted by a commando detachment from the Counter-sabotage regiment (Arabic: Moukafaha). Four commandos were wounded and several others taken prisoner, including the commander of the escort, Lieutenant Kozhayya Chamoun, who subsequently disappeared without a trace while in KRF custody. The ambush was carried out in retaliation for the death of the pro-Phalangist Captain Samir el-Achkar, leader of the dissident Lebanese Army Revolutionary Command (LARC) and a close friend of Bashir Gemayel, during a raid by the Moukafaha commandos on his headquarters at Mtaileb in the Matn District earlier that same day.
