= Takieddin el-Solh =

Prime Minister of Lebanon (1908–1988)

- تقي الدين الصلح
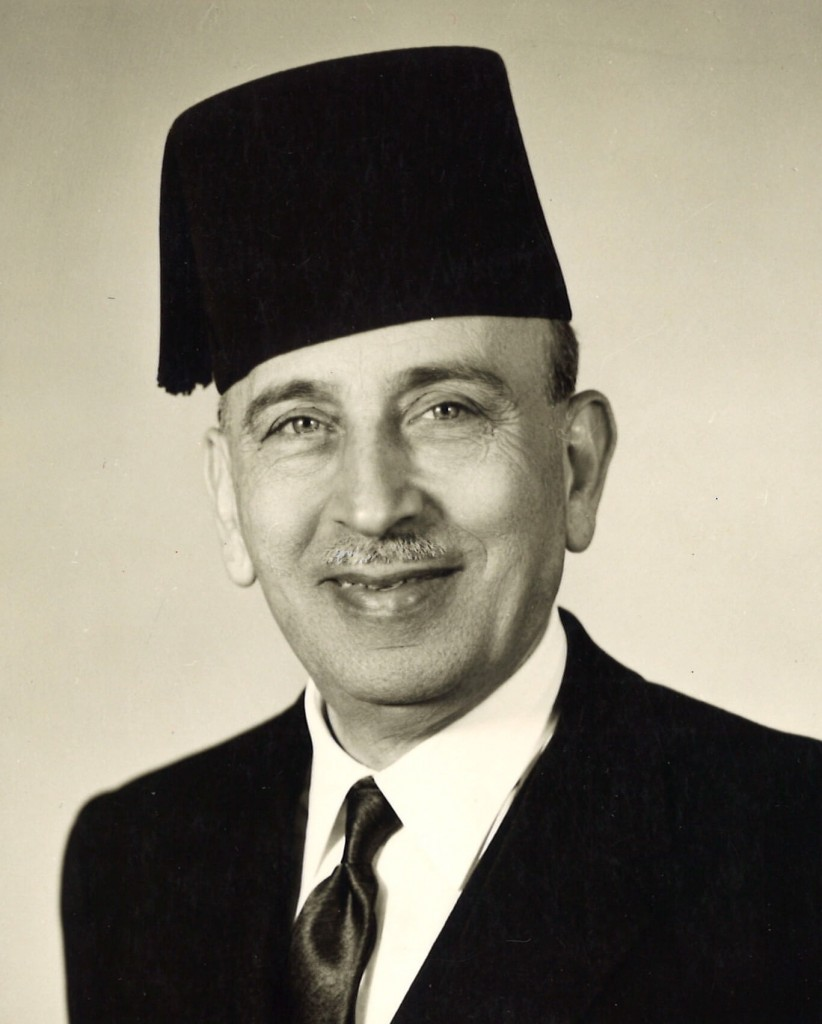
- El-Solh in 1957

Prime Minister of Lebanon
- In office 21 June 1973 – 31 October 1974
- President: Suleiman Frangieh
- Preceded by: Amin al-Hafez
- Succeeded by: Rachid Solh

Personal details
- Born: 1908 Sidon, Ottoman Empire
- Died: 27 November 1988 (age 79–80) Paris, France
- Religion: Sunni Islam

Takieddin el-Solh (also Takieddin Solh, Takieddin as-Solh; Arabic: تقي الدين الصلح) (1908 – 27 November 1988) was a Lebanese politician who served as the Prime Minister of Lebanon from 1973 to 1974, and again briefly in 1980.

El-Solh was born in Sidon, Lebanon. A Sunni Muslim, he was a legislator representing the Beqaa Valley from 1957–1960 and 1964–1968. In 1964–1965 he was Minister of the Interior in the Government of Hussein al-Oweini. In 1973, President Suleiman Frangieh named him Prime Minister and Minister for Finance. He served as Prime Minister until 1974, when he was succeeded by Rachid Solh. In July 1980, President Elias Sarkis asked el-Solh to form a government, but he was unable to do so and resigned in October.

His wife was Fadwa Barazi El-Solh.

Takieddin was known for wearing the tarboush. He was faced with extensive objection by the Syrians and was told to leave Lebanon. He spent his last days in Paris, where he died of a heart attack, aged 80.

== In art and culture ==
The mansion Takieddin el-Solh and Fadwa Barazi El-Solh had inhabited was the subject of an installation displaying photographs, newspapers, films, texts and drawings in the exhibition of Gregory Buchakjian, Abandoned Dwellings of Beirut, that took place at the Villa Empain in Brussels, 2019.

Political offices
Preceded by Amin al-Hafez	Prime Minister of Lebanon; 1973–74	Succeeded by Rachid Solh
Preceded by Fouad Naffah	Minister of Finance; 1973–74	Succeeded by Khalid Jumblatt
Preceded by Selim al-Hoss	Prime Minister of Lebanon; 1980	Succeeded by Shafik Wazzan
