= Élias Sarkis =

President of Lebanon from 1976 to 1982

His Excellency Élias Sarkis OM ONC
- إلياس سركيس
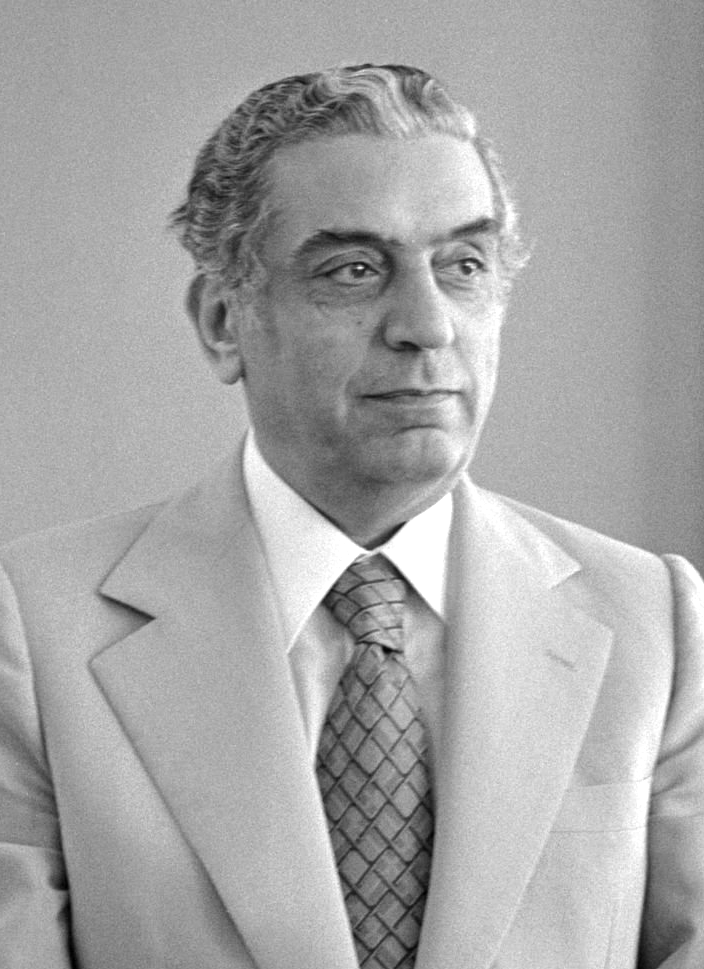
- Sarkis in 1976

6th President of Lebanon
- In office 23 September 1976 – 22 September 1982
- Prime Minister: Rashid Karami; Selim Hoss; Takieddine Solh; Shafik Wazzan
- Preceded by: Suleiman Frangieh
- Succeeded by: Bachir Gemayel (elected); Amine Gemayel

Personal details
- Born: Élias Youssef Sarkis; 20 July 1924 Chebanieh, Lebanon
- Died: 27 June 1985 (aged 60) Paris, France
- Resting place: Chebanieh
- Party: Chehabist
- Education: Saint Joseph University
- Profession: Lawyer
- Religion: Maronite Catholic

Élias Sarkis (Arabic: إلياس سركيس; 20 July 1924 – 27 June 1985) was a Lebanese lawyer and politician who served as the 6th president of Lebanon from 1976 to 1982, during the first half of Lebanon's 15-year civil war.

== Early life and education ==
Élias Sarkis was born on 20 July 1924 in Chebanieh, a mixed Christian-Druze mountain village in Baabda district, to a shopkeeping family. His family was Maronite Christian.

Sarkis attended the Chebanieh School and Frères School in Beirut. He began to work as a railway clerk during his university education, and then, graduated with a law degree from Saint Joseph University in 1948.

== Career ==
After graduation, Sarkis worked as a lawyer for three years. Next, he became the protege of Lebanese army commander Fuad Chehab who would be the Lebanese president in 1958. Sarkis was then appointed magistrate of the court of accounts and then, director general of the chamber of the presidency of the Republic in 1953.

Later, he was appointed governor of the central bank of Lebanon in 1968 and his tenure lasted for 9 years. His appointment was upon the request of then-president Charles Helou, who asked him to reorganize the Lebanese banking systems facing a bank crisis in 1968. Sarkis was responsible for the decision to increase BDL’s gold reserves between the late 60s and early 70s. Lebanon’s gold is roughly equivalent to 30% of its pre-crisis GDP and is the 17th largest gold reserves holder in the world.

== Presidency ==
Sarkis contested the presidential election of 1970 as Chehab's protégé and was expected to win but was defeated by Suleiman Frangieh by a single vote.

Sarkis was, however, elected President for six-year term on 8 May 1976, while the Lebanese Civil War was raging. He was a candidate of Damascus and preferred president of Hafez al-Assad.

The election was held in the Versailles-style Esseily Villa, a private residence in Southeastern Beirut, since The National Assembly building was not safe due to ongoing attacks and battle. Sixty-six members of the Assembly elected him president on 8 May 1976. On the other hand, twenty-nine members of the Assembly boycotted the session. These members were among leftist and Palestinian groups. His sworn ceremony could not also be held at the Assembly, and he had to sworn at a hotel in the eastern city of Shtaura, 25 miles from Beirut. Sarkis could move to office four months after his election on 23 September 1976, since former President Frangieh objected at first to leave office. Sarkis could appoint Salim Hoss as prime minister in December 1976.

When Sarkis effectively began to serve as the President, he could not forge a lasting accommodation between Christian and Muslim factions. Also, the growing independent power of the Palestinian guerrillas in Lebanon prompted two large-scale Israeli attacks, in 1978 and 1982. Several nationalist and leftist political parties and organizations created the Lebanese National Movement (LNM) under the leadership of Kamal Jumblatt in 1976. The conservative forces led by the Christian Kataeib (Phalange) Party was another block called the Lebanese Front.

President Sarkis tried various initiatives to find a negotiated settlement to the conflict, but all were unsuccessful. Because these two groups had their own goals. The Lebanese Front was gradually strengthened its position, awaiting favorable regional developments to impose its own will. The LNM, on the other hand, was too dependent on the Palestinians and unable to initiate a political negotiation process in ceasing the civil war. In November 1976, Sarkis wanted to include Druze za'im Kamal Jumblatt in the cabinet. However, Hafez al-Assad did not permit it due to Jumblatt's clear opposition to Syria's increasing influence in Lebanon.

On 5 March 1980, Sarkis developed his policy as part of his attempts to create national accord: unity, independence, parliamentarian democracy, rejecting the Camp David Accords between Egypt and Israel. In June 1980, Salim Hoss resigned in protest against his inability to create peace in Lebanon. After much difficulties, Sarkis was able to appoint Shafik Wazzan as new prime minister. Sarkis was described as one who was in office but not in power.

Just before the end of his term in 1982, Israel invaded southern Lebanon in the 1982 Lebanon War and had advanced to the outskirts of Beirut. He organized a peacekeeping force involving U.S., British, French and Italian troops in Beirut after the Israeli invasion of Lebanon to drive out the Palestine Liberation Organization in 1982. In addition, Sarkis formed the rescue committee in 1982 to make arrangements regarding the results of the Israeli invasion. The members of the committee included the Amal movement’s leader, Nabih Berri, and the hardline Christian leader Bashir Gemayel. The body was significant in that it caused tensions in the Amal movement, because Hussein Musawi left the Amal protesting against Berri and founded Islamic Amal after this event.

Sarkis gained the respect of many Lebanese during his term, but critics accused him of indecisiveness. However, he was regarded as the choice of Syria but not the Muslim-Palestinian alliance. For that reason, 29 members of the Assembly boycotted the election session.

== Succession ==
Sarkis was to be succeeded by Bachir Gemayel, who was elected president on 23 August 1982 with 57 votes. However, Gemayel was assassinated 21 days before he was due to take office. Amine Gemayel, Bachir's brother, was subsequently elected in his stead, and Sarkis handed the presidency over to him on 23 September 1982.

== Illness and death ==
Sarkis died in Paris from cancer on 27 June 1985, at the age of 60. His body was returned to Lebanon. Then-Lebanese President Amine Gemayel led mourners at his funeral in Beirut on 29 June 1985. The requiem mass in East Beirut was attended by a Syrian delegation led by a government minister representing then Syrian president Hafez al-Assad. His body was buried in his hometown, Chebanieh, on the same day.

Political offices
Preceded by Suleiman Frangieh	President of Lebanon; 1976–1982	Succeeded by Bachir Gemayel
