= Shafik Wazzan =

Prime Minister of Lebanon

- شفيق الوزان
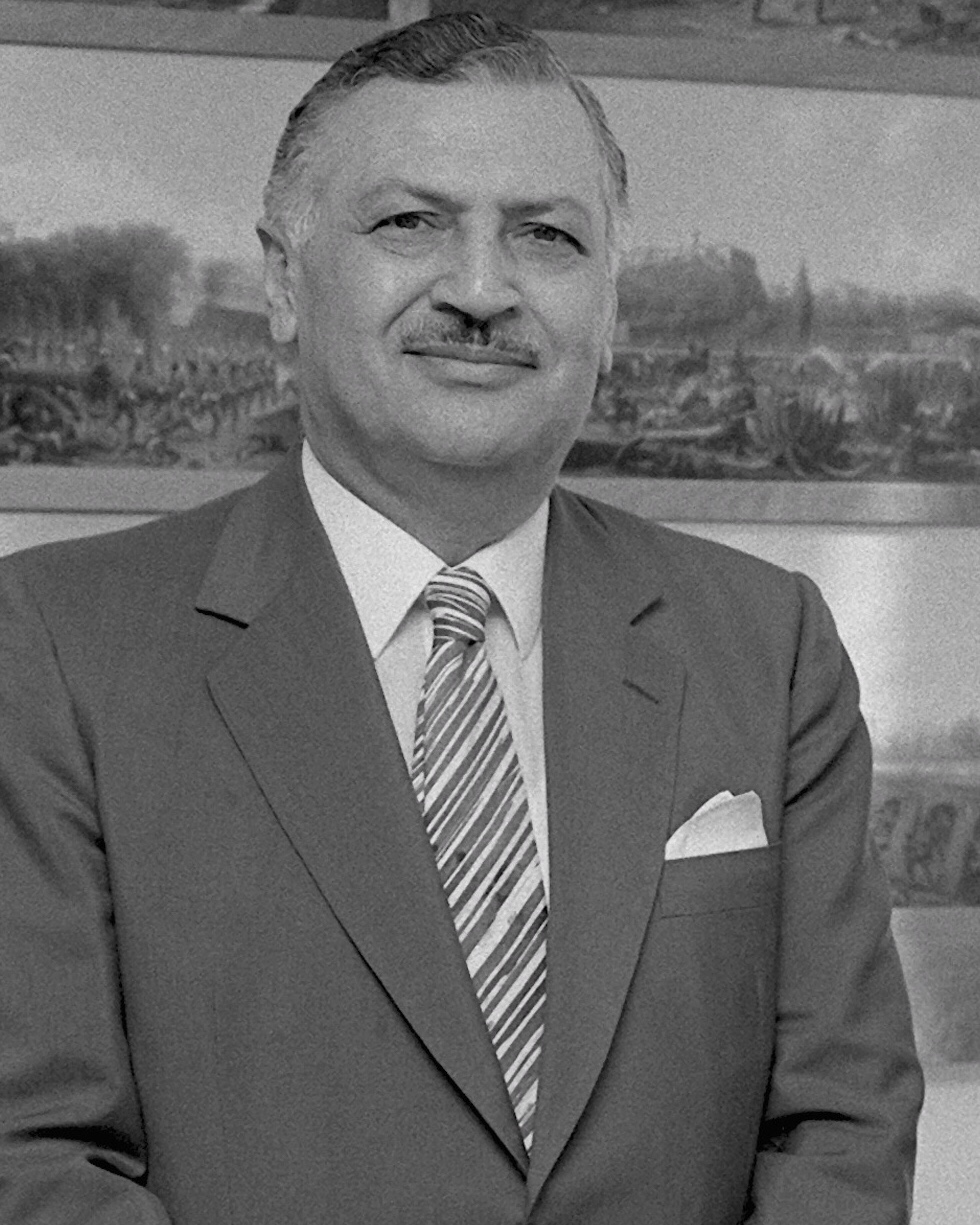
- Wazzan in 1983

Prime Minister of Lebanon
- In office 25 October 1980 – 30 April 1984
- President: Élias Sarkis; Bachir Gemayel (elect); Amine Gemayel
- Preceded by: Takieddin el-Solh
- Succeeded by: Rashid Karami

Personal details
- Born: 16 January 1925 Beirut, Lebanon
- Died: 8 July 1999 (aged 74) Beirut, Lebanon
- Party: Independent
- Children: 2

Shafik Al-Wazzan (Arabic: شفيق الوزان, January 16, 1925 – July 8, 1999) was a Lebanese politician who served as the 27th Prime Minister of Lebanon from 1980 until 1984. In December 1991, Wazzan was wounded when a car bomb exploded in the Beirut neighborhood of Basta Al Fouka (where he lived) as he was passing through in an armored car.

== Biography ==
After political strife had left Lebanon without a government for 137 days, Wazzan was urged into office. He oversaw the withdrawal of Palestinian guerillas from Beirut in 1982.

Wazzan died in 1999 at the age of 74. He was survived by a son and a daughter.

Political offices
Preceded by Takieddin as-Solh	Prime Minister of Lebanon; 25 October 1980 – 30 April 1984	Succeeded by Rashid Karami
