= Amin al-Hafez (Lebanon) =

Lebanese politician (1926–2009)

- أمين الحافظ
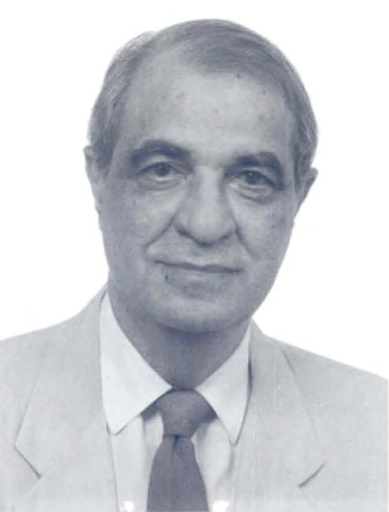

Prime Minister of Lebanon
- In office 25 April 1973 – 21 June 1973
- President: Suleiman Frangieh
- Preceded by: Saeb Salam
- Succeeded by: Takieddin el-Solh

Personal details
- Born: 28 January 1926; Tripoli, Lebanon
- Died: 13 July 2009 (aged 82–83); Beirut, Lebanon
- Religion: Sunni Islam

Amin al-Hafez (Arabic: أمين الحافظ; 28 January 1926–13 July 2009) was the prime minister of Lebanon from 25 April 1973 to 21 June 1973. He was also a long-running Member of Parliament for Tripoli in the Lebanese Parliament until 1996.

== Biography ==
Amin al-Hafez was born in 1926. He served a turbulent two-month term as Prime Minister of Lebanon after appointment by then Lebanese President Suleiman Franjieh and opposition of the Sunni leaders who refused to recognize his appointment. He resigned after just 2 months of serving, but continued representing his constituency of Tripoli in the Parliament.

He was married to Leila Osseiran who was a novelist. They married in 1948 and had a son, Ramzi, who is a journalist. Amin al-Hafez died aged 83 after a long-running battle with an undisclosed chronic illness on 13 July 2009.

== See also ==
- Cabinet of Amin Hafez
