= Salim Al-Huss =

Lebanese statesman (1929–2024)

Salim al-Huss
- سليم الحص
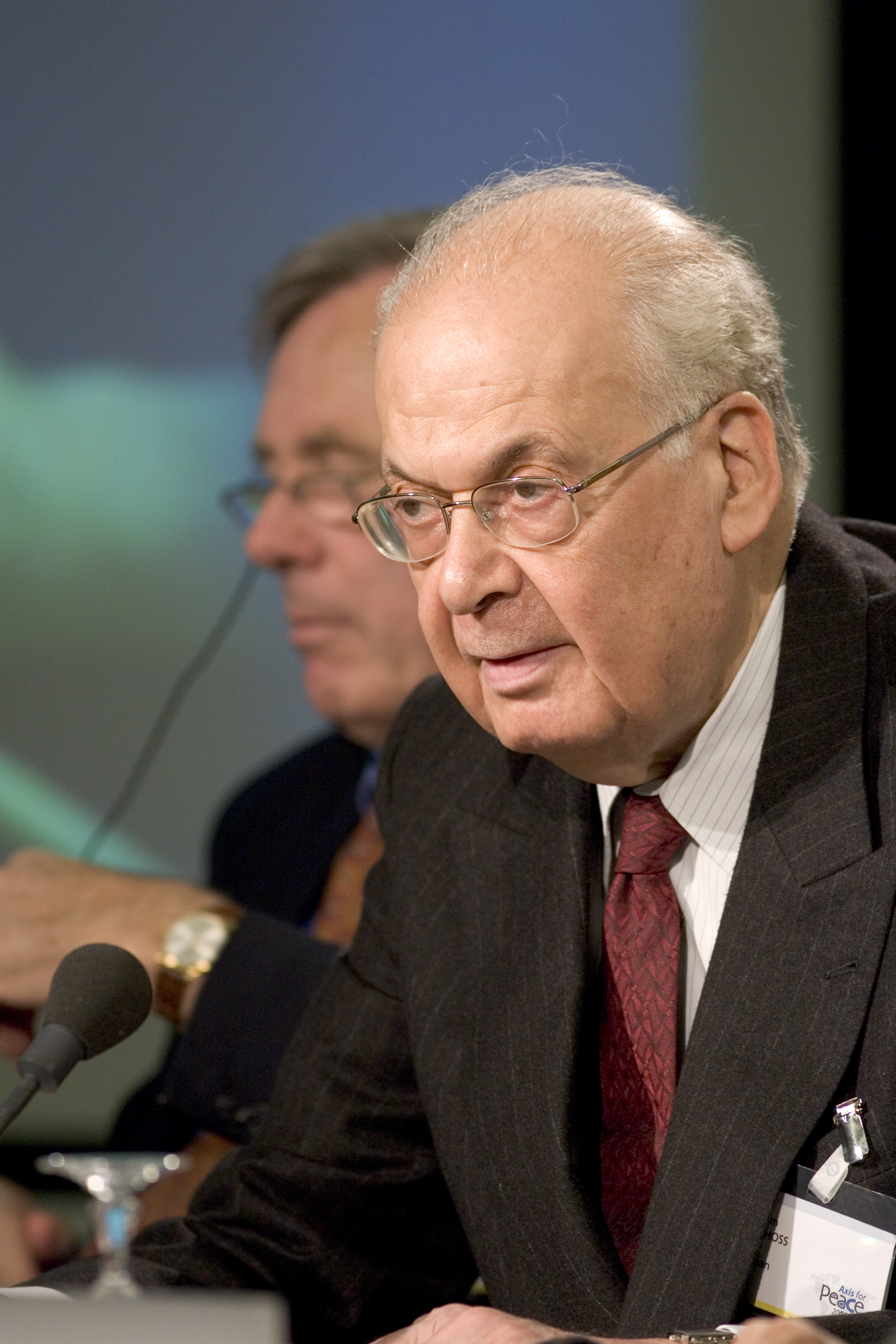
- Al-Huss in 2005

34th, 38th & 42nd Prime Minister of Lebanon
- In office 6 December 1998 – 23 October 2000
- President: Émile Lahoud
- Preceded by: Rafic Hariri
- Succeeded by: Rafic Hariri
- In office 2 June 1987 – 24 December 1990*
- President: See list: Amine Gemayel Himself (acting) René Moawad Himself (acting) Elias Hrawi
- Preceded by: Rashid Karami
- Succeeded by: Omar Karami
- In office 8 December 1976 – 20 July 1980
- President: Elias Sarkis
- Preceded by: Rashid Karami
- Succeeded by: Takieddin el-Solh

Acting President of Lebanon
- In office 22 November 1989 – 24 November 1989*
- Prime Minister: Himself
- Preceded by: René Moawad
- Succeeded by: Elias Hrawi
- In office 24 September 1988 – 5 November 1989*
- Prime Minister: Himself
- Preceded by: Amine Gemayel
- Succeeded by: René Moawad

Member of the Lebanese Parliament
- In office 20 October 1992 – 17 October 2000
- Constituency: Beirut

Personal details
- Born: Salim Ahmad al-Huss; 20 December 1929 Beirut, Lebanese Republic
- Died: 25 August 2024 (aged 94) Beirut, Lebanon
- Party: Independent
- Spouse: Leila Pharaoun (died 1990)
- Children: 1
- Education: American University of Beirut (BA); Indiana University Bloomington (PhD)
- *Al-Huss's term was disputed between 22 September 1988 and 13 October 1990 by Michel Aoun.

Salim Ahmad al-Huss (Arabic: سليم أحمد الحص, romanized: Salīm ʾAḥmad al-Ḥuṣṣ; 20 December 1929 – 25 August 2024), also spelled Selim El-Hoss, was a Lebanese economist and politician who served as the prime minister of Lebanon and a longtime Member of Parliament representing his hometown, Beirut. He was known as a technocrat.

== Early life and personal life ==
Salim al-Huss was born into a Sunni Muslim family in Beirut on 20 December 1929. His father died when he was 7 months old. In 1941, he fled with his mother and grandmother from Beirut to Sawfar. He received his undergraduate degree in economics from the American University of Beirut and a PhD in business and economics from Indiana University in the United States in 1961.

Al-Huss was married to Leila Pharaoun, a Maronite Christian who converted to Islam at the end of her life in order to be buried next to her husband in a Muslim cemetery, according to a 2000 interview with al-Huss.

== Political career ==
Al-Huss served as prime minister of Lebanon four times. The first time was from 1976 until 1980 during the first years of the Lebanese Civil War. His second, and most controversial term, was from 1987 until 1989, when in 1988 he unconstitutionally nominated himself as prime minister but was recognized by many nations and statesmen of the international community. Al-Huss was chosen a third time to serve as prime minister by President Elias Hrawi from November 1989 until December 1990. He served as prime minister again from December 1998 to October 2000.

During his political career, he served as Lebanon's foreign minister, industry minister, education minister, labor minister, information minister, and economy minister.

He was a member of the anti-imperialist conference Axis for Peace. Al-Huss was a strong opponent of capital punishment, and during his term as prime minister he refused to sign any execution warrants, temporarily halting executions in Lebanon, which have remained rare.

=== First premiership ===
Al-Huss was appointed prime minister by President Elias Sarkis in December 1976. His government was formed amidst the ongoing civil war, which began in 1975 and involved various factions, including Palestinian groups, Christian militias, and Syrian forces. Despite his efforts to restore peace, al-Huss faced significant challenges, including renewed fighting between militias and the Syrian army, as well as the Israeli invasion in 1978. The internal political situation deteriorated, leading to his resignation on 20 July 1980, as he was unable to manage the ongoing violence and instability effectively. He was succeeded by Takieddin as-Solh.

=== Rival governments ===
From January to September 1988, he boycotted meetings of his own cabinet, in protest against the policies of President Amine Gemayel. On 22 September, he refused to accept his dismissal in favour of General Michel Aoun, a Maronite Christian. The crisis was precipitated by the failure of the National Assembly to elect a new president (in Lebanon, the president by convention is a Maronite Christian, while the Prime Minister by convention is a Sunni Muslim).

Since the Lebanese constitution states that in the event of a presidential vacancy, the outgoing president appoint a temporary prime minister to act as president, outgoing president Gemayel decided to appoint Maronite army commander Michel Aoun to that office, notwithstanding the tradition of reserving the post for a Sunni Muslim. al-Huss refused to concede the prime minister's post to Aoun, so the two ended up heading rival administrations; with Aoun occupying the presidential palace in East Beirut, al-Huss established his own office in West Beirut.

Lebanon was thus left with no president and two rival governments: one constitutional and the other recognized by many states. However, although Syria, at the time occupying much of Lebanon, supported al-Huss, and although al-Huss's cabinet was already operational, most of the international community dealt with administrations on both sides of the Green Line and recognized both as Lebanon's prime ministers even though, constitutionally speaking, Aoun was the lawfully appointed prime minister and acting president of Lebanon.

Violent conflict between the two prime ministers soon arose over Aoun's refusal to accept the presence of Syrian troops in Lebanon. In competition with Aoun, al-Huss remained acting president from 1988 until 5 November 1989, when René Moawad took office. When Moawad was assassinated seventeen days later, al-Huss reprised his role as acting president for two days, at which point Elias Hrawi was elected to succeed Moawad.

In 1990, the civil war ended when Aoun was forced to surrender following an attack on the presidential palace by Syrian and Lebanese military forces. Al-Huss subsequently resigned as prime minister, in favour of Omar Karami.

=== Final premiership ===
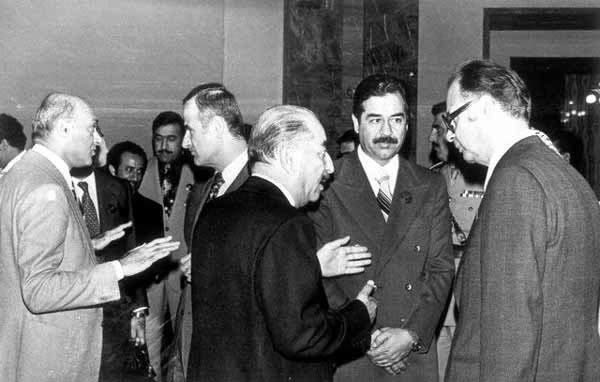
Salim al-Huss (far right) next to Saddam Hussein in the Arab Summit, 1978

Al-Huss was appointed prime minister after General Émile Lahoud was elected president. His government was notable for excluding many of the traditional feudal leaders and warlords who had dominated Lebanese politics. This shift aimed to create a more technocratic and reform-oriented administration. After losing his parliamentary seat to a previously unknown candidate running with former prime minister Rafik Hariri in the general elections of 2000, al-Huss resigned as prime minister, declaring the end of his political career.

== Retirement and death ==
In March 2005, he was considered as a candidate to form a new government following the resignation of Omar Karami (Prime Minister again), but he reportedly refused to accept the position for health reasons; Najib Mikati was subsequently appointed. On 2 May 2017, aged 87, al-Huss took part in a one-day hunger strike in a show of solidarity with the ongoing hunger strike of some 1,500 Palestinian prisoners held captive in Israel.

Al-Huss died on 25 August 2024 at the age of 94.

== Works ==
- Hoss, Salim (1974). "The Development of Lebanon's Financial Markets" – via Folios Ltd.
- Ḥuṣṣ, Salīm (1981). نافذة على المستقبل ؛ محاضرات وبحوث في القضية اللبنانية [Window on the Future] (in Arabic). دار العلم للملايين،. Archived from the original on 26 August 2024.
- Lebanon: Agony & Peace. 1982 – via UMAM BIBLIO.
- لبنان على المفترق [Lebanon at the Crossroads] (in Arabic). 1984 – via Institute for Palestine Studies.
- نقاط على الحروف / سليم الحص [Dots on the Is] (in Arabic). 1987 – via Institute for Palestine Studies.
- حرب الضحايا على الضحايا [A War Among Victims] (in Arabic). المركز الإسلامي للإعلام و الإنماء. 1988 – via koha.birzeit.edu.
- Ḥuṣṣ, Salīm (1991). على طريق الجمهورية الجديدة: مواقف ووثائق [On the Road to a New Republic] (in Arabic). المركز الاسلامي للاعلام والانماء. Archived from the original on 26 August 2024.
- Ḥuṣṣ, Salīm (1991). عهد القرار والهوى: تجارب الحكم في حقبة الانقسام، ١٩٨٧-١٩٩٠ [The Epoch of Resolution and Whim] (in Arabic). دار العلم للملايين،. Archived from the original on 26 August 2024.
- Huss, Salim (1992). زمن الأمل والخيبة: تجارب الحكم ما بين 1976 و 1980 [A Time of Hope and Disappointment] (in Arabic). دار العلم للملايين.
- ذكريات وعبر [Reminiscences and Lessons] (in Arabic). 1994 – via Institute for Palestine Studies.
- Huss, Salim (2001). للحقيقة والتاريخ تجارب الحكم ما بين 1998 و2000 [For Fact and History] (in Arabic). شركة المطبوعات للتوزيع والنشر.
- Huss, Salim (2002). محطات وطنية وقومية [Nationalist Landmarks] (in Arabic). شركة المطبوعات للتوزيع والنشر. Archived from the original on 26 August 2024.
- Huss, Salim (2003). نحن والطائفية [Face-to-Face with Sectarianism] (in Arabic). شركة المطبوعات للتوزيع والنشر. Archived from the original on 26 August 2024.
- Huss, Salim (2004). عصارة العمر [Gist of a Lifetime] (in Arabic). شركة المطبوعات للتوزيع والنشر،. Archived from the original on 26 August 2024.
- Huss, Salim (2005). صوت بلا صدى [Sound without Echo] (in Arabic). شركة المطبوعات للتوزيع والنشر،. Archived from the original on 26 August 2024.
- سلاح الموقف [Stance as weapon]. 2006 – via koha.birzeit.edu.
- Huss, Salim (2008). في زمن الشدائد لبنانياً وعربياً [Epoch of Agonies] (in Arabic). شركة المطبوعات للتوزيع والنشر. ISBN 978-9953-88-215-4. Archived from the original on 26 August 2024.

Political offices
Preceded by Rashid Karami	Prime Minister of Lebanon; 1976–1980	Succeeded by Takieddin as-Solh
Preceded by Rashid Karami	Prime Minister of Lebanon; 1987–1990	Succeeded by Omar Karami
Preceded by Amine Gemayel	President of Lebanon; Acting; 1988–1989	Succeeded by René Moawad
Preceded by René Moawad	President of Lebanon; Acting; 1989	Succeeded by Elias Hrawi
Preceded by Rafiq al-Hariri	Prime Minister of Lebanon; 1998–2000	Succeeded by Rafiq al-Hariri
