= Murr =

Murr may refer to:

== Geography ==
- Murr (river), a river in Baden-Württemberg, Germany
- Murr, Baden-Württemberg, a municipality in the district of Ludwigsburg, Baden-Württemberg, Germany
- Rems-Murr-Kreis, a district (Kreis) in Baden-Württemberg, Germany
- MU-RR, ISO 3166-2 code of the Rivière du Rempart District, Mauritius

== Fiction ==
- representation of the purring sound of felids, e.g. in comics
- Tomcat Murr, protagonist of the novel The Life and Opinions of the Tomcat Murr, written by E. T. A. Hoffmann
- Tomcat Murr, character in the books about the adventures of hedgehog Mecki, mascot of the German television magazine Hörzu

== Economy ==
- Murr Television, marketed and widely known as MTV Lebanon, a Lebanese television station

== Science ==
- MURR, nuclear research reactor at the University of Missouri in Columbia, Missouri

== People with the surname ==
- Andrew Murr, member of the Texas House of Representatives from Kimble County
- Charles T. Murr, Roman Catholic priest and author
- Christoph Gottlieb von Murr (1733–1811), polymathic German scholar
- Elias Murr, born 1962, Lebanese politician, son of Michel Murr
- Gabriel Murr, Lebanese politician
- Heinz Murr (1919–1998), Hauptsturmführer in the Waffen SS during World War II
- James "Murr" Murray (born 1976), American comedian, television star and member of The Tenderloins
- Josef Murr (1864–1932), Austrian philologist and botanist
- May Murr (1929–2008), Lebanese historian, writer, poet, and political activist, sister of Michel Murr
- Michel Murr (1932–2021), Lebanese politician and businessman, father of Elias Murr, brother of May Murr
- Mohammad Al Murr, born 1960, Dubai short-story writer
- Naeem Murr, born 1965, British-Lebanese novelist
- Wilhelm Murr (1888–1945), German Nazi politician

== See also ==
- Myrrh
- Murre
