= Tueni =

The Tueni family is a prominent Christian Greek Orthodox Lebanese family. It is one of the original aristocratic “Seven Families” of Beirut, along with the Bustros, Fayad, Rebeiz, Sursock, Ferneini, Dagher and Trad families, who constituted the traditional high society of Beirut for a long time. Members of the Tueni family include:

- Gebran Tueni (1957–2005), Lebanese journalist, politician, Member of Parliament, assassinated
- Gebran Tueni (journalist) (died 1948), Lebanese journalist, founder of the newspapers Al Ahrar and An-Nahar
- Fawzi Tueni (1901 - 1977), Started the Tripoli Fire department with the French Captain Moriesse. He received two medals for "Istihkak Lebanese". One of the medals was delivered by the President of the Republic Emile Edde in 1936.
- Ghassan Tueni (1926–2012), Lebanese journalist, ambassador, politician, government minister, Member of Parliament
- Nadia Tueni (1935–1983), Lebanese Francophone poet and wife of Ghassan Tueni
- Nayla Tueni (born 1982), Lebanese journalist, politician and Member of Parliament, daughter of Gebran Tueni
- Khaled Tueni (born 1955), Lebanese financial consultant, founder of KTEC-CPA, chairman of the Audit Committee of the Orthodox Schools in Beirut, and board member of St. George University Medical Center
