= Nayla Tueni =

Lebanese journalist and politician

Nayla Tueni نايلة تويني
- Born: 31 August 1982 (age 43); Achrafieh, Beirut, Lebanon
- Education: Lebanese University
- Occupations: Journalist, Parliamentarian
- Term: 2009–2018
- Political party: Independent
- Spouse: Malek Maktabi (m. 2009)
- Children: 3
- Parent(s): Gebran Tueni; Mirna Murr
- Relatives: Ghassan Tueni (grandfather); Nadia Tueni (grandmother); Michel Murr (grandfather); Gebran Tueni (great-grandfather); Marwan Hamadeh (great uncle)

Nayla Tueni Maktabi (Arabic: نايلة تويني مكتبي) (born 31 August 1982) is a Lebanese journalist and politician. She was a member of the Lebanese Parliament for almost ten years (2009–2018), representing the district of Achrafieh. Tueni is the CEO of one of Lebanon's most famous newspapers, An-Nahar.

Tueni is a fourth generation journalist. An Nahar was established by her great-grandfather, Gebran Tueni, in 1933. Her grandfather, Ghassan Tueni, ran the newspaper for decades. She is heiress along with her siblings to the newspaper dynasty and currently a member of the Board and the Deputy General Manager of An Nahar. She is also a board trustee of the Mentor Arabia, a non-governmental regional organization that promotes drug prevention and raises awareness on various issues among Arab youth.

== Early life ==
Nayla Tueni was born in Achrafieh on 31 August 1982. Her family is a prominent Eastern Orthodox Christian clan in Lebanon. She pursued her primary education at Collège Louise Wegman and went to high school at Collège Notre-Dame de Nazareth in Achrafieh. In 2005, she obtained a bachelor of arts degree in journalism from the Lebanese University. Then she received a master's degree from the Jean Monet Faculty in Paris. In 2003, she worked as a trainee for An Nahar and then wrote in the Education and Youth section of the newspaper.

== Political views and March 14 alliance ==
Nayla Tueni is a secular Greek Orthodox Christian. At the time of her political campaign, she stood for belief in Christian preservation, as well as her stance against Hezbollah, brought her the support of conservative Christians of the Lebanese Forces and Kataeb party. However, she is also an advocate for secular reforms in the Lebanese sectarian system. In a report broadcast by Al Jazeera about the power struggle of Lebanon's Christian clans, Tueni stated in Arabic: "The current system means I only represent my sect. I would rather represent my country and not my sect and hope that one day Lebanese politics will not be based on sect".

Among the 48 points she has listed in her political platform are her opposition to the foreign occupation of Lebanon by Israel or Syria, the support of a free democratic Lebanon and political pluralism. She also wishes to see Lebanon remain aside from regional tensions and conflicts, which have turned it into a battlefield for the wars others fight against each other. Tueni also wants to see Lebanese prisoners released from Syrian jails. She supports the securing of borders to prevent arms smuggling, and equal rights for Lebanese women, from voting to participating in the Army.

== Post 2009 period ==
Prior to the election Nayla Tueni made a promise to the Lebanese Forces (LF) block that she would join their bloc. However, she has yet to make this concession, meaning so far LF currently do not have a representative in their heartland of Achrafieh. After the election in August 2009, Nayla married the Lebanese television presenter of the LBC program Ahmar bel Khat al-Arid, Malek Maktabi in a civil ceremony in Cyprus, since Lebanon does not recognize civil marriage within Lebanese territory. Tueni is an Orthodox Christian and Maktabi is a Shiite Muslim. Reactions to the pairing were mixed as interfaith marriage is still unpopular among many Lebanese, due to sectarian tensions still apparent in Lebanese society.
