= Evelyne Bustros =

Lebanese writer

Evelyne Bustros (Arabic: إفلين بسترس; April 15, 1878 – November 26, 1971) was a Lebanese writer. She published multiple books and articles in her lifetime.

== Biography ==
=== Early life and education ===
Bustros was born in Ottoman-occupied Beirut on April 15, 1878. She was the youngest child of Gerios Tueni and Katbé Sursock, after Zahié, Michel, Gabriel, Jean and Alfred.

She was a boarding student at the Dames de Nazareth and left in 1899 to Paris to stay with her brother Jean, a Supreme Porte diplomat. In 1900, she took painting classes in Paris and attended the Exposition Universelle held in the French capital.

=== Adult life ===
On October 9, 1904, she married Gabriel Bustros and a year later gave birth to her only child Fadi. She was dedicated to his education and oversaw his primary education with tutors at home. The vacations took place in the family estates in Egypt and Palestine.

To flee World War I, the Bustros and Tueni families moved to Egypt where Eveline started her career in literature in « Ebauche » and conducted research for a historical novel on the early years of Islam.

After spending a few months in Beirut, Eveline lived between 1919 and 1930 in Paris, which she described as the city of literature and arts. Her son pursued his studies there and the family's only trips to Lebanon in those years were mainly summer vacations spent in Aley and Souk el Gharb.

=== Career ===
She published « La main d'Allah » by Bossard (Paris 1926) and « Fredons » (Beirut 1929) in which she stressed dialogue and Islamic-Christian rapprochement.

She moved back permanently to Lebanon where she launched in 1931 a number of socio cultural initiatives, including the establishment of « Syriban » and the organization of the first « Salon de Peinture Libanaise » in the Lebanese Parliament.

She was elected president of the « Women Renaissance » in 1934 and held this role for 35 years, That same year, she was elected head of the "Société des Gens de Lettres" (Literature People Society).

During that period, she published several articles and translated works in the French-speaking Lebanese media namely "Phénicia". She also went on trips to discover local Arab traditions and customs.

She headed in 1938 the Lebanese delegation to the Conference of Arab Women Federations in Egypt.

In 1938 and 1939, she took part in organizing the Lebanese wing in the New York World Fair and contributed to George Cyr's oil paintings representing Lebanese traditions.

During World War II, she continued her activities in the feminist movement and held some of the most influential roles.

She presided in 1942 the « Arab Lebanese Women's Union » which grouped all thirty association recognized by the State. She held this role in rotation with Ibtihaj Kaddoura until 1946, then between 1949 and 1953.

On November 12, 1943, she and the feminist movement were at the forefront of the massive march for the independence of Lebanon.

In 1945, she became a founding member of the Lebanese Pen Club.

She headed the Lebanese delegation to the International Conference for Women in Haiderabad, India. The following year she issued in Cahiers de L'est Mission in India, her recollection of the Conference.

She finalized her second novel "Sous la baguette du Coudrier" in 1949 but postponed the publication.

On November 24, 1952, she held a conference entitled "Réminiscence" at the Lebanese Cenacle in which she was the first female member.

In 1953, she co-founded with Anissa Rawda Najjar the Association for Rural Development which opened scores of free schools in villages. She headed the Association for more than ten years.

In 1956 she published « Evocations », a booklet in memory of Michel Chiha.

In 1958, she published « Sous la Baguette du Coudrier » in Beirut (Imprimerie Catholique).

=== Later years and death ===
In 1971, a few months before her death, in a final get together at her place, she was granted the Lebanese gold medal of merit. The President of the Beirut Municipal Council Amin Beyhum discussed the Municipality's proposition to name the public garden just built in Ramlet el Baida after her. In 1973, the Lebanese Prime Minister and her old friend Takieddine el Solh ratified the decision.

On November 26, 1971, Eveline Bustros died in the house where she was born.
