= Mazen Abdul-Jawad =

Saudi Arabian man (born 1977)

- Born: 1977 (age 48–49); Saudi Arabia
- Occupation: Airline employee
- Status: In prison
- Conviction: Publicizing vice
- Penalty: 5 years and 1,000 lashes (October 2009)

Mazen Abdul-Jawad (born 1977) is a Saudi Arabian man who spoke about his sexual exploits on television in July 2009. He was convicted and sentenced to five years in prison and 1,000 lashes for talking publicly about sex. After the program by the Lebanese Broadcasting Corporation (LBC) which included his comments aired, the Saudi government shut down the LBC's two offices in the country.

== Television appearance ==
Abdul-Jawad was a sales clerk for Saudia and a divorced father of four when he appeared on the Lebanese Broadcasting Corporation satellite TV program Ahmar Bel Khat El Arid on July 15, 2009 and discussed his personal sexual exploits. On the show, Jawad talked about having sex at the age of 14 with a neighbor and picking up women using the Bluetooth on his cellphone (as they are forbidden to interact with men in public), and revealed a recipe for an aphrodisiac. The program also showed Abdul-Jawad leading viewers into his bedroom, dominated by red accessories, and showing off sex toys, which were blurred for viewing. Later, three male friends join him for a discussion on what turns them on.

== Arrest and conviction ==
Jawad was arrested on July 31 for publicising vice, after Saudi religious and judicial authorities received what they said were hundreds of complaints from the public regarding the program. A police spokesman in Jeddah said that Jawad's appearance had violated Saudi Arabia's Islamic Sharia law code and was against Saudi customs.

An anonymous source from the Saudi Prosecution and Investigation Commission (PIC) stated that the prosecution might request charging Jawad and the other defendants for Hirabah, a crime defined as "waging unlawful warfare (in speech or action) against the state and society". The punishment for such a crime would be beheading.

On October 7, 2009, Jawad was convicted by a Jeddah court on charges based on Sharia law. He was sentenced to five years imprisonment and 1,000 lashes. The sentence also includes a ban on travel and talking to the media for five years after his release.

The other three men on the show were also convicted of discussing sex publicly. They were sentenced to two years imprisonment and 300 lashes each. A cameraman who helped film the episode was sentenced to two months in jail. A female journalist at LBC, one of two arrested, was sentenced to 60 lashes.

== Statements ==
Jawad's lawyer, Sulaiman al-Jumeii, said the case should not be considered closed, and that he planned to appeal the court's ruling, claiming that the decision was made "under pressure from public opinion". He maintained that Jawad was not referring to his own sexual experiences and that the toys shown on the program were not his own. He further argued that the case was tried before the wrong court, and that it should have been heard by a specialized court at the Information Ministry qualified to issue decisions regarding technical issues related to the case.

Al-Jumeii filed a lawsuit against LBC, maintaining that his client was duped by the media corporation and was unaware in many cases he was being recorded.

== Other ==
On August 7, YouTube disabled comments for the video clip of the program. Before the clip was blocked by the government censor in Saudi Arabia, it was viewed more than 430,000 times.
