= Malek Maktabi =

Lebanese television presenter (born 1981)

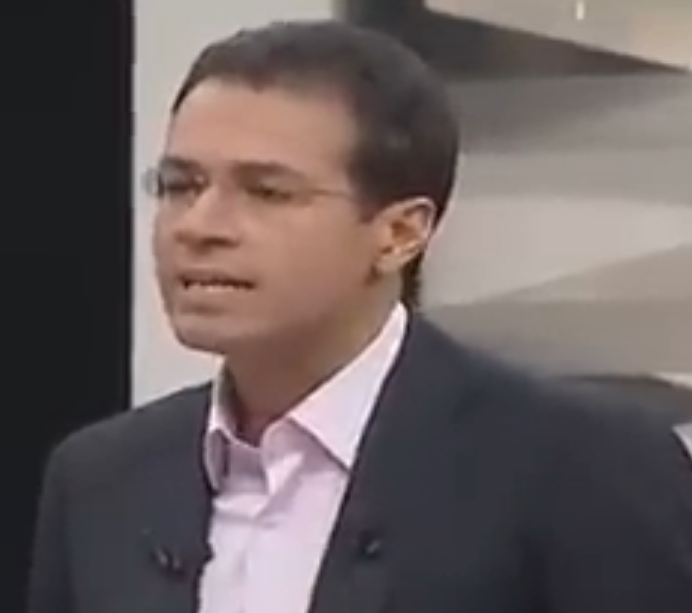
- Born: Malek Maktabi; 10 November 1981 (age 44); Beirut, Lebanon
- Occupation: News presenter
- Notable credit: Ahmar Bil Khat Al Arid
- Spouse: Nayla Tueni (m. 2009)
- Children: 3

Malek Maktabi (or Malik Maktaby, Arabic: مالك مكتبي, born in Beirut on 28 December 1981) is a Lebanese television presenter who is known for hosting Ahmar Bil Khatt Al Aarid (Red in Boldface), a weekly talk show about social and human issues, which runs on the Lebanese Broadcasting Corporation (LBC) TV network.

== Personal life ==
Maktabi married politician and newspaper heiress Nayla Tueni, daughter of assassinated Gebran Tueni, in August 2009, in a civil ceremony in Cyprus.

They have three children together. Their eldest son Gebran Malek Maktabi (born 2010) followed by their second son Sharif Malek Maktabi (born 2013) and their first daughter and youngest child Noor (born 2015).

== Career ==
Maktabi has a Ph.D in international affairs and diplomacy, completed in London.
