= Hicham Haddad =

Lebanese comedian and TV show host

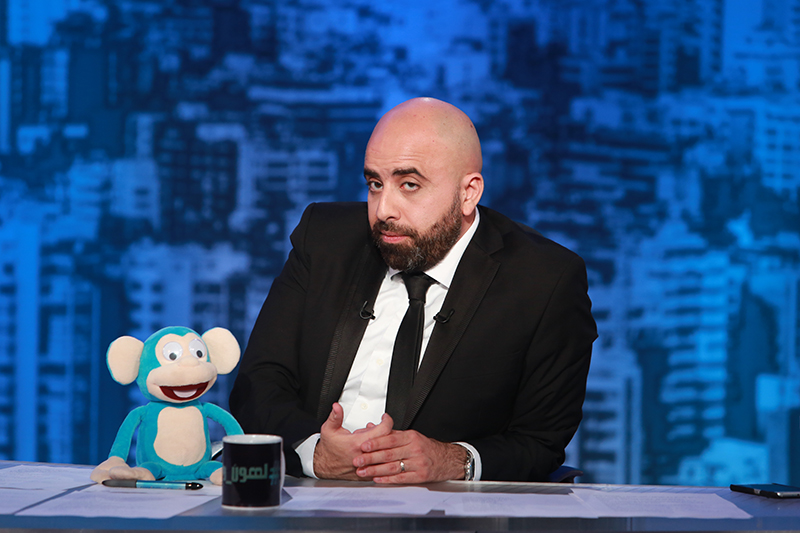
- Lahonwbas show
- Born: Beirut, Lebanon
- Education: Business management
- Occupations: Actor, presenter
- Television: OTV (Lebanon), LBCI, MTV (Lebanon)
- Spouse: Nathalie Zarka (m:2012; div:2024)
- Children: 2

Hicham Haddad (Arabic: هشام حداد) is a Lebanese comedian, actor, and TV show host, currently presenting the show Ktir Hal2ad.

== Early life and education ==
Hicham Haddad was born in Beirut, Lebanon.

He studied the Business Administration at Saint Joseph University, and since 1999 he owned a medical machines sales company.

== Career ==
In 2008, Haddad's friend, director Shadi Hanna, offered him a role in presenting the program "Ovrira" on OTV. Later he began presenting the satirical comedy program "LOL" with his colleague Arze Chidiac, which achieved a great success in Lebanon and Syria. From 2012 until 2015 he presented a talk show with his brother Maher entitled "Hartakji", when he left OTV to join LBCI, which had appointed him to present Lahonwbas, a comedy entertainment program.

== Personal life ==
He married Natalie Zarqa in 2012 and divorce in 2024 and they have 2 sons.

He was a follower of the Free Patriotic Movement from 1996, but later left the party.

== Controversy ==
In April 2016, he mocked in his program "Lahonwbas" the Emirati singer Ahlam, while presenting a cow in his studio.

In January 2018, the Lebanese authorities filed a lawsuit against him based on a memorandum of Justice Minister Salim Jreissati, accusing him of insulting Saudi Crown Prince Muhammad bin Salman following an episode of the same program.

== Work ==
- 2008: Ovrira (TV Show)
- 2009-2011: Theatrical Plays with Arze Chidiac
- 2009-2011: LOL (TV Show)
- 2011: Cash Flow 1 (Film)
- 2012-2014: Hartakji (TV Show)
- 2014: Samir and Michel (Play)
- 2015–2022: Lahonwbas (TV Show)
- 2016: Cash Flow 2 (Film)
- 2016: In the Blink of an Eye (Film)
- 2017: Laugh story (Play)
- 2018: Tahsil Hasil (TV Show)
- 2018: Caramel Bean (Film)
- 2018: Khamse W Khamsieh (TV Series)
- 2019: Lahon W Habs (Film)
- 2020: Rahit Alayna (TV Show)
- 2020: Hisham Beik (TV Show)
- 2020: Yom Eh Yom La2 (Film)
- 2023: Ktir Hal2ad (TV Show)

== Awards ==
- United Arab Emirates: 2017, Best Arab TV Presenter by "Zahrat Al Khaleej" Magazine.
- Lebanon: 2018, Biaf Festival, for the "Lahounwbas" program.
