= Marwan Hamadeh =

Lebanese journalist and politician (born 1939)

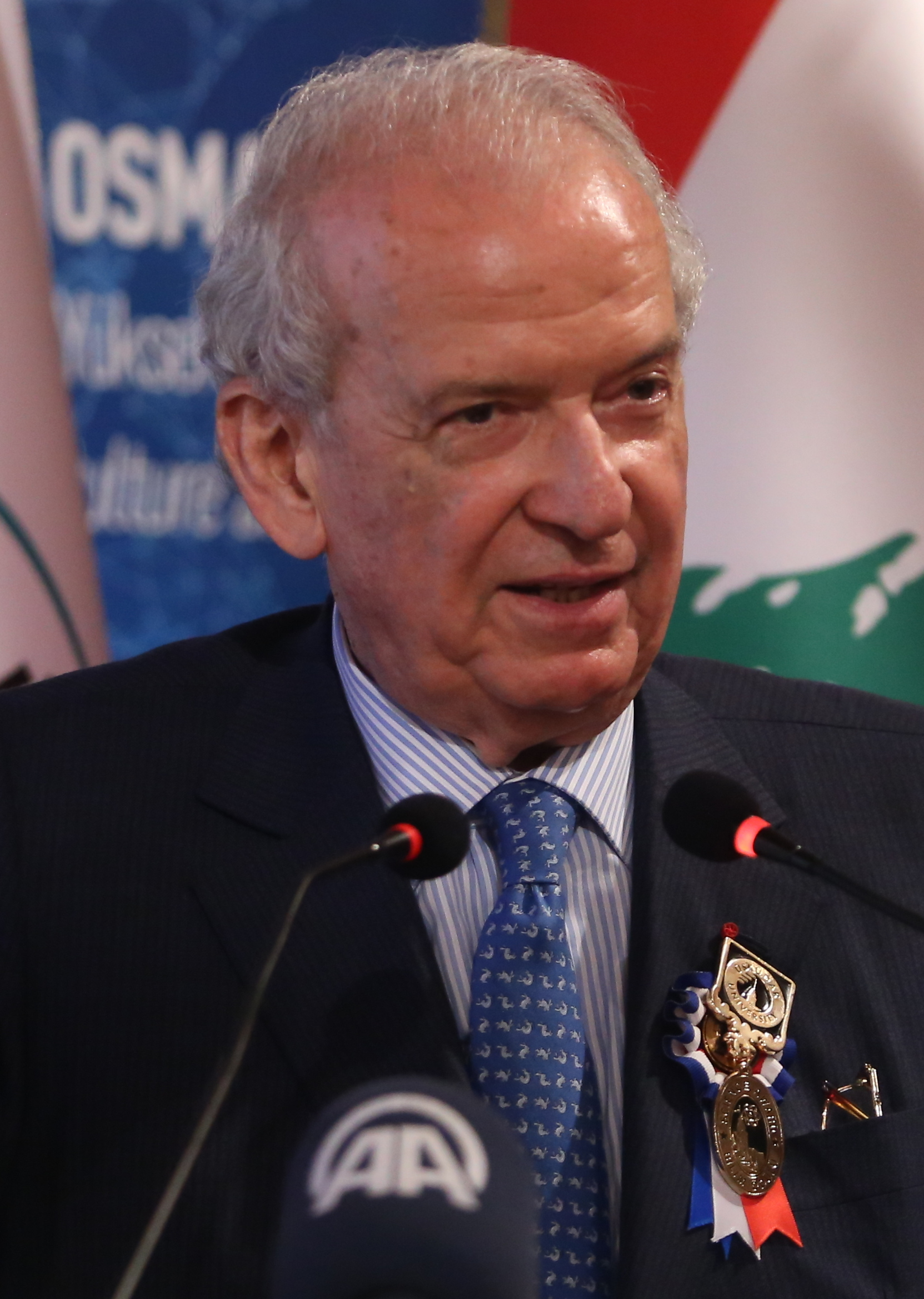
- Hamadeh in 2018

Minister of Education and Higher Education
- In office 18 December 2016 – 31 January 2019
- Prime Minister: Saad Hariri
- Preceded by: Elias Bou Saab
- Succeeded by: Akram Chehayeb

Minister of Telecommunications
- In office 19 July 2005 – 11 July 2008
- Prime Minister: Fouad Siniora
- Preceded by: Alan Tabourian
- Succeeded by: Gebran Bassil

Minister of Economy and Trade
- In office 2003 – September 2004
- Prime Minister: Rafik Hariri
- Preceded by: Bassel Fleihan
- Succeeded by: Fouad Siniora (acting); Adnan Kassar

Minister for the Displaced
- In office October 2000 – 2003
- Prime Minister: Rafik Hariri

Personal details
- Born: Marwan Mohammad Ali Hamadeh; 11 September 1939 (age 87) Baakleen, Lebanon
- Party: Progressive Socialist Party
- Spouse: Vanda Barakat
- Children: 2
- Relatives: Nadia Tueni (sister); Ali Hamade (brother); Gebran Tueni (nephew)
- Education: Saint Joseph University

Marwan Hamadeh (Arabic: مروان حمادة; born 11 September 1939) is a Lebanese journalist and politician, who served in various capacities in different cabinets, including minister of education, minister of telecommunications, minister of economy and trade, minister of tourism, minister of health and minister for the displaced. He served as a member of the Lebanese parliament until his resignation, on 5 August 2020, after the explosions in Beirut claiming that the government was "ineffective" to handle the incident.

== Early life and education ==
Marwan Hamadeh, also written as Marouan Hamadé (preferred French transliteration), was born into a Druze family in Baakleen, Chouf district, on 11 September 1939. His brother, Ali Hamadeh, is a journalist who was a member of Saad Hariri's political party and is married to Nadine Jabbour Hamade. His sister, Nadia Tueni, a notable author and French poet, was married to Ghassan Tueni, former UN ambassador and senior editor of the Lebanese daily, An Nahar. Their son, and Hamadeh's nephew, Gebran Tueni, was assassinated in a car bombing in Beirut in December 2005.

Hamadeh holds a law degree, which he earned from Saint Joseph University in 1963. He received a PhD in economy from the same university.

== Career and views ==
Hamadeh started his career as an economic and political editor for An Nahar, L'Orient le Jour and Le Point in 1964 and continued to work for these papers until 1975. He was appointed tourism minister in 1982, and his term lasted for two years. He served as economy minister in the cabinet led by Prime Minister Omar Karami, replacing Nazih Al Bizri in the post. Hamadeh's term lasted from 24 December 1990 to 15 May 1992, and he was succeeded by Samir Makdasi. From 1992 to 1996 he served as minister of health and social affairs in the first cabinet of Rafik Hariri. In the general elections of 1996 he won a seat from Chouf.

In October 2000, Hamadeh was appointed minister for the displaced to the cabinet led by Rafik Hariri. Then he was appointed economy minister in cabinet reshuffle in 2003, replacing Bassel Fleihan. Hamadeh was one of three ministers in the cabinet, who were members of the Progressive Socialist Party led by Walid Jumblatt. During this period, Hamadeh was one of the close advisors to Jumblatt.

Hamadeh was one of four members of the Lebanese Parliament who voted against the extension of president Lahoud's term in office in September 2004. Hamadeh, formerly one of Syria's staunchest allies in Lebanon, became a critic of the Syrian occupation of Lebanon after the Resolution 1559 was passed in 2005. Hamadeh and the same three other cabinet members, namely culture minister Ghazi Aridi, environment minister Farès Boueiz and refugee affairs minister Abdullah Farhat, also resigned from office on 7 September 2004 in protest at the constitutional amendment that allowed the three-year extension of then President Émile Lahoud's term. Finance Minister Fouad Siniora replaced Hamadeh as acting economy minister. From 19 July 2005 to 11 July 2008 Hamadeh served as minister of telecommunications.

In the general elections of 2009, Hamadeh won a seat from the Chouf district.

=== Assassination attempt ===
Hamadeh was injured in a car bomb explosion in west Beirut on 1 October 2004 that killed his bodyguard and injured his driver. The blast is considered to have been the beginning of series of assassinations by Unit 121 of Lebanese politicians and journalists, mostly anti-Hezbollah and anti-Syrian figures. Then Syrian vice president Abdul Halim Khaddam visited Hamadeh at the American University of Beirut Medical Center after the attack.

== Personal life ==
Hamadeh was married twice. From his earlier wife he has two children : Karim Hamadeh and Rania Hamadeh Gemayel. From his daughter Rania, Hamadeh has two grandchildren. Hamadeh is a Druze.

Political offices
Preceded by Alan Tabourian	Minister of Telecommunications (Lebanon); 2005-2008	Succeeded by Gebran Bassil
