= Ahmar Bel Khat El Arid =

- Genre: Social
- Presented by: Malek Maktabi
- Country of origin: Lebanon

Production
- Executive producer: Mazen Laham
- Running time: 60 minutes

Original release
- Network: Lebanese Broadcasting Corporation
- Release: March 19, 2008 – present

Ahmar Bel Khat Al Areed ("In Red Boldface", Arabic: أحمر بالخط العريض) is a talk show that discusses a variety of controversial social and human issues airing on the Lebanese Broadcasting Corporation, a privately owned television station in Lebanon. The flagship show which premiered on March 19, 2008, has become a weekly rendezvous for its vast audience. It approaches taboos and controversies, through conversations with people who have gone through these experiences. The weekly program airs every Wednesday at 9.30 KSA. It brings together guests from Lebanon and the Arab world sharing their testimonies with famous host Malek Maktabi who in turn highlights solutions with experts from different fields.

== Criticism ==
Ahmar Bel Khat Al Arid has been criticized by Arab conservatives to surface issues that are not to be made public according to traditional Arab beliefs. Mazen Abdul-Jawad, a Saudi Arabian man, was sentenced to 5 years of prison and 1,000 lashes on charges related to immoral behavior. During an episode discussing “sexual pleasure”, Mazen spoke about picking up women and displayed his vast collection of sex toys on camera. This episode became highly polemic in the Arab World, forcing the Saudi Arabian government to shut down LBC offices in the Kingdom.

Malek Maktabi also tackled the question “Is he your biological father?” during one of the episodes. This episode caused a shock in Arab societies. During the show, the guests waited impatiently to finally know the truth about their parentage. Andre M'Karbane, a professor in genetic diseases, declared the results which were analyzed several times to reach an accurate answer.
