= Hôpital d'instruction des armées Percy =

- French Defence Health service
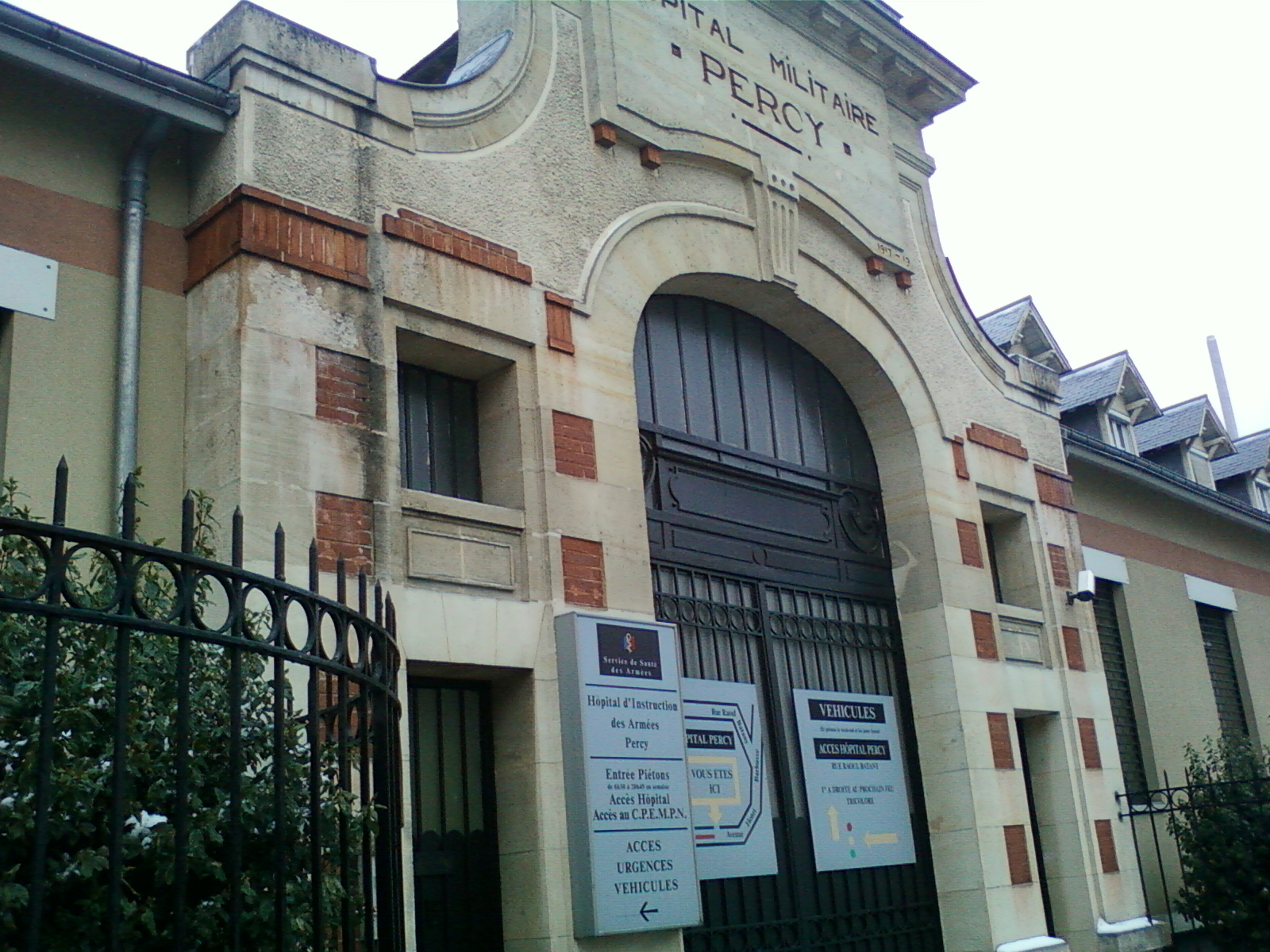

Geography
- Location: Clamart, France
- Coordinates: 48.8142°N 2.25583°E

Organisation
- Type: Military hospital

Links
- Website: www.defense.gouv.fr/sites/sante/hopital_dinstruction_des_armees_percy/
- Lists: Hospitals in France

The Hôpital d'instruction des armées Percy (lit. "Percy Training Hospital of the Armies"; HIA Percy) is a military hospital in Clamart, near Paris, France. It is managed by the French Armed Forces Health Service and provides health services to both military and civilian patients. It is named after Pierre-François Percy, military surgeon during the Napoleonic wars.

The hospital has, in particular, an emergency service, a service for treating severe burns, and a service for treating patients contaminated by radioactivity (including a hematological service).

== Notable patients ==
The hospital has treated several heads of state and other notable individuals.

Palestinian leader Yasser Arafat was treated at Percy hospital from October 29, 2004, until his death on November 11, 2004. During his stay at Percy, he had fallen into an increasingly deeper coma despite intensive care.

Bassel Fleihan, a Lebanese legislator and Minister of Economy and Commerce was treated at Percy, having suffered major burns on 95% of his body when a massive bomb exploded on the Beirut seafront as he passed by in former Lebanese Prime Minister Rafik al-Hariri's motorcade on February 14, 2005. Despite being seated beside Hariri, who was killed when the explosion occurred, Fleihan lived through the attack and was airlifted to Percy where he survived for 64 days before succumbing to his injuries.

Zambian president Levy Mwanawasa was admitted to hospital 1 July 2008 to receive treatment following a stroke he suffered on 29 June. He died in hospital on 19 August 2008.
