= Bassel Fleihan =

Lebanese legislator (1963–2005)

Bassel Fuleihan
- Born: 10 September 1963; Beirut, Lebanon
- Died: 18 April 2005 (aged 41); Clamart, France
- Cause of death: Assassination
- Resting place: Tohwita, Beirut
- Education: American University of Beirut; Yale University; Columbia University
- Occupation: Economist
- Years active: 1988–2005
- Spouse: Yasma Fuleihan

Bassel Fleihan (10 September 1963 – 18 April 2005; Arabic: باسل فليحان) was a Lebanese legislator and Minister of Economy and Trade. He died from injuries sustained when a massive bomb exploded on the Beirut seafront as he passed by in former Lebanese prime minister Rafik Hariri's motorcade on 14 February 2005. The Special Tribunal for Lebanon convicted several Hezbollah members for their role in the bombing, which is widely believed to have been orchestrated by the Syrian government.

== Early years and education ==
Fleihan was born in Beirut on 10 September 1963. He attended the International College, a non-profit private school in Beirut. He received a bachelor of arts degree in economics from the American University of Beirut (AUB) in 1984. Then he obtained a master of arts degree in international and development economics from Yale University in 1985. He also held a PhD in economics from Columbia University in 1990. His PhD dissertation was entitled “Customs Unions, Growth and Economic Diversification”.

== Career ==
From 1988 to 1993, Fleihan worked at the International Monetary Fund in Washington, D.C.. He worked there as an advisor and then senior advisor to the Saudi executive director. He also worked at the United Nations Development Programme. In 1993, he left his job and returned to Lebanon, where he had been asked to assist in the post-war rehabilitation of the ministry of finance. While working as an adviser at the ministry, from 1993 to 1999, Fleihan also taught economics at his old alma mater, the American University of Beirut (AUB).

Fleihan was first elected to the Parliament of Lebanon in 2000, winning the Protestant seat in Beirut's first electoral district and becoming the only Protestant member of the Parliament. He ran as a member of Hariri's "Dignity of Beirut" electoral list. In October 2000, he was appointed minister of economy and trade to the cabinet led by then prime minister Rafik Hariri. He held this position until 2003, and was replaced by Marwan Hamadeh.

Fleihan played a role in the development of Lebanon's economic reform program, which was presented by Hariri to international donors at a Paris conference in November 2002. Donors pledged $4.3 billion in soft loans; the plan was never fully implemented, but Lebanon did ultimately receive $2.39 billion from the donors.

== Personal life ==
Fleihan was a Protestant and a member of the National Evangelical Church of Beirut. Fleihan is survived by his wife, Yasma Fleihan, their children, Rayna (born 1999) and Rayan (born 2001), and his brother Ramsay and his family. At a service on February 24, 2005, Mohamad Chatah shared the following anecdote:

"If you want to really know about Basil’s love, you should ask his wife Yasma. As many of you know, Yasma and his two little children had been living in Switzerland since last fall, because he feared for their safety as he told his friends. He would go and visit them every time he could. In fact he had returned to Beirut from Switzerland just a day before that awful Monday. He returned because of what he considered to be important parliamentary duties, despite the fact that the following day, February 14, was a very special day. Monday morning, while inside the parliament building debating the electoral law, he kept calling his office to make sure that the Valentine Day flowers he had requested would be delivered to his wife."

In 2013, both of Fleihan's children composed poems in his memory.

== Death and funeral ==
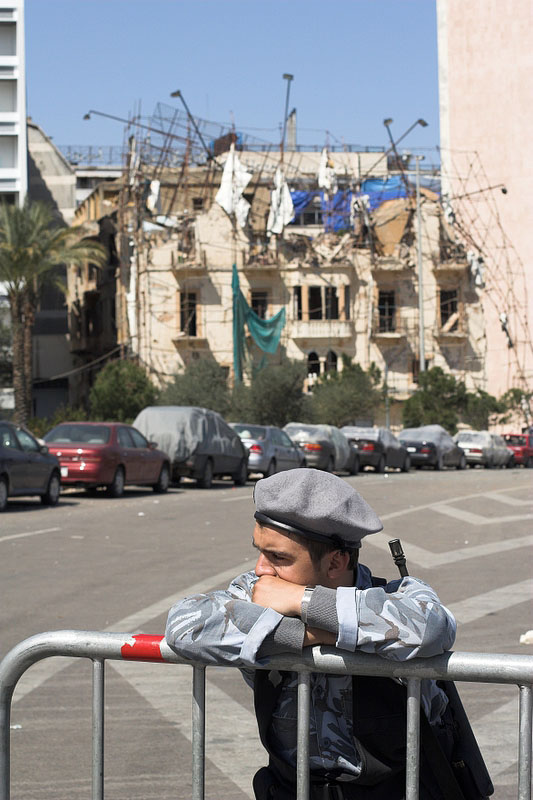
A Lebanese Internal Security Forces officer guarding the site of the bombing

The day before the Hariri assassination, Fleihan was in Geneva, Switzerland. Although his wife had tried to convince him to extend his stay in Europe, Fleihan insisted on returning to Lebanon for an extraordinary Parliamentary session scheduled for 14 February 2005. After the session, Fleihan joined Hariri in his motorcade to head back to the latter's mansion in West Beirut. About half-way through their journey, a one-ton truck bomb exploded as they passed through the city's upscale seafront hotel district. At least a dozen people—including Hariri and several of his bodyguards—were killed instantly; the final death toll rose to 21.

Despite being seated beside Hariri when the explosion occurred, Fleihan lived through the attack. However, severe burns covered over 95% of his body. Fleihan was first taken to the intensive care unit of the American University Hospital. Then he was airlifted to Percy Military Hospital in Clamart (suburb of Paris), where he survived for 64 days before finally succumbing to his injuries. He died on 18 April 2005. Fleihan's body was taken to Lebanon and funeral service was held at a Protestant church in Beirut. He was buried in Tohwita, a suburb of Beirut, on 22 April. A website was created to

A United Nations investigation of the incident by Detlev Mehlis, released in October 2005, pointed the finger at Syrian officials. Bashar al-Assad is widely regarded to have directly ordered the assassination. In 2020, the UN-authorized Special Tribunal for Lebanon convicted Hezbollah military officer Salam Ayyash in absentia for playing a "central role" in the 2005 bombing. The Tribunal found two more Hezbollah members guilty of being accomplices in the assassination in 2022. The court did not find evidence implicating Hezbollah's leaders, and the group denies responsibility.

== Legacy ==
Fuleihan's family established Basil Fuleihan Foundation in Lebanon after his death. The aim of the foundation is stated to be the provision of the basis for tomorrow’s Lebanon by promoting improvements in public policy and public service. In February 2006, the finance institute at Lebanese finance ministry was named the "Bassel Fleihan finance and economy institute", which Fleihan actively contributed its foundation in 1996.

== See also ==
- List of assassinated Lebanese politicians
- Assassination of Mohamad Chatah
