= Whispers (1980 film) =

Lebanese film

- Directed by: Maroun Bagdadi
- Written by: Maroun Bagdadi
- Starring: Nadia Tueni
- Release date: 1980
- Running time: 93 minutes
- Country: Lebanon
- Language: Arabic

Whispers (French: Murmures; Arabic: همسات) is a 1980 Lebanese documentary film directed by Maroun Bagdadi. The film follows poet Nadia Tueni and photographer Nabil Ismail as they journey through war torn Lebanon.

== Summary ==
Bagdadi follows Tueni as she travels from Akkar to Tyre rediscovering Lebanon after the first five years of the Lebanese Civil War. Tueni and Bagdadi interview various notable Lebanese figures such as Joseph Khoury (bishop of Tyre), Michel Alouf, the former owner of Hotel Palmyra (Baalbek), the businessman and politician Henri Pharaon, and musician and songwriter Ziad Rahbani.

== Cast ==
- Nadia Tueni as herself
- Nabil Ismail as himself
- Ziad Rahbani as himself

== Release ==
The film was released on Netflix alongside other Lebanese films in the aftermath of the 2020 Beirut port explosion.

== See also ==
- List of Lebanese films
