= Albert Kostanian =

Lebanese politician

Albert Kostanian (born 1980) is a Lebanese economist and journalist of Armenian descent.

== Personal life ==
Born in Tyre, he studied economics at the Saint Joseph University in Beirut and completed his studies at HEC University in Paris. He spent most of his career in Paris in the strategy consulting industry and returned permanently to Lebanon in 2015.

== Family life ==
He is married to Maguy Khoubbieh and has three kids, Camille, Emmanuelle and Noa.

== Politics ==
He was one of the founders of the Loubnanouna movement.

After the assassination of MP Pierre Amin Gemayel, he was among the companions and classmates of Sami Gemayel, his brother, who joined the party in 2007.

In 2009 he took over the management of the Kataeb electoral machine. He moved between Lebanon and Paris, where he worked as a strategic advisor at Arthur D. Little, until he founded the Beirut office in the company in 2014. He distanced himself from Kataeb Party in 2015 and quit all his official positions in the Party in 2017.

Since 2019, he presents “vision 2030”, a prime-time TV show on LBCI. He was elected in 2021 as chairman of the pressure group Kulluna Irada active in promoting reforms in Lebanon. He is also a senior fellow for Economics at the Issam Fares Institute at the American University of Beirut. He published in 2021 a report on the privatization of Lebanon Public Assets.

== Television work ==
On March 26, 2019, he launched a television show called Vision 2030 in which he hosted guests in various political, cultural, and economic arenas. on the Lebanese Broadcasting Corporation. The show is praised for its calm and constructive tone, and the depth of discussions that differentiate it from traditional TV shows and has witnessed an important success since its launch.
