= Fernaine =

Greek Orthodox Christian Lebanese family

The Fernaine family (also spelled as Fernainé, Ferneineh, Ferneini and Fernainy; Arabic: فرنيني) is a prominent Antiochian Greek-Orthodox Christian Lebanese family. It is one of the original Beirut aristocratic "Seven Families" along with the Bustros, Rebeiz, Dagher, Fayad, Sursock, Trad, and Tueni families, who constituted the traditional high society of Beirut for a long time. Estate holders and feudal lords by origin, today they are business owners, physicians, artists, and philanthropists in Lebanon and abroad.

The land formerly owned by the Ferneini family, along with the rest of the Seven Families, was concentrated in the district of Beirut known as Achrafieh. Under the French Mandate, the land was partitioned to build roads and highways during the 1930s, and eventually, the families were forced to sell vast amounts of their land.

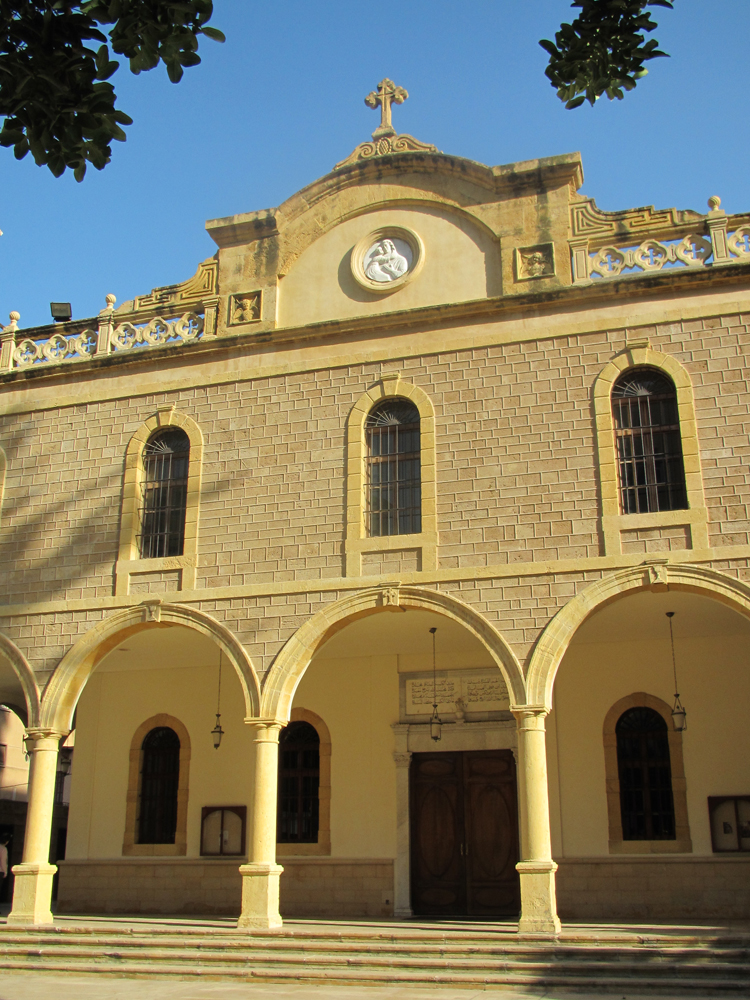
The Annunciation Church in Achrafieh, Beirut

The Greek Orthodox Annunciation Church ( Arabic: سيدة البشارة للروم الأرثوذكس, romanized: Sayyidat al-Bashāra li-l-Rūm al-Urthūdhuks; French: église de l'Annonciation) in Achrafieh was built by Negib Ferneini in 1927. Negib had emigrated to Egypt during World War I, and upon his return he offered a piece of his land to have the church built. Rue Fernaine in Achrafieh is named after him and Fouad Fernaine.
