= Dany Bustros =

Lebanese belly dancer (1959–1998)

- داني بسترس
- Born: 8 October 1959; Beirut, Lebanon
- Died: 27 December 1998 (aged 39); Lebanon
- Cause of death: Suicide by gunshot
- Occupations: Socialite, bellydancer
- Years active: 1990s
- Children: 1
- Relatives: Bustros family

Dany Bustros (Arabic: داني بسترس, 8 October 1959 – 27 December 1998) was a Lebanese belly dancer, socialite and stage actress. She was a member of the Bustros family, an aristocratic Beiruti family. At the height of her career she was considered to be "Lebanon's Leading Belly dancer" who had successfully combined traditional dance with western dance forms such as Flamenco and modern.

== Biography ==
=== Origins ===
Dany Bustros was born on 8 October 1959 in Beirut, to the prominent Bustros family, one of the seven original Beirut aristocratic families that constituted the traditional high-society of Beirut. The Bustros family were originally estate holders and feudal lords, they later became business owners, artists and land owners throughout Lebanon.

=== Career ===
Bustros achieved acclaim for her dance revue "Boulevard de la Cité" in 1991. In 1993 she made her acting debut in the French play "Encore une minute" (One more minute). Two years later, she starred in a musical alongside Lebanese singer-composer Melhem Barakat.

== Personal tragedy and later suicide ==
In 1994, Bustros witnessed the drowning of her 16-year-old son George. She attempted suicide twice before her death in 1998. In the weeks leading up to her death, a close friend of the entertainer frequently saw her at church. When asked what was wrong, Bustros replied, "I need God".

=== Death ===
Bustros died in December 1998 at her home in Adma. The cause of death was suicide by firearm.

== Cultural impact ==
In 2017, Lebanese singer Elissa released a music video that depicted the life of Dany Bustros. It was directed by Angy Jammal. The song's title "Aaks Elli Shayfenha", which translates to "The opposite of what you see", is supposed to shed light on depression and mental health issues.
