= Pierre El Daher =

Lebanese businessman (born 1957)

Pierre El Daher بيار الضاهر
- Born: 4 October 1957 (age 68); Lebanon
- Education: University of Southern California (BS and MS in industrial engineering)
- Occupations: Chairman & CEO of LBCI

Pierre Youssef El Daher (Arabic: بيار يوسف الضاهر, born 4 October 1957) is a Lebanese businessman and the CEO of the Lebanese Broadcasting Corporation International (LBCI) television.

== Business life ==
El Daher began his career as a businessman by founding Lebanese Broadcasting Corporation International (LBCI) alongside other shareholders in 1985. LBCI would go on to air across the Arab World, European Union, United States, Canada, Americas and Australia as part of its satellite station LBC SAT.

After the success of LBCI in 1997 El Daher launched production house PAC ltd, which was created to become an in-house production laboratory, and remained chairman and CEO until 2011. By the end of 2008, it was decided to increase the capital by a large margin. Accordingly, Al Waleed Bin Talal became the largest shareholder as he won the absolute majority in PAC and LBC SAT provided that the increase in capital would be invested to improve the programs network and upgrade productivity. In 2010, Rupert Murdoch joined the group and thus PAC and LBC SAT; however, the cooperation did not improve and develop the group. PAC was liquidated in 2012.

After long battles before international arbitration courts, he managed to win the lawsuits against Saudi Prince Al-Waleed Bin Talal. A lawsuit was finalized in February 2019, when ICC International Court of Arbitration in Paris issued an award in which the companies owned and controlled by Al Waleed Bin Talal lost the arbitrary proceedings filed against Pierre El Daher in person. The subject of the lawsuit is related to claims filed by several Rotana companies pursuant to the services agreement entered into on 22 February 2011 between Pierre El Daher and Rotana TV Company Ltd.

As chairman of LBCI, El Daher placed emphasis on research in the media field and to educate students. El Daher was named one of the Top 100 Most Powerful Arabs 2007 by Arabian Business. As CEO of LBCI, El Daher's activities include: Global Media AIDS Initiative at the UN headquarters, raising awareness and fighting AIDS, Rebuilding with Harris Corp. Iraq's media network, a project approved by the US administration in 2004, cooperating with UNICEF to highlight the children's voices via a series launched on LBCI named Sawtna, advising schools on matters related to the Communication and Information Studies program. Pierre also launched "Cheyef 7alak" initiative, a civic movement with an ultimate goal of raising civil and social awareness, that is based on citizen journalism. It gives Lebanese citizen the power to report irresponsible and dangerous behaviors for a better Lebanon.

In March 2021, the Paris Court of Appeal upheld an ICC award, in which Al Waleed Bin Talal would be required to pay $22m to LBCI.

== LBC ownership battle ==
The Lebanese Forces initiated proceedings in Lebanon claiming ownership of LBCI and alleging criminal violations by El Daher. The Court of Appeal rejected these claims but the Court of Cassation – Criminal Chamber decided to refer the case to the Sole Criminal Judge in Beirut. On 28 February 2019, Judge Fatima al-Jouni issued a decision dropping all charges against LBCI and Pierre El Daher in the lawsuit filed by the Lebanese Forces over the ownership of the TV channel, refuting all that has been submitted in evidence and ordering the Lebanese Forces party to pay all costs and expenses.
