= Mirna Murr =

Lebanese politician

Mirna el Murr Abou Charaf (Arabic: ميرنا المرّ, romanized: Mīrnā al-Murr) is the head of the Federation of Municipalities of the Metn (اتحاد بلديات المتن) in Lebanon for three consecutive terms.

She was born into a Greek Orthodox Christian family. Her father was the Lebanese politician, former Member of Parliament and government minister Michel Murr and she is the sister of the former Lebanese government minister Elias Murr.

She was married to and eventually divorced from Lebanese journalist, politician and assassinated Member of Parliament Gebran Tueni and is the mother of Michelle Tueni and the journalist and Member of Parliament Nayla Tueni.

She ran for election to the Lebanese Parliament and upon the declaration of a win for her uncle Gabriel Murr, successfully contested the election in courts, leading to the annulment of the election of Gabriel Murr.
