= Fouad Najjar =

Lebanese agronomist and politician (1909–1992)

Minister of Agriculture
- In office 1964–1964

Minister of Agriculture and PTT
- In office 1959–1960

Minister of Agriculture
- In office 1958–1958

Personal details
- Born: Fouad Amine Najjar; December 1909 Abadiyeh, Lebanon
- Died: 1992 (aged 82–83)
- Spouse: Anissa Rawda
- Children: 3

Fouad Najjar (1909–1992) was a Lebanese agronomist and politician who served as minister of agriculture in 1958 and in 1964. He was also minister of agriculture and PTT between 1959 and 1960.

== Early life and education ==
Najjar was born in Abadiyeh, Lebanon, in December 1909. He hailed from a Druze family. His parents were Amine and Adla Najjar.

Najjar was a graduate of the University College of Aley and French Lycée of Beirut. Then he graduated from the Higher National School of Agronomy in Montpellier, France, and received a Ph.D. in agronomy in 1932.

== Career and activities ==
Following his graduation Najjar established an agricultural company and cofounded with his uncle an agricultural cooperation in Abadiyeh in 1937. He worked as a lecturer at the American University of Beirut from 1938 to 1948. He was appointed minister of agriculture in 1958. Next year he was named as minister of agriculture and PTT which he held until 1960. He continued to serve in the post as part of the cabinet of Ahmad Daouk between May and July 1960.

Najjar was elected as the president of the Lebanese Agriculturists in 1961. He became a member of the Druze Council in 1962. He was appointed minister of agriculture in 1964. He was named as the president of the Agronomy Research Institute in 1969.

Najjar represented Lebanon at various meetings of the Food and Agriculture Organization.

== Personal life and death ==
Najjar married Anissa Rawda on 4 April 1944, and they had 3 children. He died in 1992.
