= Basmat Watan =

Lebanese political satire program

- Genre: Political satire, Comedy
- Created by: Charbel Khalil
- Original language: Arabic

Production
- Production location: Lebanon

Original release
- Network: Lebanese Broadcasting Corporation
- Release: 1995 – present

Basmat Watan (Arabic: بس مات وطن) is a political-satire and slapstick Lebanese television program that is aired by the Lebanese Broadcasting Corporation, a privately owned television station in Lebanon. The show was created by Charbel Khalil, with the first episode airing in 1995. The title of the program is a pun, as in Lebanese Arabic the title can either refer to either the "death" or "smiles" of a nation. Basmat Watan is the longest-running political satire program in Lebanon.

== Origins ==
In 1995, Basmat Watan started by lampooning Lebanese political figures, including the then Prime Minister of Lebanon Rafic Hariri.

== Politics ==
Khalil, who is also the producer of the show, says the show does not favor any political party in Lebanon and that "the key is to take on absolutely everyone". One sketch on the show depicted a journalist with a swollen face after an interview with the allegedly quick-tempered Michel Aoun, leader of the Free Patriotic Movement. In an interview with The New York Times, Khalil responded to suggestions that he targeted the Hezbollah ruling party more, saying "I criticize them more because they are the majority in Parliament", adding "if they lose, I will criticize the other side more."
