= Bustros family =

Lebanese Christian Greek-Orthodox family

The Bustros family is a prominent Lebanese Antiochian Greek Orthodox/Catholic family. One of the “Seven Families”, it is one of the original Beirut families along with the descendants of Sursock, Fernaine, Dagher, Trad, Tueni and Gebeily families, who constituted the traditional high society of Beirut. Estate holders and feudal lords by origin, today they are business owners, artists and land owners throughout the country.

The surname Bustros is believed to spring out of another name of Greek origin, Silvestros, meaning the Savior. Coming from Greece in the 1620-1630 period, a Silvestros Bishop landed in Enfeh, in north Lebanon, then settled in the old city of Beirut. The actual name is sometimes preceded with the French article "de" meaning "of the house of"; although its use is diminishing today amongst members of the family.

Nicolas Bustros (father of Michel Bustros) received visitors such as Grand Duke Serge of Russia, the German Emperor William II, and the local Ottoman governors Youssef Franco-Pacha and Jamal Pasha in their sumptuous palace.

Michel Bustros launched Château Kefraya in 1946, establishing it as a leading winery in Lebanon. Over the years, it has gained international recognition and is now ranked among the top 50 wineries in the world. Today, his son co-owns the winery alongside Walid Jumblatt.

Several members of the Bustros Family were among the founders of Spartali & Co, an important 19th century export-import company which is active up to the present.

"Palais Bustros", or the Bustros Palace, originally one of the residences of the Fadlallah branch, is today one of the historical landmarks of Beirut. The palace houses the Ministry of Foreign Affairs and Emigrants. The palace of Nicolas Bustros, a 1930s landmark, was demolished during the civil war (1975/1990). A third palace belonging to the Abdallah branch, has been turned into a Fitness Club.

"Rue Selim Bustros" or Bustros Street in the Achrafieh district of Beirut is one of the commercial and business hubs of the Lebanese capital. "Rue Michel Bustros" is another street in the Achrafieh district which is commonly referred to as " Talaat Accaoui "

Beirut: The Last Home Movie is a documentary about the struggles that members of the Bustros family faced living in Beirut during the Lebanese civil war.

== Some Prominent Members of the Bustros family ==
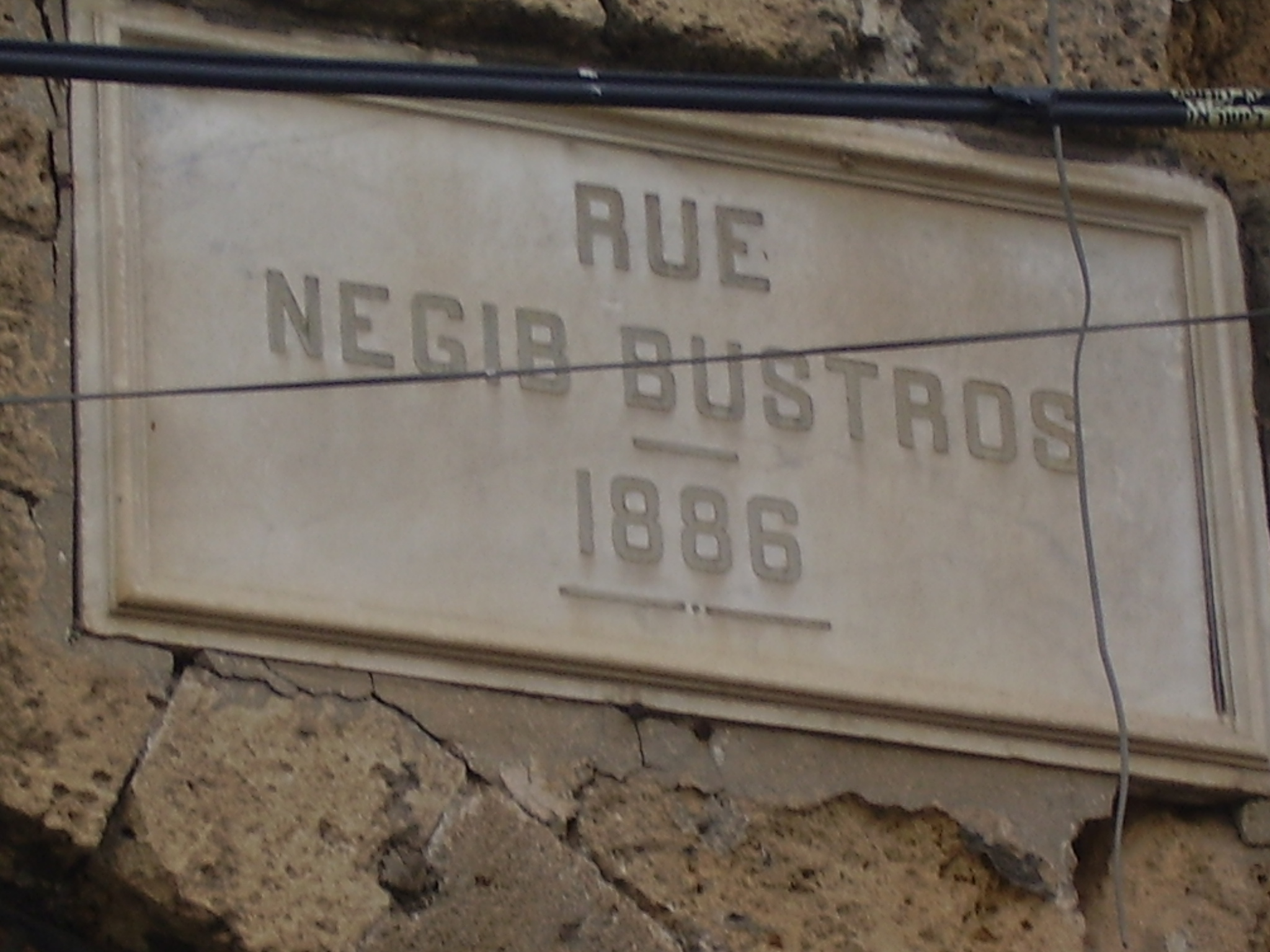
Street name in Jaffa

- Dany Bustros, bellydancer, socialite and stage actress
- Archbishop Cyril Salim Bustros, eparch of the Melkite Greek Catholic Church in Beirut and Byblos.
- Michel Sassine, Son of Laurice Bustros, prominent Lebanese politician
- Evelyn Bustros activist for women's rights and social reformer; former president of the Lebanese Council of Women
- Michel de Bustros Lebanese businessmen and founder of Chateau Kefraya
