= Anissa Rawda Najjar =

Lebanese feminist activist (1913–2016)

- 2014 Lebanese stamp honoring Najjar
- Born: Anissa Rawda; June 26, 1913; Beirut, Lebanon, Ottoman Empire
- Died: January 14, 2016 (aged 102)
- Occupations: Women's and rural activist

Anissa Rawda Najjar (Arabic: أنيسة روضة نجار; June 26, 1913 – January 14, 2016) was a Lebanese feminist and women's rights activist. She was a co-founder and longtime leader of the Village Welfare Society (Jam`iyat In`ash Al-Qarya). As well, she introduced the Lebanon Chapter of CISV.

== Early life ==
Anissa Rawda (her original surname is also seen as "Raouda" or "Rawdah") was born in Beirut, the daughter of landowner and pharmacist Salim Anis Rawda and Zalfa Amine Najjar. Her younger sister Saloua Raouda Choucair became a noted painter and sculptor.

She was educated at the Beirut College for Women and at the American University of Beirut, where she completed her studies in sociology and education in 1936.

== Career ==
Najjar's activism focused on rural development and women's lives. She worked for the establishment of schools and clinics accessible to rural families. In 1953 she and Evelyne Bustros founded the Village Welfare Society, to advance literacy and economic opportunities for rural women in Lebanon. She created a certificate, the "Rural Brevet", as an incentive for women to attend her the society's practical workshops on literacy, childcare, nutrition, hygiene, and agriculture; the program soon expanded to include some content on broader topics such as literature, politics, music, and religion. She served as secretary of the Lebanese Council of Women, and as general secretary of the Druze Orphanage from 1948; she also helped found Lebanon's League for Good Housekeeping.

Outside of Lebanon, for five years during World War II, she was principal of two girls' schools in Iraq. She was a frequent delegate to international conferences on women, including UNESCO events, representing Lebanese women. She attended the Third World Conference on Women in 1985, in Nairobi, and the Fourth World Conference on Women in 1995, in Beijing. She helped found Lebanon's chapter of the Women's International League for Peace and Freedom in 1961, and was elected vice-president of the international organization in 1977 and 1983.

A Lebanese postage stamp featuring Najjar's face and name was issued in 2014, soon after her 100th birthday. She was also awarded the Lebanese Order of Merit medal, twice, and the Lebanese Army Shield.

== Personal life ==
In 1944 she married agronomist Fouad Amine Najjar, who became minister of agriculture in 1959. They had three children, all of whom became agricultural engineers in adulthood. She was widowed in 1992 when Fouad died in a car accident. She was nearly 103 years old when she died in 2016.
