= Gabriel Murr =

Lebanese politician

Gabriel Murr (Arabic: غابريال المرّ, romanized: Ghābriyēl al-Murr; born 26 February 1939) is a Lebanese politician and businessman who launched MTV in 1991, and is the brother of Michel Murr. He is an open critic of the relationship that Lebanon had with the former Assad Regime.

== Personal life and education ==
Gabriel Murr was born on 26 February 1939. He has a civil engineering degree from the American University of Beirut in 1963.

He married Hoda Roos with whom he has four children.

== Controversies ==
There was some controversy whether or not he had won the Matn election against his niece Mirna Murr, in order to enter the parliament in 2002 after the death of Albert Moukheiber, but it was decided that he had won the election.

In April 2019, he accused his son Michel of sending individuals to besiege his office.

== See also ==
- Mirna Murr
