= Elias Murr =

Lebanese politician (born 1962)

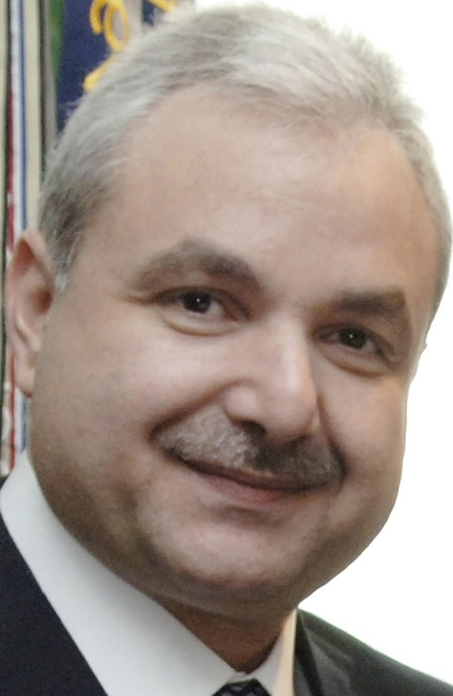
- Elias Murr in 2007
- Born: 30 January 1962 (age 64); Bteghrine, Lebanon
- Father: Michel Murr
- Relatives: Mirna Murr (sister)

Elias Murr (Arabic: إلياس المرّ, ʾIlyās al-Murr; born 30 January 1962) is a Lebanese politician and an International political figure.

== Early life and education ==
Murr was born on 30 January 1962 in Bteghrine. He is the son of former deputy Prime Minister and interior minister, Michel Murr. He holds a master's degree in law. He was married to the daughter of former President Emile Lahoud.

== Political career ==
Elias Murr started his political career as the mayor of Bteghrine, his hometown, from 1982 till 1996.

From 2000 to 2005 Murr was Deputy Prime Minister and Minister of the Interior and Municipalities, replacing his father Michel Murr. In 2001 he oversaw the drafting and signature of the International Labour Organization at the convention to execute the Action program to protect working children and to combat and eliminate child labor. During his ministry, Murr was appointed acting Minister of Foreign Affairs.

Murr was appointed Deputy Prime Minister and Minister of National Defense from 2005 and 2008.

Murr supports international police cooperation, and served from 2000 to 2004 as president of the Arab Interior Minister Council, which coordinates internal security and crime fighting among Arab nations.

In 2009, Elias Murr was appointed Deputy Prime Minister and Defense Minister.

In 2010, Murr was a member of the Lebanese National Dialogue committee.

In October 2013, Murr was appointed the President of the Board of the Interpol Foundation for a Safer World, which aims to strengthen the capabilities of Interpol to fight money laundering, organized crime and financing of terrorism.

Murr took part in many negotiations with the United Nations, and oversaw the deployment of 25,000 soldiers for the implementation of UNSC resolution 1701, preserving the cease fire mandated by the international community. Elias Murr is an honored officer of the National Cedar Legion and the holder of the Grand Cross of the Order of Spain.

== Assassination attempt ==
On 12 July 2005, Murr was targeted by a circa 20-kg improvised explosive device in the city of Antelias, 5 km north of Beirut. 12 people were injured, and one person was killed by the explosion that almost took the life of the Deputy Prime Minister at the time. Murr said that he knew an attempt on his life had been planned for months, and had informed the state security services. According to various sources, the assassination attempt is linked to Hezbollah's assassination squad - Unit 121.

== Business activities ==
In parallel with his political endeavors, Murr spent the past twenty years at the helm of "Group Murr", founded in 1957 by his father as a construction company operating in the public works sector.

Group Murr is featured in Forbes' "Top 100 Making An Impact in the Arab World" list.

In 2015, the group holds more than 25 companies, operating across three continents and a wide range of segments of the international market, including: Construction, real estate and resort development, engineering, consumer products, aviation services, security, commercial services for the shipping industry.

Murr also serves as the chairman of the board of the Al Joumhouria News Corporation, the publisher of one of Lebanon's leading daily newspapers and of several other thematic periodicals.

After stopping publications throughout the Lebanese civil war, under H.E. Murr's leadership the Al Joumhouria newspaper, saw its rebirth in 2011, and became the first Lebanese newspaper to embrace new media, by developing proprietary mobile applications, push notifications, and developing an award-winning website for its digital edition. Murr is also the chairman of the board of Pan Arab News; a website currently under construction, combining innovation and creativity with using smart technologies to offer its users a unique experience. Pan Arab News will tackle Middle East news as well as the latest events in the Gulf Region.

== WikiLeaks accusations ==
In December 2010, a Lebanese Newspaper posted on its website cables from the United States diplomatic cables leak revealing that Murr had separated the army from Hezbollah if a new war was to erupt on Israel's northern border.
