= MTV (Lebanon) =

Television network in Lebanon

MTV Lebanon
- Logo used since 2009
- Country: Lebanon
- Broadcast area: Lebanon; Worldwide (via internet)
- Affiliates: One TV Lebanon
- Headquarters: Naccache, Lebanon

Programming
- Languages: Arabic; Lebanese Arabic
- Picture format: PAL; HDTV 1080i

Ownership
- Owner: Metn Bloc
- Key people: Michel Murr (founder & CEO); Walid Abboud (Editor-In-Chief)

History
- Launched: 7 November 1991 (original); 7 April 2009 (relaunch)
- Closed: 2002 (original)

Links
- Website: www.mtv.com.lb

Availability

Streaming media
- MTV Live: Free (inside Lebanon) / Paid (outside Lebanon)
- Cablevision+ (IPTV in Lebanon): Channel 2 - General

Murr Television, marketed and known as MTV Lebanon, is a Lebanese television station based in Naccache, Metn District. It was founded in 1991 by businessman Michel El Murr, son of Gabriel Murr (brother of Lebanese politician Michel Murr), as an independent channel emphasizing local programming while also broadcasting Arab and Western content.

== History ==
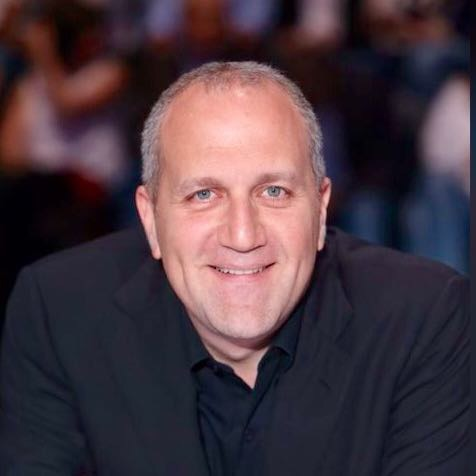
Michel Gabriel El Murr, CEO, son of Gabriel Murr

In 2002, the station was shut down for allegedly violating the 1999 electoral law. Some observers considered the closure to be politically motivated, given MTV’s criticism of the Lebanese government and Syria.

MTV remained off the air until 7 April 2009, shortly before the 2009 parliamentary elections.

== Awards ==
MTV television and Michel El Murr are the recipient of the Washington DC based Transatlantic Leadership Network 2021 "Freedom of the Media" award for International Reporting.

== Production ==
All MTV productions are done in partnership with Studiovision, a regional production company operating studios in Lebanon and Dubai.

== Website and mobile application ==
Access to premium content on MTV’s website and mobile apps is free within Lebanon, while users outside Lebanon generally require a paid subscription.

== Ownership ==
According to the Lebanese Ministry of Justice’s Commercial Register, MTV SAL is co-owned by Gabriel El Murr's four children (Michel, Jyad, Carl, and Carole) and Joseph Sarkis. The register does not detail the specific distribution of shares.
