= Bustros Palace =

Palace in Beirut, Lebanon

Coordinates: 33.89062845505967°N 35.51678745402308°E

Bustros Palace is a palace on Michel Bustros street in the Rmeil area of Beirut, Lebanon. It was originally one of the residences of the Bustros family and is today one of the historical landmarks of Beirut. It currently houses the Ministry of Foreign Affairs and Emigrants. It was heavily damaged by the 2020 Beirut explosions, with the roof mostly destroyed and the walls bowing out. It has since been restored.
