= Nadia Tueni =

Lebanese poet and writer

- نادية تويني
- Born: Nadia Hamadeh; July 8, 1935; Beirut
- Died: June 20, 1983 (aged 47); Beit Meri
- Education: Université Saint-Joseph de Beyrouth
- Occupations: Poet, writer
- Notable work: Les Texts Blonds, La Terre Arretee
- Spouse: Ghassan Tueni (1954–1983; her death)
- Children: 3, including Gebran Tueni
- Father: Mohamad Ali Hamadé
- Relatives: Marwan Hamadeh (brother), Ali Hamade (brother)
- Honours: Prix Archon-Despérouses

Nadia Mohammad Ali Hamade (July 8, 1935 – June 20, 1983) was a Lebanese Francophone poet, who authored numerous volumes of poetry.

== Early life ==
Nadia Mohamad Ali Hamadeh was born in Beirut in 1935, to a Lebanese Druze father, Mohamad Ali Hamadeh, who was a notable diplomat and ambassador, and a French mother. She grew up as bilingual. in the presence of two cultures. Her brother, Marwan Hamadeh, is an politician, member of parliament since 1991 and minister, and her half brother, Ali Hamade, is a journalist at An Nahar Newspaper, a consultant at Al Hadath and Al Arabiya and was a notable host on Future TV from 2004 to 2013.

== Education ==
Nadia Tueni was educated in French schools in Lebanon and Greece. She attended Ecole des Soeurs de Besançon, then La Mission Laïque Française. She received her secondary education at the Lycée Français in Athens where her father was ambassador of Lebanon. She received her law degree at the Université Saint-Joseph in Beirut. However, there is another report stating that she attended the Université Saint-Joseph, but could not complete her study there due to her marriage in 1954.

== Career ==
Tueni published her first book of poems, Les Textes Blonds, in 1963. She worked as the literary editor of the Lebanese French-language newspaper, Le Jour, in 1967 and contributed to various Arabic and French publications.

She starred in Maroun Bagdadi's 1980 documentary film Whispers, where she journeyed through Lebanon in the aftermath of the first five years of the Lebanese Civil War.

== Personal life ==
She married Ghassan Tueni, the publisher of An Nahar and doyen of the Lebanese press, in 1953 in a civil marriage ceremony. They had three children, all of whom would predecease their father, who long outlived her. Her son, Gebran Tueni, a journalist and politician, was assassinated in 2005. Another son, Makram, was 21 when he died in a car accident in Paris in 1987. A daughter, Nayla, who was born in 1955 died of cancer at age 7. Her death deeply affected Nadia and led her to compose her first collection: Les Textes Blonds, which was published in 1963. In 1967, she became a literary editor at Le Jour, where she contributed to various Arabic and French publications. She also has a brother, the minister and deputy Marwan Hamade and another brother, a journalist in An Nahar daily newspaper, Ali Hamade. She describes her country, Lebanon, in Poems of Love and War (2006:xxxv) as follows: "I belong to a country that commits suicide every day while it is being assassinated. As a matter of fact, I belong to a country that died several times. Why should I not die too of the gnawing, ugly, slow, and vicious death, of this Lebanese death?"

== Death ==
Nadia Tueni died in Beit Meri near Beirut in 1983 after an 18-year battle with cancer. She was 47.

== Awards ==
She received several awards during her lifetime, including the Prix de l'Académie Française, the Order of La Pléiade, and the Prix Said Akl.

== Publications ==
- Les Textes Blonds (Blonde Texts; 1963)
- L'Âge d'écume (1965)
- Juin et les Mécréantes (1968)
- Poèmes pour une histoire (1972)
- Le Rêveur de Terre (Dreamers of the Earth; 1975)
- La Terre Arretee (The Earth stopped, (Posthumous); 1984)
- Liban: vingt poèmes pour un amour (Lebanon: Twenty Poems for One Love dedicated to her daughter Nayla; 1979)
- Archives Sentimentales D'une Guerre Au Liban (Archives of a sentimental war in Lebanon; 1982)
- La Terre arrêtée (1984)
- Une guerre pour les autres (1985)
- Jenseits des Blickes
- Poèmes pour une histoire (1972; awarded by Prix de l'Académie Française in 1973)
