= Lebanese Broadcasting Corporation International =

Television network in Lebanon

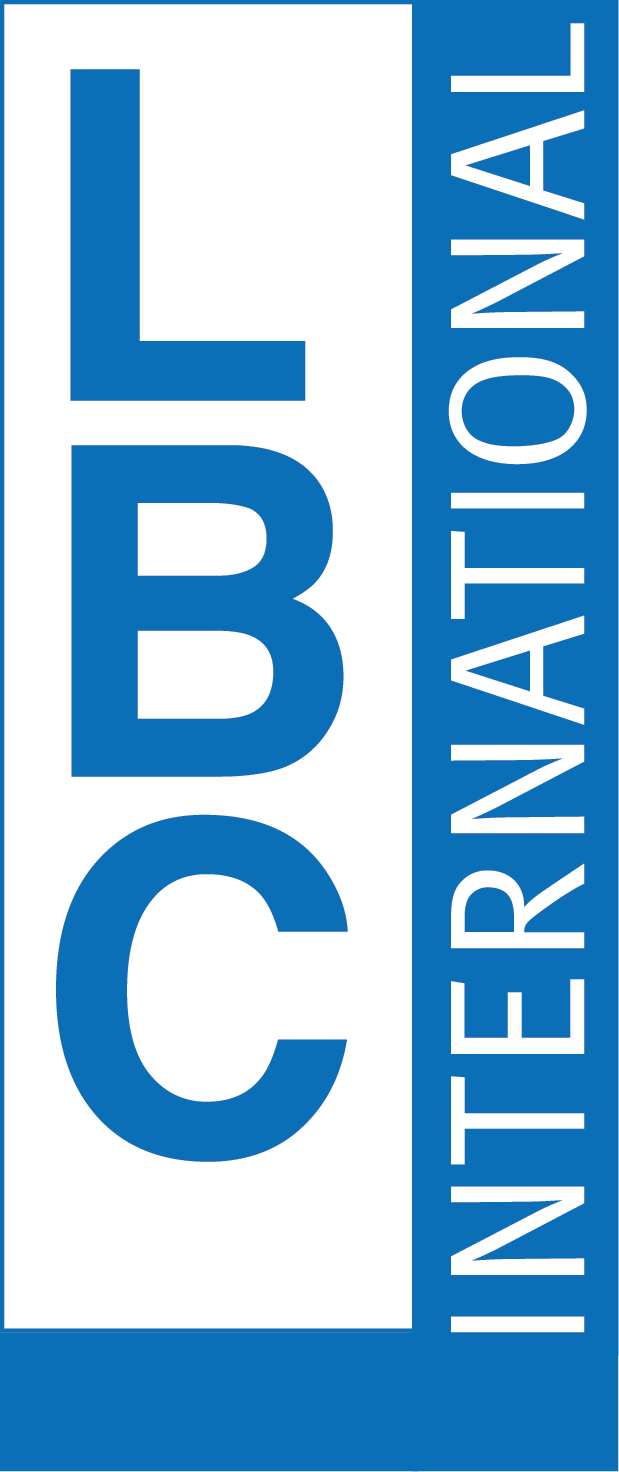
- Logo used since 2012
- Type: Terrestrial television network
- Country: Lebanon
- Broadcast area: Lebanon; Worldwide (via satellite and internet)
- Headquarters: Adma, Lebanon

Ownership
- Owner: See Ownership
- Key people: Pierre El Daher (chairman & CEO)

History
- Launched: 23 August 1985; 41 years ago (television network)

Links
- Website: www.lbcgroup.tv

Availability

Terrestrial
- Cablevision (Lebanon): Back to Basic package - General (Pay television)

Streaming media
- Cablevision+ (IPTV in Lebanon): Channel 1 - General

The Lebanese Broadcasting Corporation International, (Note: Arabic: المؤسسة اللبنانية للإرسال انترناسيونال, romanized: Al-Muasasat Al-Lubnaniat lil-'irsal Intirnasyunal) widely known as LBCI, (Note: Arabic: آل بي سي آي, romanized: Al Bi Si Aī) Lebanese Broadcasting Corporation (Note: Arabic: المؤسسة اللبنانية للإرسال, romanized: Al-Muasasat Al-Lubnaniat lil-'irsal) or LBC (Note: Arabic: آل بي سي, romanized: Al Bi Si), is a private television station in Lebanon. LBCI was founded in 1992 by acquiring the assets, liabilities and logo of LBC, an entity founded in 1985 during the Lebanese Civil War by the Lebanese Forces militia.

LBCI went global in 1996 when it launched its satellite channel LBC Al-Fadha'iya Al-Lubnaniya (Arabic: الفضائية اللبنانية) covering Lebanon, the Arab world, Europe, America, Australia, and Africa.

== History ==
=== Post-war era ===
The Lebanese Forces, a Lebanese militia that had founded LBC in 1985, was militarily and financially weakened by the Lebanese civil war which ended in 1990 and its leader Samir Geagea was imprisoned in 1994. In 1989, Pierre El Daher had founded LBCI along with other shareholders and registered it at the Commercial Register of Baabda. In April 1996, El Daher and other shareholders launched LBCsat, a free satellite channel. The new channel was a success, disseminated throughout the world, especially attracting the Lebanese diaspora.

In 2003, as a result of an agreement between Saleh Kamel, founder of LMH company (Lebanese Media Holding, owner of 49% of LBC SAT and Pac's shares) and Saudi prince Al Waleed bin Talal, the latter, through Kingdom, replaced Kamel in LMH.

By the end of 2008, it was decided to increase the capital of LMH considerably. Accordingly, Al-Waleed Bin Talal became the largest shareholder after acquiring the absolute majority in PAC (a content provider for both LBCI and LBC SAT) and LBC SAT, based on an understanding that the capital increase would be invested to improve the programs’ network and upgrade productivity under the supervision of Sheikh Pierre Daher.

In 2010, Rupert Murdoch joined the group and PAC and LBC SAT were merged with Rotana. Rumor was that this merger would improve and develop the group. These expectations did not materialize.

=== Al Hayat and LBC SAT merger ===
At the end of the year 2002, LBC SAT and the London-based Al Hayat newspaper owned by Saudis, merged their news programs. LBC SAT daily news bulletin was called the "Al Hayat-LBC SAT news bulletin". The cooperation ended in 2010.

== Ownership ==
According to the Media Ownership Monitor, an initiative by Reporters Without Borders and the Samir Kassir Foundation, the majority owner of the station is Pierre El Daher and his family who owns 50.6% share since 1992. before Pierre El Daher bought it, it was previously owned by the Lebanese Forces. Other key shareholders include former Deputy Prime Minister Issam Fares and his son Najad, who own 10% each. Maroun Jazzar owns 4.4%, Investcom, which is owned by Prime Minister Najib Mikati's family, has a 4% share and Salah Osseiran also has a 4% share.

== Television channels ==
=== Domestic ===
- LBCI, shortened for LBC International – a local and terrestrial channel for Lebanese viewers broadcasting a variety of programs of different genres.
- LDC (widely known as LBC Drama or LB2) – a local channel dedicated to around the clock reruns of entertainment shows and series.
- LBC Sat (widely known as LBC Al-Fadha'iyya Al-Lubnaniyya) - a free-to-air channel dedicated to foreign viewers. It was launched 1 April 1996. Since 2012, it has been part of the Rotana Media Group

=== International ===
- LBC Europe – an international version of LBCI targeted to Lebanese citizens in Europe.
- LBC America – the international version of LBCI is targeted at Lebanese citizens in America.

In December 2019, LBCI announced that the LDC brand would be discontinued by the beginning of the year 2020 and that all programs will be broadcast via LBCI. The main reason behind the decision was that the LDC branding was no longer needed since the battle for the LBC brand and channels with Al Walid Bin Talal has been resolved and won by LBCI current owner, Pierre El Daher.

=== Defunct ===
- Lebanese Diaspora Channel (LDC) – an international version of LBCI targeted at Lebanese in diaspora countries.
- LBCI News – local, news-focussed channel.
- LBC Australia – the international version of LBCI was targeted at Lebanese citizens in Australia.
- LBC Africa – the international version of LBCI was targeted at Lebanese in Africa.
- LBC Maghreb – international version of LBCI targeted at Lebanese citizens in the Middle East and North Africa.
- LBC plus – an international version of LBC Sat targeted at subscribers.
- Waw – an international version of LBC Sat targeted at subscribers.
- LBC Nagham – an international channel focusing on music clips and reality TV shows.
- C33 – local channel focussed on French-language programming.

=== Logos ===
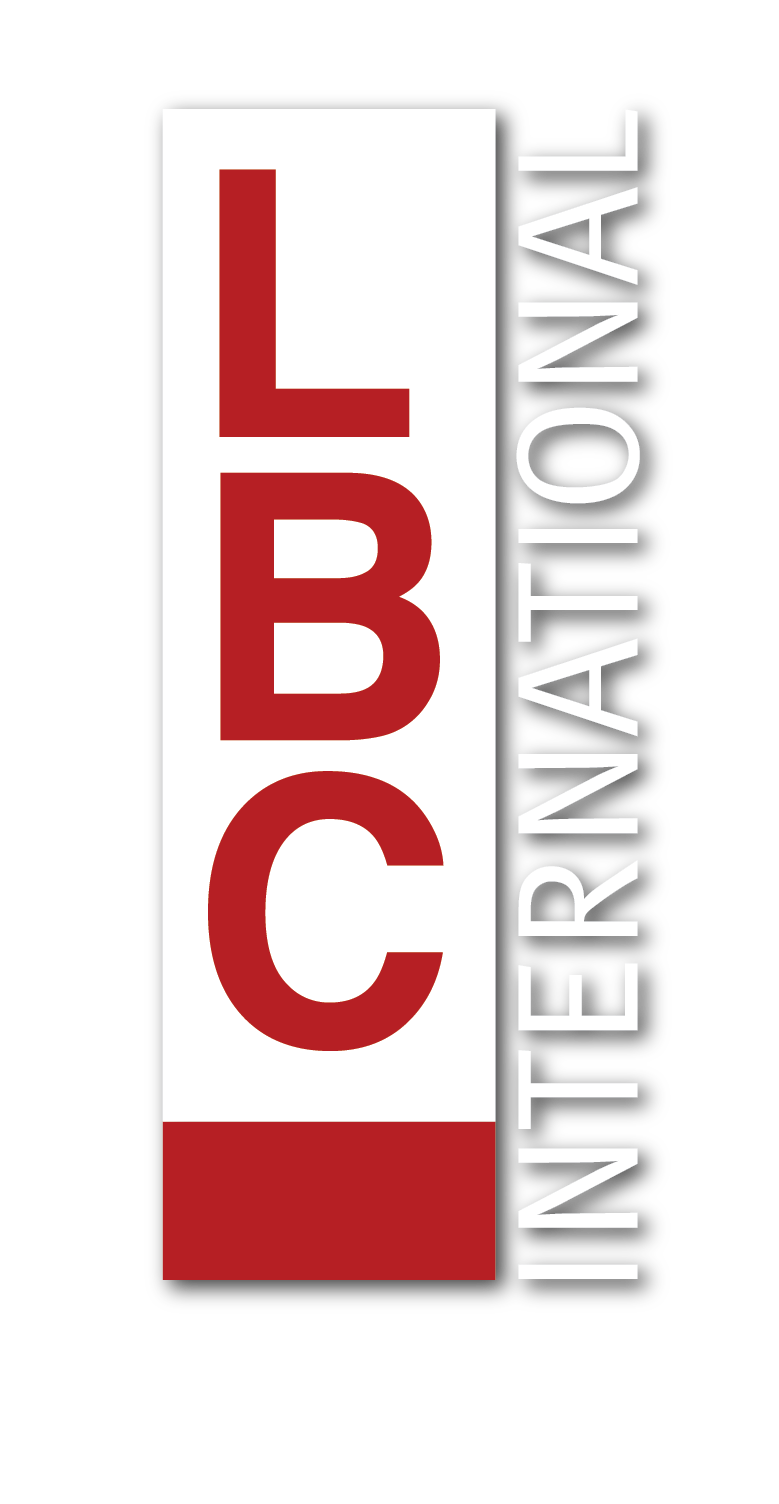
LBCI Drama logo

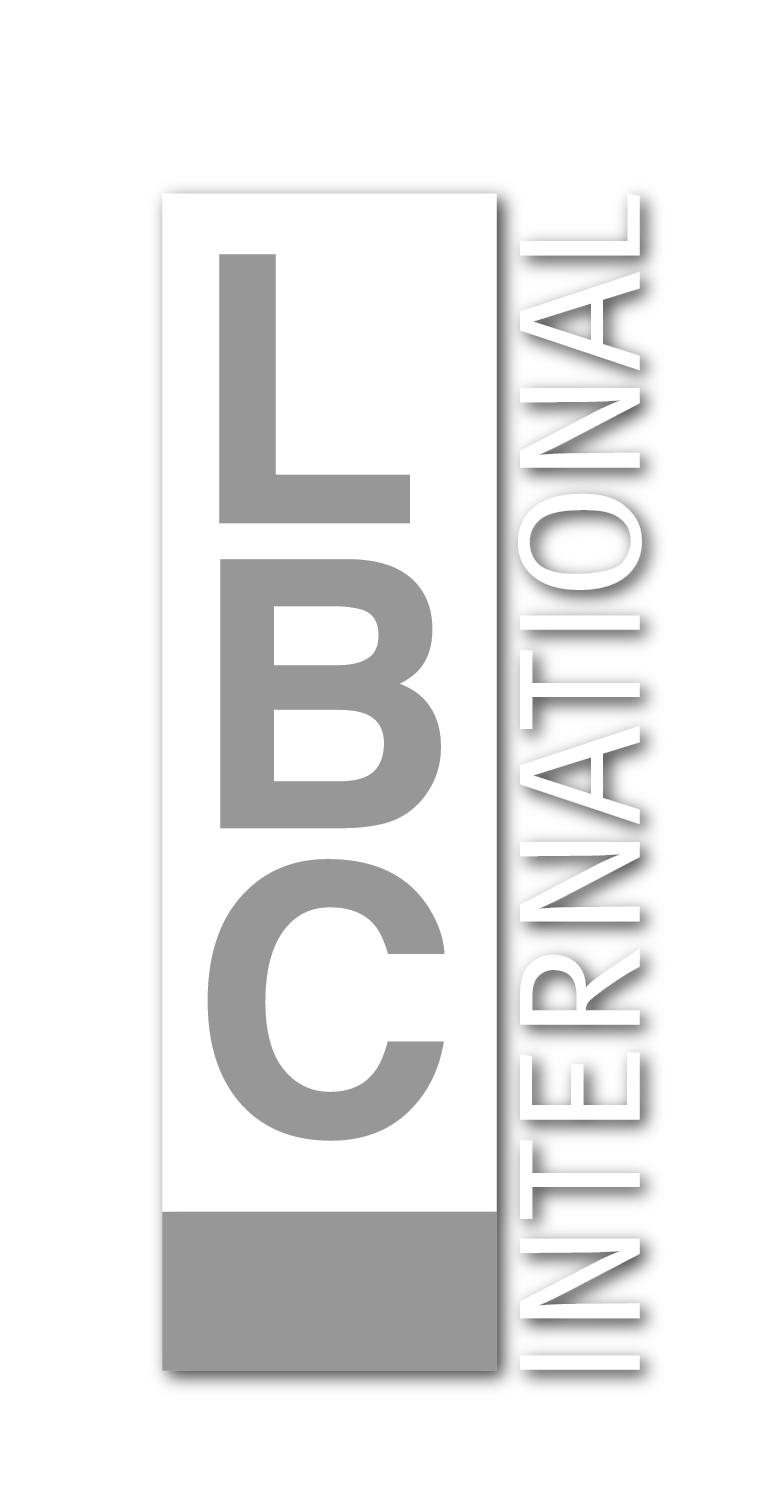
LBCI News logo

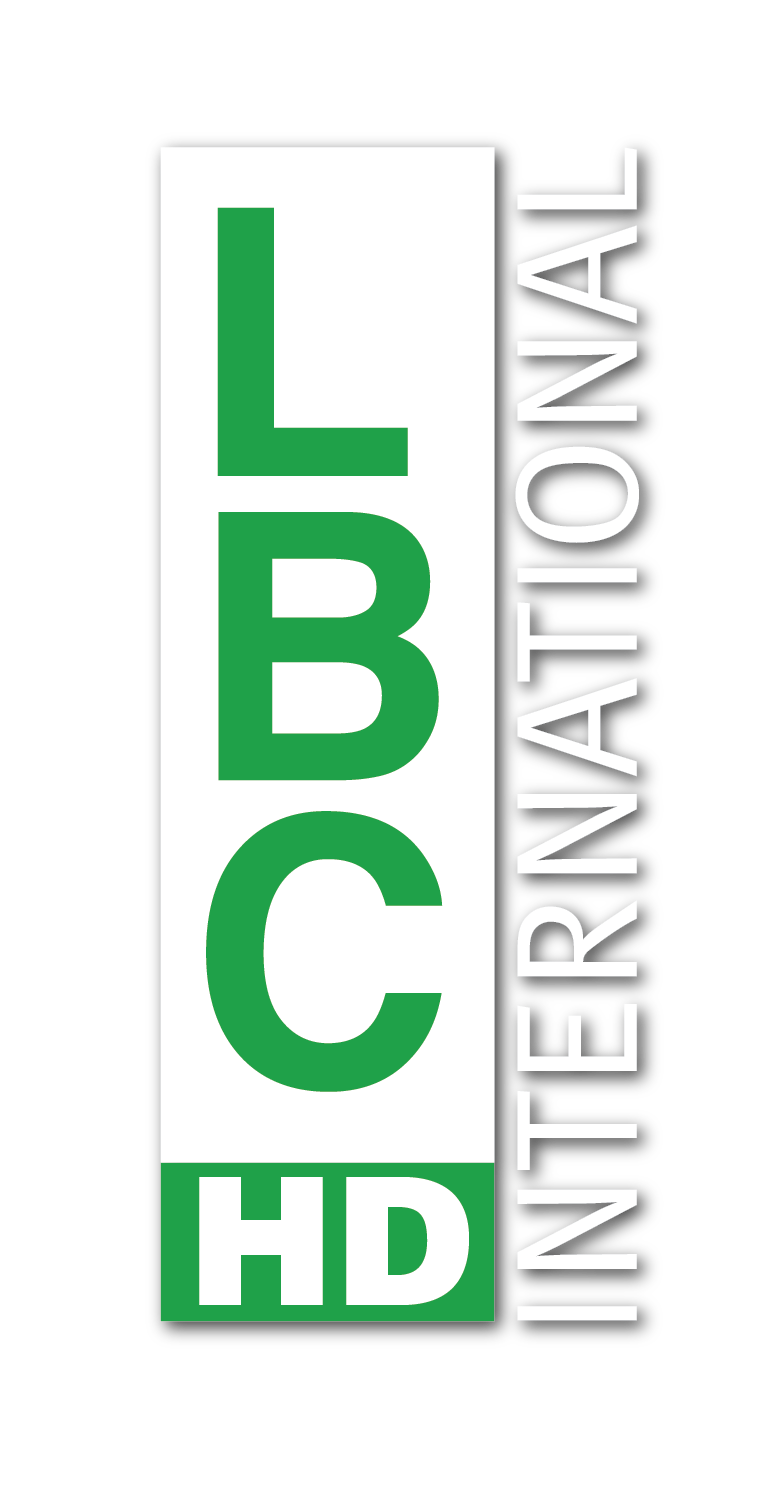
LBCI HD logo

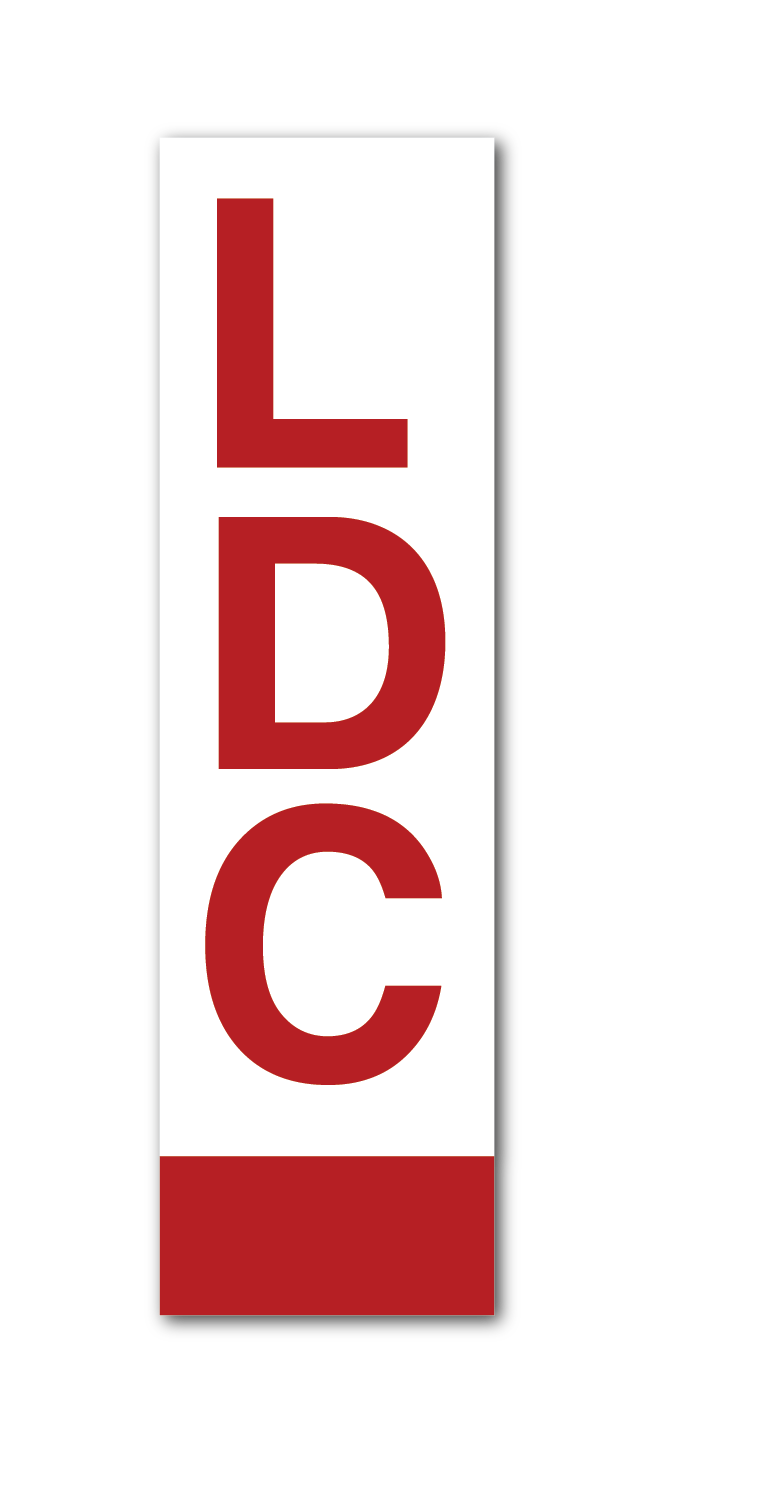
LDC logo

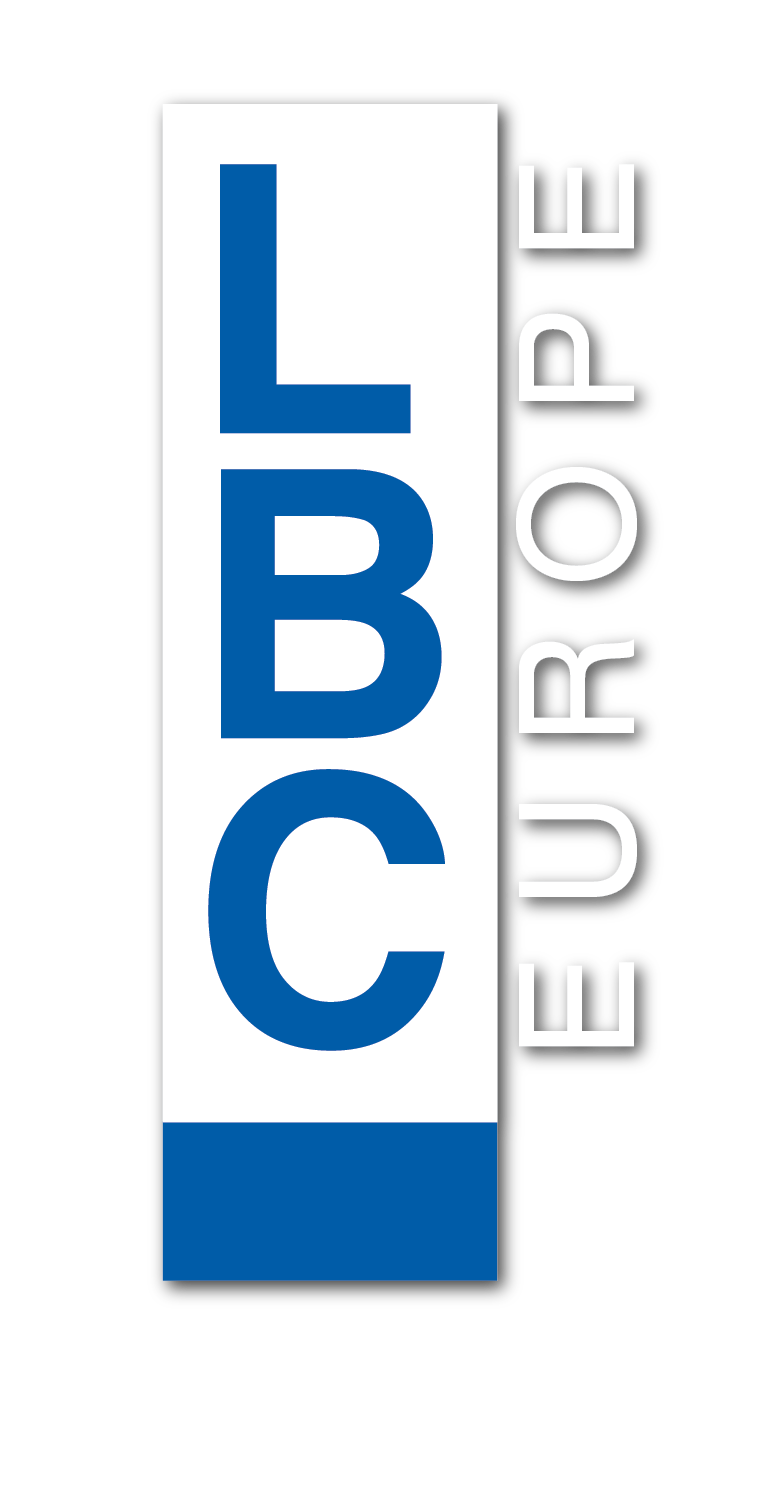
LBC Europe logo

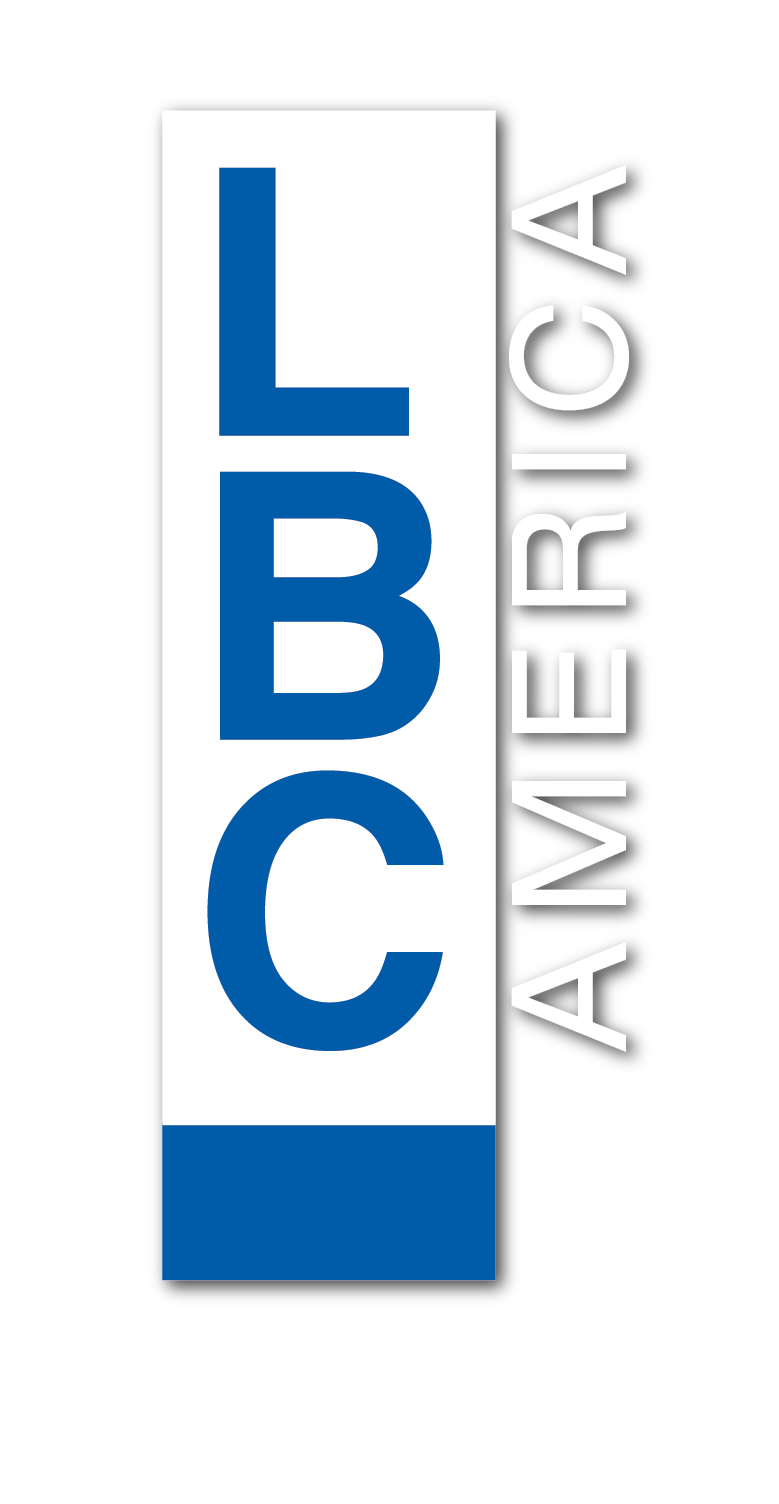
LBC America logo

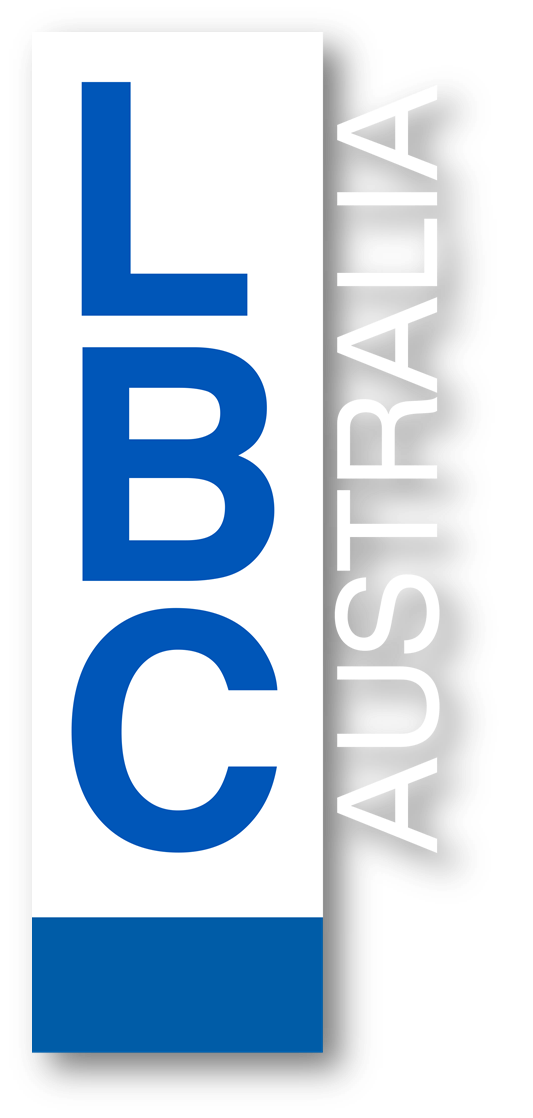
LBC Australia logo

== Programs ==
LBCI has produced many shows including: Star Academy Arab World, Ya Katel Ya Maktoul (Arabic version of Greed), Miss Lebanon, Hellha wo Ehtalha (Arabic version of French TV Show Fort Boyard), Survivor Middle East, and El Wadi (Arabic version of The Farm). Its most famous talk show is Kalam Ennas (Arabic: كلام الناس) hosted by Marcel Ghanem. The show, which originally aired on C33, moved to LBC after C33 was shut down in the mid-1990s.

- Project Runway
- Arabs Got Talent
- The Voice
- Ahmar Bel Khat El Arid
- The Winner Is
- Celebrity Duets
- Top Chef Middle East
- Beirut I Love You
- Basmat Watan
- Kids Power
- The Brothers Grunt on MTV
- Inside Game
- Star Academy Arab World
- Sunday Mass
- Splash!
- Miss Universe
- Miss Lebanon
- Survivor
- Gladiators
- Motorsports
- Perfect Bride
- دمى قراطية

== LBCI personalities ==
- Malek Maktabi
- Albert Kostanian
- Raneem Bou Khzam
- Roula Haddad
- Carla Haddad
- Mario Aboud
- Ragheda Shalhoub
- Rodolph Hilal
- Maya Abou Elhosn
- Rahaf Abdalla
- Anita Suliman
- Sandra Aboud
- George Souidi
- George Yones
- Amal Shihade
- Perla Najjar
- Yara Dergham
- Nada Indraous
- Elio Shamas
- Joe Farshakh
- Rawad Taha
- Bassam Abu Zaid
- Yazbek Wehbe
- Nisreen Zawahra
- John Ashkar
- Hicham Haddad
- Mouhamad Kais
- Toni Khalife
- Majdala Khattar
- Mirna Daou

== See also ==
- Television in Lebanon
