= Gebran Tueni =

Lebanese journalist, politician and businessman

- جبران تويني
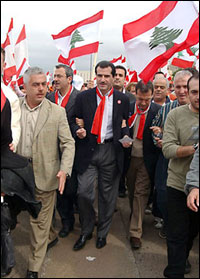
- Born: Gebran Ghassan Tueni; 15 September 1957; Achrafieh, Beirut
- Died: 12 December 2005 (aged 48); Mkalles, Matn District, Beirut
- Resting place: Saint Dimitrius church
- Education: École supérieure de journalisme de Paris
- Occupations: Journalist; politician; businessman
- Political party: Qornet Shehwan Gathering
- Spouse(s): Mirna Murr (divorced); Siham Asseily
- Children: Nayla Tueni, Michelle Tueni, Nadia Tueni, Gabriella Tueni
- Parent(s): Ghassan Tueni; Nadia Hamadeh
- Relatives: Marwan Hamadeh (uncle), Ali Hamade (uncle)
- Website: http://www.gebrantueni.com

Gebran Ghassan Tueni (Arabic: جبران تويني; 15 September 1957 – 12 December 2005) was a Lebanese politician and the former editor and publisher of daily paper An Nahar, established by his grandfather, also named Gebran Tueni, in 1933. He was assassinated in 2005 as part of a series of assassinations of Syria's critics in Lebanon.

== Early life ==
Gebran Tueni was born in Beirut on 15 September 1957. His father, Ghassan Tueni, was born into a prominent Lebanese Greek Orthodox family of Syrian descent, and was a veteran journalist and politician. His mother was the Francophone, Lebanese Druze poet, Nadia Hamadeh. His paternal grandfather was Gebran Tueni, a famous journalist and an Arab Renaissance figure who founded Al Ahrar and later on An Nahar. Gebran Tueni was named after his grandfather. His maternal grandfather, Mohammed Ali Hamadeh, was a diplomat and writer. His maternal uncle is the former Telecommunications Minister Marwan Hamadeh and the former journalist of An Nahar newspaper who was in Saad Hariri political party, Ali Hamadeh.

At age 18, Gebran Tueni experienced the horror of sectarian intolerance with the outbreak of the Lebanese civil war. He also served in the Lebanese army under a then law requiring students to serve for a year as reservists, either after high school or after college graduation. He served at Henry Chehab Barracks, and after boot camp he worked in the administrative section of the barracks in 1976, he was shot by Palestinian fighters that year, and was later kidnapped for 36 hours by Christian militiamen in 1977.

== Education ==
Tueni received Bachelor of Arts degree in international relations from École des Hautes Études in 1980. At the same period, he studied journalism at Ecole Supérieure de Journalisme de Paris and graduated in 1980. He also studied management at CEDEP-INSEAD in 1992.

== Career ==
Tueni's journalism career started when he became the general manager, editor in chief and editorialist for the weekly magazine An Nahar Arab and International that he and other journalists launched in Paris in 1979 and that was published until 1990. Then, he served as the general director of the daily paper An Nahar from 1993 to 1999 and the general director of the monthly magazine Noun from 1997 to 2000. His friendship with General Michel Aoun led to his exile to Paris from 1990 to 1993. He became an active member of the World Association of Newspapers (WAN) in 1990 and WAN's advisor on Middle-Eastern affairs. He was also a member of WAN's Fund for Press Freedom Development, created in 1994. Tueni was the publisher, chairman of the board, director and editorialist of An Nahar beginning on 1 January 2000 until his death on 12 December 2005.

He came to international prominence in March 2000 when he wrote a front-page letter to Bashar al-Assad, son and then-heir apparent to then-Syrian president Hafez al-Assad calling for the withdrawal of Syrian troops from Lebanon following the 1990 Taif Accords that ended Lebanon's civil war. With this editorial, he broke an important press taboo. His letter was published when a summit between then-US president Bill Clinton and then-Syrian President Hafez Assad was held in Geneva. Tueni's letter led to a public objection from some newspapers and Lebanese officials. However, other writers agreed with its premises. In April 2001, he cofounded the Qornet Shehwan Gathering together with nearly thirty Lebanese Christian politicians and public figures.

In March 2005, he contributed to the Cedar Revolution demonstrations during which he gave the speech, "In the name of God We, Muslims and Christians, Pledge that united we shall remain to the end of time to better defend our Lebanon". In May 2005, he was elected a member of Parliament of Lebanon for the Eastern Orthodox Christian seat in Beirut's first district on an anti-Syrian slate, namely Martyr Prime Minister Rafik Hariri's Beirut Decision List, led by Saad Hariri.

== Views ==
Tueni was a staunch advocate for freedom of speech and promoted critical discourse regarding the regime of Hafez al-Assad. He viewed Bashar al-Assad as a "new generation" leader and harbored hopes that his leadership would finally herald a transformation in Syria's political dynamics concerning Lebanon. However, as Bashar al-Assad aligned himself with then-Lebanese President Emile Lahoud and Hezbollah Secretary-General Hassan Nasrallah, instead of backing Lebanon's "democratic forces", Tueni's optimism gradually waned. He consequently became an outspoken critic of the Syrian government and its policies in Lebanon.

== Assassination and burial ==
Although Tueni continued his editorials in An Nahar, he was out of Beirut until shortly before his death. After the assassination of Rafic Hariri, he learned that he was on the top of a hit list and started taking preventative steps, like switching cars every other day. In June 2005, his star columnist Samir Kassir was assassinated. Then, he left Lebanon and stayed in Paris for a while and came back on 11 December 2005.

Tueni was assassinated by a car bomb on 12 December 2005 in Mkalles, an industrial suburb of Beirut, while he drove from his home in Beit Meri (Mount Lebanon) to his newspaper's offices in Beirut's Martyrs' Square. Two of his bodyguards were also killed in the blast. He was the seventh target in a series of assassinations of politicians, journalists and security personnel that had begun in Lebanon in 2005. According to sources his assassination among several others, were executed by Unit 121, as part of Hezbollah's policy.

His body was buried at Saint Dimitrius church graves after the funeral that took place at Saint George church in Beirut. Tens of thousands of mourners filled the streets of Beirut for Tueni's funeral on 14 December 2005. Many mourners blamed Syria for his death due to his anti-Syrian policy and they chanted anti-Syrian slogans. The members of the Lebanese parliament also observed a moment of silence during a special parliamentary session. Continuing the play on words with "An nahar" (The Day), family members stated that night would not fall on the newspaper.

=== Reactions and perpetrators ===
Initial reports published in Elaph indicated that a hitherto unknown group, "Strugglers for the Unity and Freedom of al-Sham" (where al-Sham refers to ancient Greater Syria) claimed responsibility. The statement taking responsibility was also faxed to Reuters and included a warning that the same fate awaited other opponents of "Arabism" in Lebanon, claiming that the assassination has succeeded in "shutting up" a traitor, and "turning An-Nahar (Arabic for Day) into ″Dark Night″.

Several anti-Syrian Lebanese politicians blamed Syria. However, Syrian authorities denied responsibility or complicity and stated that the crime was aimed at directing fresh accusations against Syria. Commentators stressed that the explosion occurred only a few hours before the UN investigating commission was due to submit an update of its report on the Hariri assassination to then-UN Secretary General Kofi Annan. In response, Lebanese Prime Minister Fouad Siniora announced that he would ask the United Nations Security Council to investigate Syrian complicity in the deaths of Tueni and other prominent anti-Syrian figures.

Before his death, Tueni was campaigning for an international probe into recently discovered mass graves in Anjar next to the main Syrian intelligence headquarters. Forensic analysis later showed the graves were part of an 18th-century cemetery. In his last editorial, Tueni accused Syria of committing "crimes against humanity" and blamed them for the mass graves and other atrocities committed in Lebanon during their presence. His articles and editorials in An Nahar often raised the ire of the Syrians.

Koïchiro Matsuura, director-general of UNESCO, said, "The global press community has lost one of its great defenders. Mr Tueni’s death is a terrible loss not only for his family, friends and colleagues, but for the cause of freedom of expression and press freedom in the Middle East. I must also voice my concern over the increasing number of attacks on Lebanese journalists and politicians in the course of this year."

=== Lawsuit ===
Boutros Harb is the lawyer of the Tueni family, and filed a lawsuit in October 2012 against two Syrian officers due to their alleged roles in Gebran Tueni's assassination.

== Personal life ==
Gebran Tueni was first married to Mirna Murr. The couple had two daughters, Nayla and Michelle. Mirna Murr is the daughter of Michel Murr, a Lebanese politician. They later divorced. His second spouse was Siham Asseily. He had twin daughters, Gabriella and Nadia, from his second marriage, who were just a few months old when he was killed.

== Legacy ==
=== Gebran Tueni Award ===
The World Association of Newspapers established a Gebran Tueni Award in 2006 after his death to be bestowed on "a newspaper publisher or editor in the Arab world who demonstrates the free press values" of the award's namesake.

The award has been given to the following journalists and media figures:

- 2012: Ali Farzat, Syrian cartoonist
- 2010: Aboubakr Jamaï, Le Journal Hebdomadaire, Morocco
- 2009: Asos Hardi, Awene, Iraqi Kurdistan
- 2008: Ibrahim Essa, Al Dustour, Egypt
- 2007: Michel Hajji Georgiou, L'Orient Le Jour, Lebanon
- 2006: Nadia Al-Sakkaf, Yemen Times, Yemen

=== Gebran Tueni Human Rights Fellowship Program ===
The Carr Center for Human Rights Policy at the John F. Kennedy School of Government at Harvard University and the Hariri Foundation-USA launched the Gebran G. Tueni Human Rights Fellowship Program on 21 January 2009. The Fellows were planned to undertake a major research project focusing on the areas of freedom of speech, arbitrary detention, or discrimination against minorities, displaced populations, or other vulnerable groups in one or more countries in the Middle East.

== See also ==
- List of assassinated Lebanese politicians
- List of extrajudicial killings and political violence in Lebanon
