= Michel Murr =

Lebanese politician (1931–2021)

- ميشال المرّ
- Born: 29 September 1931; Bteghrine, Metn, Greater Lebanon
- Died: 31 January 2021 (aged 89); Lebanon
- Occupation: Engineer
- Political party: Independent
- Children: 3, including Elias and Mirna
- Parent(s): Elias Murr (father); Rose Saliba (mother)
- Relatives: Gabriel Murr (brother); May Murr (sister); Gebran Tueni (former son-in-law); Nayla Tueni (granddaughter)

Michel Murr (Levantine Arabic: ميشال المرّ, romanized: Mīshēl al-Murr, 29 September 1931 – 31 January 2021) was a Lebanese politician and businessman. He served as member of parliament, deputy prime minister and interior minister and was a prominent lawmaker in the northern Metn region.

== Early life and education ==
Michel Murr was born to a Greek Orthodox Christian family in the Matn District village of Bteghrine in 1931. His parents were Elias Murr and Rose Saliba, he had one brother, Gabriel Murr, and four sisters including May Murr.

He studied engineering at St Joseph University and graduated in 1955. He later studied law at the University of Paris II Panthéon-Assas and graduated in 1958.

== Political career ==
Michel Murr ran for a seat in the parliament in 1960, but he lost to Albert Moukheiber. He then went to live in West Africa during much of the 1960s and made a sizable fortune there in the construction industry. He returned to Lebanon and tried to enter the parliament but failed again, while allying with the Syrian Social Nationalist Party, then he was elected to parliament in 1968 by aligning himself with Pierre Gemayel who dominated politics in the predominantly Maronite Christian Metn district. Murr lost his reelection bid in 1972, a defeat which he is said to have blamed on Gemayel. In 1969, he became the minister of post, telegraph and telephone during the premiership of Rashid Karami.

After the 1975–76 civil war, he supported the Phalange Kataeb Regulatory Forces (KRF) militia and its successor, the Lebanese Forces (LF) led by Bashir Gemayel, but not its "Arabist" camp, along with Karim Pakradouni. In the mid-1980s, he supported the pro-Syrian LF faction of Elie Hobeika and participated in the negotiation of the Tripartite Accord, an agreement signed by Hobeika, Druze chieftain Walid Jumblatt and Amal leader Nabih Berri that would have legalized the Syrian presence in Lebanon. Hobeika and Murr were subsequently ousted from the LF leadership by Samir Geagea. They spent the rest of the war years in Syrian-controlled Zahlé, waiting for the day when Damascus would complete its occupation of Lebanon.

In 1979, he held the position of minister of post and housing in Selim Hoss's government and then became the minister of telegraph, post and telephone in the government of Shafik Wazzan in 1980.

Following Syria's takeover of Beirut in October 1990, he was rewarded for his loyalty to the Syrians and assumed the post of interior minister. He was defense minister from December 1990 to October 1992. On 20 March 1991, he survived an assassination attempt, when a car bomb detonated near his motorcade in Antelias, killing eight people and wounding 35 others.

Then he also served as deputy prime minister. When he was in office, he openly cooperated with the Syrian authorities. Murr was appointed interior minister in the 1996 Rafic Hariri cabinet and kept the post in the 1998 Salim Hoss government. Murr continued to serve in this post until 2000 when his son Elias Murr replaced him. Before the general elections of 2000, the Metn district was designed by Syrian and Lebanese authorities to facilitate Murr's election victory. In October 2004, he was elected as deputy speaker of parliament. In the 2005 elections, he was a member of the Change and Reform bloc led by Michel Aoun, but he later left the bloc to become an independent member.

He was the leader of the Metn Bloc that is an independent political party. He last won a seat in the parliament in the 2018 Lebanese general election.

== Personal life ==
He was married to Sylvie Abu Jaoude, and had three children: Elias, Mirna and Lena. His son, Elias, married Karine Lahoud, the daughter of then-army commander and future president Emile Lahoud in 1992, but they later divorced. Michel Murr is the grandfather of Lebanese politician Nayla Tueni and ex-father-in-law of Gebran Tueni, who was married to his daughter Mirna.

== Death ==
On 31 January 2021, the National News Agency (NNA) announced that Murr had died due to complications from COVID-19 during the COVID-19 pandemic. Afterwards, his memorial service was held at the Saint Elias Greek Orthodox Church in Rabieh, and he was later buried in his hometown, Bteghrine.

== See also ==
- January 1986 Lebanese Forces coup
