= Ghassan Tueni =

Lebanese journalist and politician (1926–2012)

- غسان تويني
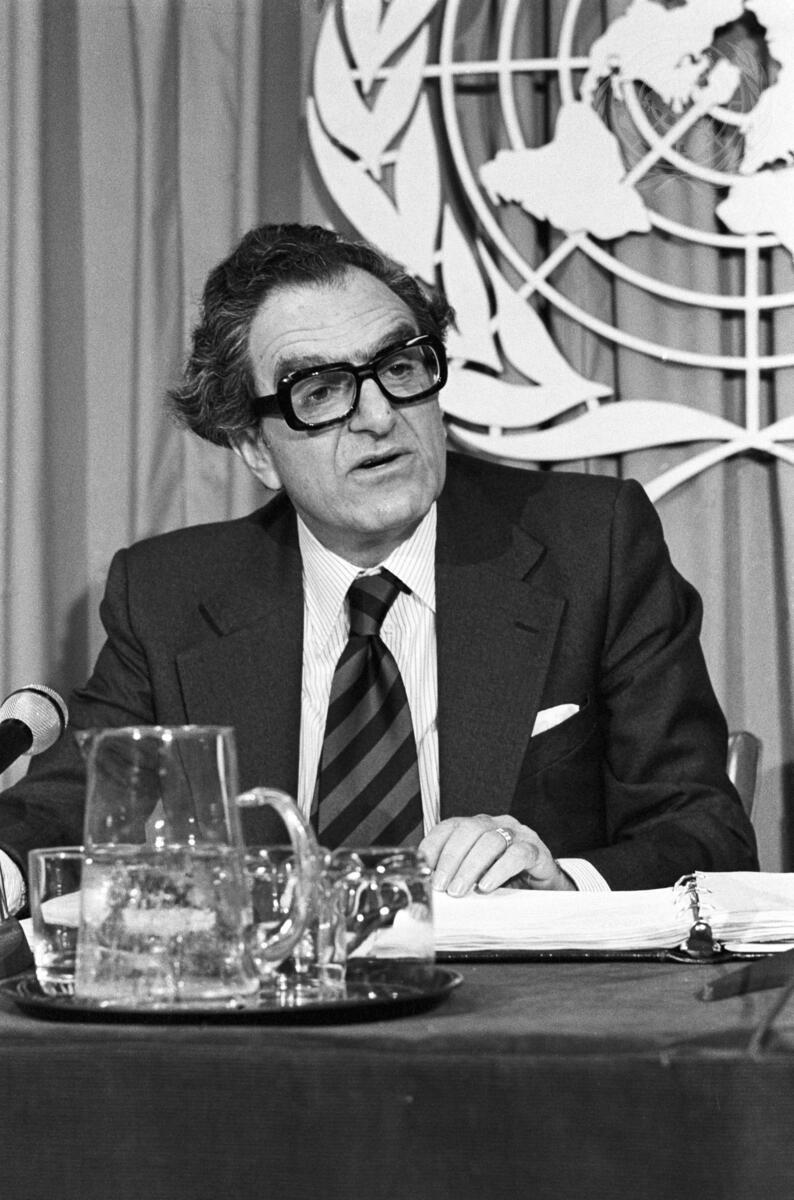
- Ghassan Tueni holding a press conference at UN headquarters in April 1979
- Born: 5 January 1926; Beirut, Lebanon
- Died: 8 June 2012 (aged 86); Beirut, Lebanon
- Resting place: Mar Mitr Cemetery
- Education: Harvard University; American University of Beirut
- Occupations: Journalist, politician, academic, statesman
- Years active: late 1940s–2012
- Spouse(s): Nadia Hamadeh (deceased); Shadia al Khazen
- Children: 3, including Gebran Tueni
- Parent: Gebran Tueni

Ghassan Tueni (Arabic: غسان تويني; 5 January 1926 – 8 June 2012) was a Lebanese journalist, politician and diplomat who headed An Nahar, one of the Arab world's leading newspapers. Some call him "The Dean of Lebanese Journalism".

== Early life ==
Born in Beirut on 5 January 1926 to a Greek Orthodox Christian family of Syrian descent. Ghassan Tueni was the son of Gebran Tueni, the founder and publisher of the daily newspaper An Nahar. His hometown was Beit Mary.

Ghassan Tueni joined the Syrian Social Nationalist Party founded by Antoun Saadeh in the early 1940s. According to Tueni, it was Yusuf al-Khal who recruited him to join the party. While at the American University of Beirut, Tueni was the general executive head of student affairs within the SSNP and later rose to the position of assistant cultural dean of the party. In 1947, he met Antoun Saadeh for the first time in Dhour El Choueir and was blown away by Saadeh's striking charisma. While studying for his master's degree in the United States, Antoun Saadeh was in forced exile, and the two exchanged letters between 1946 and 1947. Later that year, he left the SSNP after it dismissed Yusuf al-Khal, Fayez Sayegh and others.

Tueni made a swift comeback to the SSNP after its party leader was summoned and executed in a trial that took less than twenty four hours by the Lebanese authorities in 1949. Saadeh's execution was dubbed by many as the worst kangaroo court trial in Lebanese legal history. The execution prompted Tueni to write a front-page column in the Nahar newspaper where he hailed Saadeh as a national hero forsaking his life for the national cause and condemning the execution. The article created a widespread political storm that caused much worry among the establishment, and was soon sent to prison. In 1952, Tueni was appointed by the SSNP leadership to represent the party in the Popular Socialist Front led by Kamal Jumblatt which forced the resignation of Lebanese president Bechara El Khoury.

== Education ==
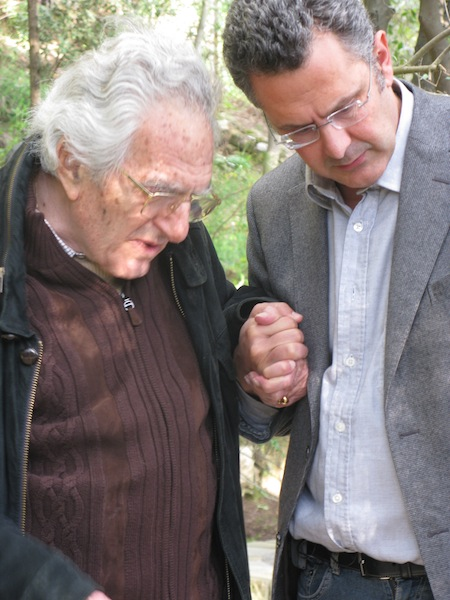
Ghassan Tueni (left) with the director Philippe Aractingi

Tueni studied at the International College (IC) and then, at the American University of Beirut under Charles Malik who was influential in the development of his thoughts. He received a Bachelor of Arts degree in philosophy from the American University of Beirut in 1945. He then went to the United States to study at Harvard University where he received his master's degree in government. He had to abruptly interrupt his Ph.D. studies at Harvard and return to Lebanon to take over the reins of the journal when his father died.

== Career ==
After the sudden death of his father Gebran Tueni, Ghassan, just 22 at the time, returned to Lebanon to continue publishing An Nahar. He became editor-in-chief and publisher of the paper from 1947 to 1999, and from 2003 until his death. He was imprisoned in the 1940s for his objections to censorship. Committed to his father's work, Ghassan developed a new team of journalists, modernising the editorial content and its production. An Nahar was at the time Lebanon's foremost daily and the Arab world's most credible and authoritative newspaper.

He became a member of parliament in 1951, at age 25. Until 1977, he served in different governmental positions, including house speaker, deputy prime minister and minister of the social affairs and labor, industry, information, energy and education. He also served as Lebanon's permanent representative to the United Nations (UN) from September 1977 to September 1982, at the peak of the civil war. During his tenure at the UN, he famously addressed the Security Council on 17 March 1978 with the emotional plea: "Let my people live!". Soon, the UNSC adopted Resolution 425, calling for Israel to immediately withdraw its forces from Lebanon. During the Lebanese Civil War, he was against Bachir Gemayel and confessed lobbying in Washington, D.C. against his presidential election. Ghassan Tueni described the 1989 Taif Agreement as the peace of the others.

After his son Gebran Tueni's assassination, Ghassan Tueni became the candidate for his son's seat in parliament and won the election. In June 2005, he published an article in An Nahar in which he praised Abdul Halim Khaddam's, former vice president of Syria, resignation from the Baath Party. In 2008, following clashes between pro- and anti-Syrian factions in Lebanon, he, along with other PMs, signed the Doha Agreement that ceased Lebanon's worst fighting since the civil war. Tueni's tenure at the parliament lasted until 2009 and his granddaughter Nayla Tueni won the same seat from Beirut.

== Personal life ==
Tueni married Nadia Hamadeh in 1954 who died in 1983 after battling cancer for several years. He was predeceased by all three of his children. His son, the MP and journalist, Gebran Tueni was assassinated in 2005. At his son's funeral, he stood at the altar and pleaded, "Let us bury hatred and revenge along with Gebran". His only daughter, Nayla, died at age 7 from cancer. Makram, his youngest son, was killed in a car crash in Paris in 1987 at age 21. A granddaughter, Nayla, is a journalist and a member of the Lebanese Parliament, like her late father, late Gebran Tueni.

=== Work ===
Ghassan Tueni's writings are extensive. In 1985, his book Une Guerre Pour les Autres (A War of Others) was published. He published another book, Enterrer La Haine Et La Vengeance (Let us bury hate and revenge), in 2009, which he dedicated to his late son Gebran.

=== Awards ===
- Grand Officier, National Order of the Cedar from Lebanon in 1984.

In addition, Tueni was awarded an honorary degree from the American University of Beirut in June 2005. In December 2009, Tueni was given the Lebanese Order of Merit for his achievements in politics. In 2009, he was also the recipient of the Life Time Achievement Award of the Arab Thought Foundation.

Moreover, in 2011, Tueni was awarded an honorary degree from the American University of Science and Technology.

== Death ==
Ghassan Tueni died on 8 June 2012 after a long illness at age 86; he spent the last month of his life at the American University of Beirut Medical Center, in Beirut. He was survived by his second wife, Shadia al Khazen and four granddaughters.

His funeral was held in Beirut on 9 June 2012. The Order of the Cedar was placed on his coffin. He was buried at Mar Mitr Cemetery.

On 9 June 2012, King Abdullah II sent a cable of condolences to the Tueni family as did King Hamad bin Isa Al Khalifa. The other statesmen sent their condolences included François Hollande, Laurent Fabius, and Shiekh Sabah al Ahmed al Sabah.

== Notes ==
- Eulogy for Ghassan Tueni
