= Gebran Andraos Tueni =

Gebran Tueni
- Born: 1890; Beirut, Lebanon
- Died: 1948 (aged 57–58); Santiago, Chile
- Resting place: Saint Dimitrius church
- Occupation: Journalist
- Children: Ghassan Tueni
- Relatives: Gebran Tueni (grandson)

Gebran Andraos Tueni (Arabic: جبران أندراوس تويني; 1890–1948), also written Tueini, was a famous Lebanese journalist and a figure of the Arab Renaissance.

== Biography ==
Born to a Greek Orthodox Christian originally from modern-day Syria, Tueni lived in exile for a while in Paris because of his political views. Returning to Beirut, he founded the Lebanese newspaper Al Ahrar and in 1933, An Nahar daily newspaper that became the largest circulation daily in Lebanon. He was also among the contributors of the literary magazine Al Adib which was established in 1942.

An Nahar that was started on 4 August 1933 as a 4-page tabloid was published by Gebran Tueni as its editor-in-chief and he continued at the head of the influential newspaper until his sudden death in 1948, when editing was taken over by his son Ghassan Tueni, also a prominent journalist, politician, ambassador, and later on Lebanese government minister who continued until 1999.

His grandson Gebran Tueni, the son of Ghassan Tueni, who was named after him became the editor-in-chief of An Nahar after Ghassan Tueni's retirement. The grandson Gebran was also a prominent Lebanese journalist who was elected as a Member of Parliament in Lebanon in 2005, and a fierce critic of the Syrian government and its policies in Lebanon and a figure of March 14 Alliance leading to his assassination on 12 December 2005.

He died on 11th November 1947 in Santiago, Chile where he was serving as Lebanon's minister plenipotentiary.
