= An-Nahar =

Lebanese newspaper

An-Nahar النهار
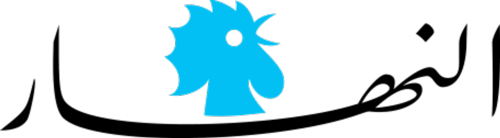

- An-Nahar front page (17 February 2014)
- Type: Daily newspaper
- Format: Print, online
- Founder: Gebran Tueni
- Founded: 4 August 1933; 93 years ago
- Political alignment: Centre-left; Pluralism; Social liberalism
- Language: Arabic French (online only) English (online only)
- Circulation: 45,000 (2012)
- Website: annahar.com

An-Nahar (Arabic: النهار, lit. 'The Day or The Morning') is a leading Arabic-language daily newspaper published in Lebanon. In the 1980s, An-Nahar was described by The New York Times and Time Magazine as the newspaper of record for the entire Arab world.

== History and profile ==
It was launched on 4 August 1933 as a four-page, hand-set paper. The paper, whose staff numbered five, including its founder Gebran Tueni, started with a capital of 50 gold pieces raised from friends, and a circulation of a mere 500 copies. Tueni served as the chief editor of the paper until his death in 1949. His son, Ghassan Tueni, and grandson, also named Gebran Tueni, were subsequent editors and publishers.

Ghassan Tueni was publisher and editor-in-chief of the paper from 1948 to 1999 when he retired. On 19 December 1976, Syrian forces occupied the offices of the daily, prompting Ghassan Tueni to suspend the publication for a while and leave Lebanon for Paris. In 1977, several journalists writing for the daily were detained.

Ghassan's son, Gebran Tueni, was the editor-in-chief of the paper from 2003 to 2005. He was elected to parliament for a Beirut constituency in the 2005 elections, but was assassinated on 12 December 2005 in Mkalles near Beirut in a car bomb explosion. A fiery critic of Syria and its hegemony in Lebanese affairs, Gebran had just returned on the eve of his assassination from Paris where he had been living for fear of assassination. After Gebran's assassination on 12 December 2005, his father Ghassan took over the paper again until his death on 8 June 2012.

Saudi Prince Al-Waleed bin Talal has a stake in the paper. The 2009 Ipsos Stat survey revealed that the paper is the most popular newspaper in Lebanon and one of the five most popular in the Middle East.

An-Nahar is the first Arab paper which regularly covers news on environmental issues. Since 1997, the daily contains a daily page for the environment.

== Views and writers ==
An-Nahar provided a platform for various freethinkers to express their views during the years of the Syrian occupation of Lebanon. The paper can be best expressed as centre-left, though its writers' views range across the political spectrum.

Journalist Charles Glass argues that An-Nahar is Lebanon's equivalent of The New York Times. The New York Times and Time have called it "the newspaper of record for the entire Arab world".

Now defunct Lebanese daily As-Safir was cited as the rival of An-Nahar. In the mid-1990s the latter was described as a moderate and right-of-center paper, while the former as a left-of-center paper. In the 2000s these papers were again supporters of two opposite poles in Lebanon, in that An-Nahar was a supporter of March 14 alliance, whereas As-Safir supported March 8 alliance.

On 11 October 2018 An-Nahar published eight blank pages to pay attention to the difficulties experienced in Lebanese press.

Prominent writers for An-Nahar have included novelist and critic Elias Khoury, who used to edit its weekly cultural supplement Al Mulhaq (which appears on Saturdays) and, until his assassination, historian, journalist and political activist Samir Kassir. Walid Jumblatt worked as a reporter at the daily in the 1970s. Leading caricaturist Pierre Sadek also worked for the daily. Another well-known contributor was Samir Frangieh.

== Circulation and audience ==
In the mid-1990s, the paper had the highest circulation in Lebanon. However, its circulation in the beginning of the 2000s was 45,000 copies, making it the second after As-Safir. In 2012, the Lebanese Ministry of Information stated that An-Nahar has a circulation of 45,000 copies.

The paper's online version was the 13th most visited website for 2010 in the MENA region.

In addition to its native readers in Lebanon, the daily is read by officials, intellectuals and activists outside Lebanon.

== Bans ==
The paper was closed for ten days on 3 May 1961 due to the publication of a cartoon depicting Lebanon as a province of Syria. Syria banned mass circulation of the daily in 2005, while its online edition was not banned. In March 2006, the Damascus correspondent of An-Nahar was charged in Syria with publishing "false information harmful to national security" after writing about the intelligence services of the country.
