= Sassine =

Sassine is the surname of the following people:

- Michel Georges Sassine (1927–2014), Lebanese politician
- Nicole Sassine (born 1989), Canadian sprinter
- Sandra Sassine (born 1979), Canadian fencer
- Williams Sassine (1944–1997), Guinean novelist

== See also ==
- Sassine Square in Beirut, Lebanon
