= List of places in Beirut =

This is a list of places in Beirut, the capital city of Lebanon. It covers neighborhoods within the city and its suburbs, landmark buildings and monuments, educational institutions, and public parks.

== Beirut neighborhoods ==
City of Beirut

- Badaro
- Achrafieh
- Beirut Central District
- Hamra Street
- Mazraa District
- Raouché, includes Corniche Beirut

Beirut suburbs

- Bourj Hammoud
- Bourj el-Barajneh
- Dahieh
  - Chyah
  - Haret Hreik
- Shatila refugee camp

== Landmark buildings and monuments ==
- Grand Serail
- Martyrs' Square, Beirut
- National Museum of Beirut

== Educational institutions ==
- International College (IC)
- American University of Beirut (AUB)
- American University of Science and Technology (AUST)
- Business and Computer University (BCU)
- Beirut Arab University (BAU)
- Haigazian University (HU)
- Université Saint-Esprit de Kaslik (USEK)
- Université Saint-Joseph de Beyrouth (USJ)
- Hariri Canadian University (HCU)
- Lebanese University (LU)
- Lebanese American University (LAU)
- Lebanese International University (LIU)
- Middle East Canadian Academy of Technology (MECAT)
- Beirut Art Studio (Painting school)

== Parks ==
- Gibran Khalil Gibran Garden
- Horsh Beirut
- Jesuit Garden
- René Moawad Garden
- Saint Nicolas Garden
- Sioufi Garden

== See also ==
- Tourist attractions in Beirut
