= EDZ =

EDZ may refer to:

- EDZ, code for Chrysler 2.4 and 2.4 Turbo car engines
- EDZ Irigary Bridge, United States historic place
- Electricité de Zahlé, collaborator with the Lebanese Center for Energy Conservation
- European Dead Zone, area in Destiny (video game series)
- Eugene—Denio Zone, part of the Brothers Fault Zone
