= Joe Kodeih =

Lebanese writer, actor and director

Joe Kodeih (born September 3, 1967 in Achrafieh, Beirut) is a writer, actor and director. He was the first writer and director from the Arab world to perform on an Off-Broadway stage at Lamama ETC in 2003 with a play titled The Middle Beast. The play was acclaimed by the audience and rerun at Monnot theater in Beirut in 2008, when the writer received many threats for its content. Joe's plays have been performed all over Europe, the Middle East, and Africa. One of his plays, "Son prénom malgre lui," was published at Lansman editions in Belgium.

== Education ==
Kodeih obtained his B.A. in Dramatic Arts in 1995, an M.A. in Directing in 1998, and an M.A. in Drama Theory in 2020, all from the Saint Joseph University in Lebanon.

== Body Of Work ==
- 2020: "Emm El-Kell," socio-political monologue, written, performed and produced, Beirut
- 2019: "The Middle Beast," socio-political satire, written, directed and produced, Beirut, Tunis
- 2018: "Abou el-Ghadab," monologue, written, performed and produced, Beirut
- 2017: "Btetol," based on "Petits Crimes Conjugaux of Schmidt," adapted, directed and produced, Beirut
- 2016: "La Peau d’Elisa," written by Carole Frechette, directed and produced, Beirut; "Les Liaisons Dangereuses," written by Choderlos de Laclos, adapted, directed and produced, Beirut
- 2015: "Daddy," monologue, written, performed and produced, Beirut, Paris
- 2014: "Rima," tragicomedy monologue, written, directed and produced, Beirut; "Michel wu Samir," political satire, written, directed and produced, Beirut
- 2013: "Le Jocon," monologue, written, performed and produced, Beirut, Paris
- 2012: "Film Cinama," monologue, written, performed and produced, Beirut, Paris
- 2011: "ANA," monologue, written, performed and produced, Beirut, Paris, Abu Dhabi, Kuwait, Luxembourg
- 2010: "Bala Mazeh," comedy TV show on LBCI, written and produced, Beirut; "Ashrafieh," monologue, written, performed and produced, Beirut, Paris, Dubai
- 2009: "Hayet el Jagal Sobeh," monologue, written, performed & produced, Beirut, Dubai, Paris, Luxembourg
- 2008: "The Middle Beast," socio-political satire, written, directed and produced, Beirut
- 2006: "El Bagno," drama, written, directed and produced, Beirut, Tunis
- 2003: "The Middle Beast," socio-political satire, written and directed, first Lebanese work to stage Off- Broadway at Lamama ETC. New York
- 2002: "Mamooshka," surrealist play, written, staged at Labalsamine Theater in Brussels
- 2001: "Aal Yamine," post-war play, written, directed and produced, Beirut, Paris
- 2000: "Son Prénom Malgré Lui," post-war play, written, published by Lansman publishers in Belgium, Staged in Brussels, Geneva, Senegal, Côte d'Ivoire; "Al-Takht," satire, written, directed and produced, Beirut
- 1999: "Europa," experimental play, written and directed, Bologna, Marseille; "Matar Charles De Gaulle," monologue, written and directed, Beirut
- 1998: "Kiss of the Spider Woman," written by Manuel Puig, adapted and directed, Beirut
- 1997: "Scènes d’amour," retrospective on theatre history, written and directed, Beirut, Avignon Festival
- 1996: "Pascal and Descartes," written by Jean Claude Briseville, directed, Beirut
- 1995: "La Soirée des Proverbes," written by George Schéhadé, directed, Beirut
