= Geothermal energy in Lebanon =

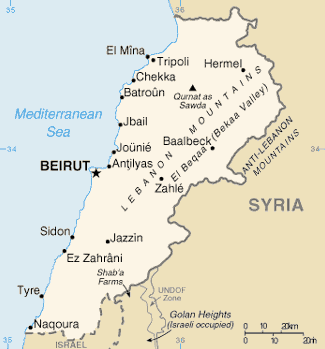
Location

Geothermal energy in Lebanon is a branch of the energy industry, expanding quickly over the last several years. According to a UNDP assessment (CEDRO project), the geothermal energy theoretically available in Lebanon is 10^{9} GWh or 70,000 times the amount of energy needed in Lebanon per year although the technologies at the time of study allow for the extraction of only 10% of that amount, i.e. 10^{8} GWh or 7,000 times the yearly energy demand of Lebanon. Additionally, the study concludes that for reasons regarding the safety of EGS technologies, only hydrothermal techniques could be appropriate for Lebanon. These techniques theoretically allow for the extraction of only 1.2 . 10^{5} GWh. The CEDRO project proposes "an optimistic but realistic scenario" for the implementation of this technology that would allow for the production of 0.2% of the total energy demand for 2025 via geothermal means. The study includes a geothermal atlas for the country and estimates the current overall potential of geothermal heat and power generation.

== Geothermal power ==
Lebanese energy and water ministry intend to meet 0.2 percent target of Lebanon’s total power energy needs with geothermal sources by 2025.

== Geothermal for cooling and heating ==
=== Implementation ===
Lebanese private sector and UNDP are beginning to design and install high performance ground source heating pump aiming to provide heating, cooling and hot water demand from the ground heat sink. These implementations allow the beneficiaries to save big amount of energy on cooling and heating.

=== Quality and cost efficiency ===
Geothermal heat pumps use much less energy than conventional heating systems and have the best indoor air quality. Units are very smooth, quiet in operation and very reliable comparable to a refrigerator since the units are not subjected to wear and tear caused by snow, rain and sun. Thus the Bank of Lebanon in cooperation with the IBL bank offer loans of 0% interest rate and up to 15 years repayment period. In addition, a grant is offered by the European Community.

== See also ==
- Lebanese Center for Energy Conservation
- Energy in Lebanon
