= Lebanese Center for Energy Conservation =

Lebanese Center for Energy Conservation (LCEC)
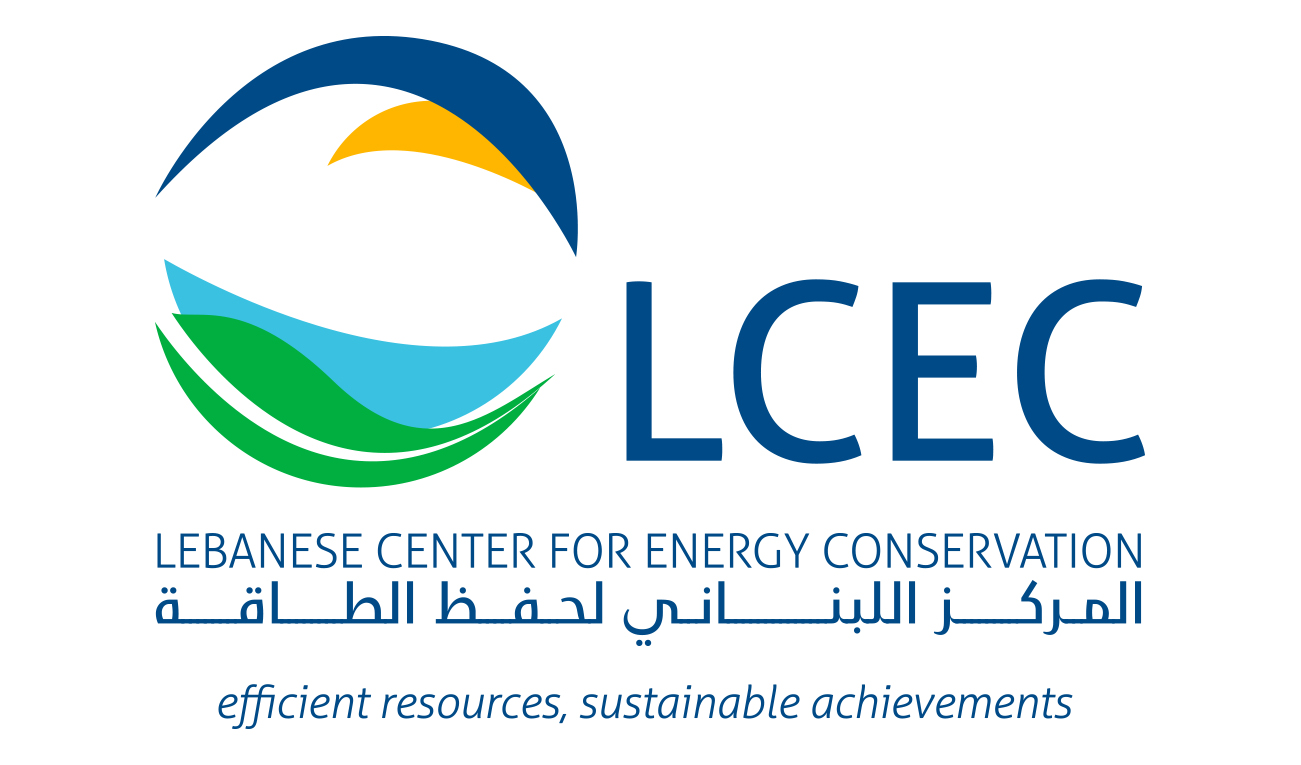
- Formation: 2002
- Headquarters: Beirut (Lebanon)
- President/Director: Pierre El Khoury
- Website: http://lcec.org.lb

The Lebanese Center for Energy Conservation (LCEC) is the national energy agency for Lebanon, working within the Lebanese Ministry of Energy and Water (MEW) in areas related to energy efficiency, renewable energy, and green buildings through technical assistance, policy development, and national energy initiatives. LCEC originated in 2005 as a joint project between MEW and the United Nations Development Programme (UNDP) Lebanon. LCEC has been financially and administratively independent since 2011.

== History ==
In 2002, MEW and United Nations Development Programme (UNDP) signed an agreement to create a new project called "Cross-sectoral energy efficiency and removal of barriers to ESCO operation." The project was co-funded by the Global Environment Facility (GEF) and MEW under the direct management of UNDP Lebanon. A main objective of this project was to create a national energy agency for Lebanon. The project's team started its operation in early 2005. Gradually, the project name changed to LCEC.

LCEC was consolidated as an independent technical national center in the Memorandum of Understanding that signed between MEW and UNDP on 18 June 2007. GEF and UNDP extended their support to the LCEC.

At the 2009 Copenhagen Climate Summit, Lebanon voluntarily pledged to increase its renewable energy shares to 12% by 2020.

In 2013, the financial and administrative support of GEF and UNDP to LCEC came to an end. During that same year, LCEC received its first financial support from MEW. The MEW support ensured the sustainability of the center for a minimum of 5 years. LCEC also receives support from the European Union through a contract signed with the Central Bank of Lebanon.

== Policy Development ==
=== National Energy Efficiency Action Plan ===
LCEC developed the National Energy Efficiency Action Plan 2011–2015 for Lebanon (NEEAP) to achieve the national target of 12% renewable energy share by 2020. NEEAP summarizes all national objectives, programmes and policies in 14 initiatives in the energy efficiency and renewable energy sectors. The initiatives of the NEEAP are the following:

- Initiative 1: Towards Banning the Import of Incandescent Lamps to Lebanon
- Initiative 2: Adoption of the Energy Conservation Law and Institutionalization of the Lebanese Center for Energy Conservation (LCEC) as the National Agency for Lebanon
- Initiative 3: Promotion of Decentralization Power Generation by PV and Wind Applications in the Residential and Commercial Sectors
- Initiative 4: Solar Water Heaters for Buildings and Institutions
- Initiative 5: Design and implementation of a national strategy for efficient and economic public street Lighting in Lebanon
- Initiative 6: Electricity Generation from Wind Power
- Initiative 7: Electricity Generation from Solar Energy
- Initiative 8: Hydro Power for Electricity Generation
- Initiative 9: Geothermal energy in Lebanon, Waste to Energy, and Other Technologies
- Initiative 10: Building Code for Lebanon
- Initiative 11: Financing Mechanisms and Incentive
- Initiative 12: Awareness and Capacity Building
- Initiative 13: Paving the Way for Energy Audit and ESCO Business
- Initiative 14: Promotion of Energy Efficient Equipment

=== NEEAP 2012–2020, NREAP and RES ===
LCEC is currently updating and developing the NEEAP 2015–2020 while preparing the Renewable Energy Strategy (RES) and the National Renewable Energy Action Plan (NREAP) for Lebanon. The Lebanese NEEAP was prepared in conformance with the Arab EE guideline (based on the EU directive 2006/32/EC on energy end-use efficiency and energy service) and Lebanon was the first Arab country to officially adopt such plan.

== Pilot projects ==
=== 2006: 500 Solar Water Heaters ===
The Chinese government donated 500 solar water heaters to be installed in the liberated areas in South Lebanon. LCEC was assigned by MEW to support its installation both technically and financially. The workload consisted of handling all project logistics, hosting Chinese experts to conduct an intensive training workshop, and assisting in the selection of beneficiaries. Additionally, $112,500 was raised to cater for the installation of the units.

As a result of the war in Lebanon, 200 solar units were destroyed. LCEC has followed up with the Chinese Embassy to provide Lebanon with similar donations due to its direct results on the beneficiaries.

==== Project information ====
- Date of implementation: Q3 2006
- Donation: 500 solar water heaters
- Type of donation: in-kind
- Application type: evacuated tube solar water heaters
- Beneficiaries: 417 residences and public health centers
- Areas covered: liberated areas in South Lebanon
- Role of LCEC: technical agency

==== Achievements ====
- Collection area: 1,270 sq. meters
- Annual energy production: 1,018 MWh
- Annual energy cost saving (consumer side): $71,000
- Annual energy cost saving (EDL side): $326,000
- Annual GHG emissions reduction: 848 tons CO_{2}

==== Implemented by ====
- Kypros
- Falcon Win Trading
- Ghaddar Industry
- Tfaily Solar
- Mihsen Reda Co.

=== 2008: Solar Water Heaters for Not-for-profit Facilities ===
In 2008, the United Nations Development Program, through its Energy and Environment Programme, with the funding of the Swedish International Development Agency (SIDA), launched a pilot project to install solar water heaters at public–NGO facilities in selected damaged areas of Beirut, Bekaa and South Lebanon due to July 2006 war. Under the supervision of the Lebanese Center for Energy Conservation (LCEC), the project consisted of installing 93 individual (natural circulation) solar water heaters, and 11 collective (forced circulation) solar water heaters, covering a total of 1,040 square meters of collection area. The solar water heating units were executed by three qualified firms through an international bid, and divided into five lots.

==== Project information ====
- Date of implementation: Q1 2008
- Donation: 104 solar water heating systems (11 Collective and 93 Individual)
- Type of donation: cash
- Application type: individual and collective solar water heating systems
- Beneficiaries: 104 hospitals, orphanages, elderly centers, health care, Red Cross, and civil defense centers
- Areas covered: Bekaa, South, and Beirut Suburbs
- Role of LCEC: administrator

==== Achievements ====
- Collection area: 1,040 square meters
- Annual energy production: 1,017 MWh
- Annual energy cost saving (consumer side): $81,000
- Annual energy cost saving (EDL side): $324,000
- Annual GHG emissions reduction: 744 tons CO_{2}

==== Implemented by ====
- Aquatherma Engineering
- Kypros Solar
- Dawtec

=== CFL Pilot Project in Niha, Bekaa ===
Based on a collaboration agreement signed between LCEC and Electricité de Zahlé (EDZ), EDZ installed around 1,048 Compact Fluorescent Lamps (CFLs) in the village of Niha in the Bekaa area, completely free-of-charge. The 1,048 CFLs were purchased by LCEC and the installation was offered free-of-charge by EDZ as an in-kind contribution.

The project aimed to reduce electricity consumption among participating households and promote energy-efficient lighting. The project also aimed to reduce greenhouse gas emissions associated with inefficient lighting.

Following a site survey done by EDZ, LCEC supplied around 1,048 CFL's of different sizes to EDZ with a total cost not exceeding $2,500.

Due to the importance of this pilot project, the event was covered by the media in every aspect. In fact, a press release was distributed to the main newspapers in town, namely Annahar, Assafir, Al Anwar, and Al Mustaqbal. In addition, the project was covered by two main television stations in Lebanon, namely LBCI and NTV.

Recently, LCEC in collaboration with EDZ has worked on developing a complete study report on the success of this project, a year after its completion.

=== Chinese Government Grant – Phase 2 ===
After the success of the 500 solar water heaters donated by the People's Republic of China and subsequent to the Israeli's attacks in July 2006 leading to the destruction of 200 of units earlier that year, the LCEC and the Ministry of Energy & Water (MEW) have been closely coordinating with the Chinese government to proceed with a phase 2 grant that will include 600 solar water heaters of similar capacity and type of phase 1 (208 L tank capacity and 28 glass tubes).

==== Project information ====
- Date of Initiation: Q1 2010
- Donation: 600 solar water heaters (200 to replace damaged of Phase 1 plus 400 new installations)
- Type of donation: in-kind
- Application type: evacuated tube solar water heaters
- Beneficiaries: 417 residences and public health centers
- Areas covered: residences and non-profit facilities
- Role of LCEC: technical agency

==== Projected achievements ====
- Collection area: 1,524 square meters
- Annual energy production: 1,221 MWh
- Annual energy cost saving (consumer side): $97,000
- Annual energy cost saving (EDL side): $445,000
- Annual GHG emissions reduction: 1,017 tons CO_{2}

=== Beirut River Solar Snake ===
The "Beirut River Solar Snake" (BRSS) is the 1st pilot project in Lebanon to produce electricity from solar energy. It was launched by the Ministry of Energy and Water (MEW) in 2013 and is under the supervision and management of LCEC. The project will be extended over a distance of 6.5 km on the top of the Beirut River and have 10 MW installed capacity to be the first grid connected solar farm that seeks to generate and supply EDL with clean energy. The project will also have a technical building. The implementation of the first phase has an installed capacity of 1 MW extending over an area of 16,000 m2. The cost of the 1st phase of the project is $3.1 Million (with a budget of $4 million) and is completely financed by MEW. The execution of the first phase started in July 2014 and is now completed.

=== Public Street Lighting ===
LCEC was engaged in the public street lighting project and managed the installation of 500 solar street lights at the end of December 2014 through a grant by the Chinese Government in the Dora, Jounieh, Cornet Chehwan and Batroun areas.

=== French FASEP Initiative for Solar Photovoltaic Educational Platform ===
The "Educational and Demonstration Platform for Renewable Energies in Lebanon" project is a joint initiative between the French company Transénergie and the Ministry of Energy and Water represented by LCEC with the direct support of the Industrial Research Institute (IRI) and UNDP Lebanon. It aims at the installation of an educational platform to be used by researchers, educational institutions, university students, as well as professionals in the solar photovoltaic sector.

=== Global Solar Water Heating Market Transformation and Strengthening Initiative ===
A main component of LCEC's work is the GEF-funded project "Global Solar Water Heating Market Transformation and Strengthening Initiative" aiming at the installation of around 190,000 square meters of solar water heaters (SWHs) during the timeline of the project from 2010 until the end of 2014. Another aim of the project is to help the market reach a total annual sale of 50,000 m2 and the installation of 1,050,000 square meters of SWHs capacity by 2020. To achieve these goals, the project worked on pilot installation of solar water heating, training engineers and technicians, advertisements and marketing, and all other aspects that affect the solar water heating market growth.

Till July 2014, a total of 5,878 installations were approved for SWH loans, and 49.63% of which benefited from the $200 subsidy. In total, 33,239 systems were sold between 2012 and 2013.

Moreover, LCEC provides both the public and private sector with expert advice, finance and accreditation, develops energy efficiency standards and labels, and provides national energy database indicators.

=== ESCO Companies ===
Since 2001, a nationwide program on energy audits for medium and large consuming facilities was initiated. This was a project financed by the Global Environment Facility (GEF), managed by the United Nations Development Programme (UNDP), and called "Lebanon Cross Sectoral Energy Efficiency and Removal of Barriers to ESCO Operation". The initial period 2002–2004 saw delays in project implementation; consequently, the project was essentially restarted with a new project team in 2005 and was operational until the end of 2009. The project was mainly targeting the high combined consumption of energy in industrial plants and buildings, where the potential for energy savings is important and promising. In 2006, LCEC aimed and worked on creating a market for ESCOs (Energy Service Companies that offer energy efficiency improvement services) where the end user can request a specialized ESCO to conduct an energy audit.

Over 125 audits were completed within the project, mostly for large facilities.

Only one ESCO was operational at the beginning of the programme. In 2010 only 8 ESCOs where active, nowadays more than 30 are available and the market is still expanding rapidly. To further support the growth of the ESCOs market, LCEC launched an initiative in NEAAP called "Paving the Way for Energy Audit and ESCO Business". The purpose of this initiative is to support the development of the ESCO working in the energy audit business and provide them with the suitable financial, fiscal and technical incentives to remove all the obstacles hindering their growth. To support this initiative, LCEC has offered periodical trainings, workshops and seminars on energy audit activities and procedures to technician, engineers, bankers and to all those involved in the field. The ESCO pre-qualification programme was launched by LCEC by 2014 in order to regulate the market and have a recommended list of companies for potential projects.

== Financing ==
LCEC is the technical partner of the Central Bank of Lebanon (BDL) in the review and evaluation of all technical applications to low-interest energy loans submitted to BDL, through the National Energy Efficiency and Renewable Energy Action (NEEREA). NEEREA allows private sector entities to apply to low-interest subsidized loans for any type of EE and/or RE projects, with a ceiling of $20 million. The European Union is a partner of NEEREA, offering a grant over a share of the investment cost of maximum $5 million, 15% for nonsubsidized sectors and 5% for subsidized sectors.

By January 2015, more than 200 projects were approved under NEEREA, with a total amount of more than $200 Million. 60% of the projects were for solar photovoltaic while 82% of loans amount was for green buildings.
