= Farès Boueiz =

Lebanese politician (born 1955)

Minister of Foreign Affairs and Emigrants
- In office 1990 – May 1992
- Prime Minister: Omar Karami
- Preceded by: Selim Hoss
- Succeeded by: Nasri Maalouf
- In office October 1992 – 1998
- Prime Minister: Rafic Hariri
- Preceded by: Nasri Maalouf
- Succeeded by: Selim Hoss

Minister of Environment
- In office 2003 – 7 September 2004
- Prime Minister: Rafic Hariri
- Succeeded by: Michel Musa (acting)

Personal details
- Born: 15 January 1955 (age 71) Zouk Mikael, Lebanon
- Spouse: Zalfa Hrawi
- Education: Saint Joseph University; Jean Moulin University

Farès Boueiz (Arabic: فارس بويز, born 15 January 1955) is a Lebanese jurist who served as a foreign minister for two terms as well as an environment minister.

== Early life and education ==
On 15 January 1955, Boueiz was born into a Maronite family in Zouk Mikael. In 1977 he obtained a law degree from Saint Joseph University in Lebanon, and in 1978 he specialized in corporate and international law at Jean Moulin University in Lyon, France.

== Career ==
Boueiz is a lawyer by profession. In 1989 and 1990, he was appointed the personal representative of Elias Hrawi, President of Lebanon, to France, Syria and the Vatican.

From 1990 to 1992, he served as foreign minister from when he left office for a few months following the general elections in 1992 and was temporarily replaced by Nasri Maalouf in the post. It was Boueiz who participated in a first official meeting with the PLO's Farouk Qaddumi, head of the group's political department, in mid-May 1991 after a long period.

Boueiz continued to serve as foreign minister from 1992 to 1998 in the cabinet led by Prime Minister Rafic Hariri. Hariri and he had a tensed relationship due to Hariri's interventions to foreign policy. When Boueiz was in office, his father-in-law, Elias Hrawi, was the President of Lebanon. In 1998 Salim Hoss succeeded Boueiz as foreign minister.

In 2003, Boueiz was appointed environment minister to the cabinet led by Rafic Hariri, replacing Michel Musa in the post. Boueiz was an independent member of the cabinet. On 7 September 2004, he resigned from office protesting the constitutional amendment to extend the term of Émile Lahoud as president. Three more ministers also resigned on the same day, namely Marwan Hamadeh, Ghazi Aridi and Abdullah Farhat. These four ministers were also among the members of the parliament who voted against the extension of Lahoud's term.

The state minister Michel Musa replaced Boueiz as acting environment minister. Boueiz was among the potential candidates for the presidency after Émile Lahoud's first term in 2004.

Boueiz served as a member of the Lebanese Parliament, representing Kesrouan until 2005. He was again one of the contenders for the presidency of Lebanon after Lahoud in 2007.

In the general elections in 2009, Boueiz was not on the list of the March 14 alliance.

== Views ==
During his second term as foreign minister, Boueiz overtly cooperated with the Syrian authorities. However, in 2001, he objected the accusations of Syrian Defense Minister Mustafa Tlass regarding Patriarch Sfeir. On the other hand, Boueiz was skeptical about the peace accord signed by Israel and the PLO in 1993, and argued that Palestinian refugees should not settle in Lebanon due to sensitive demographic balance between native Christians and Muslims in the country. During talks with Egyptian diplomats in Rome in early April 1998, Boueiz argued that the Nazis' approach against Jewish people was based on political reasons stating "they have behaved arrogantly like the chosen people of God."

== Personal life ==
Boueiz married Zalfa Hrawi in 1985 and is the son-in-law of Elias Hrawi.
