= Nasri Maalouf =

Lebanese politician

Minister of Foreign Affairs and Emigrants
- In office May 1992 – October 1992
- Prime Minister: Omar Karami
- Preceded by: Farès Boueiz
- Succeeded by: Farès Boueiz

Personal details
- Born: May 7, 1911 al-Mashrah, Beirut, Ottoman Syria
- Died: April 2, 2005 (aged 93) Abu Dhabi, UAE

Nasri Maalouf (Arabic: نصري معلوف) (May 7, 1911 – April 2, 2005) was a Lebanese politician. He was a Melkite Greek Catholic, and was known as a moderate and peacemaker in Lebanese politics.

Nasri Maalouf was also a prominent lawyer, who mediated one of his most important cases, the one involving the prosecution of Nizar Halabi's assassination.

Maalouf was born in al-Mashrah, Beirut, in modern-day Lebanon. He was educated in Syria. He was a signer of the Lebanese constitution and the Taif Accord. He was the Minister of Finance from November 1956 to July 1957.

He was a long-time member of parliament from Beirut- first elected in 1968 alongside Michel Sassine- and served in the cabinet several times, including as foreign minister for a few months in 1992, as well as defense minister from 1973 to 1974, and Minister of Justice. Shortly before his death, he was appointed to be a member of a council of elders which supervised parliamentary elections in June 2005.
