= Sassine Square =

Town square in Beirut, Lebanon

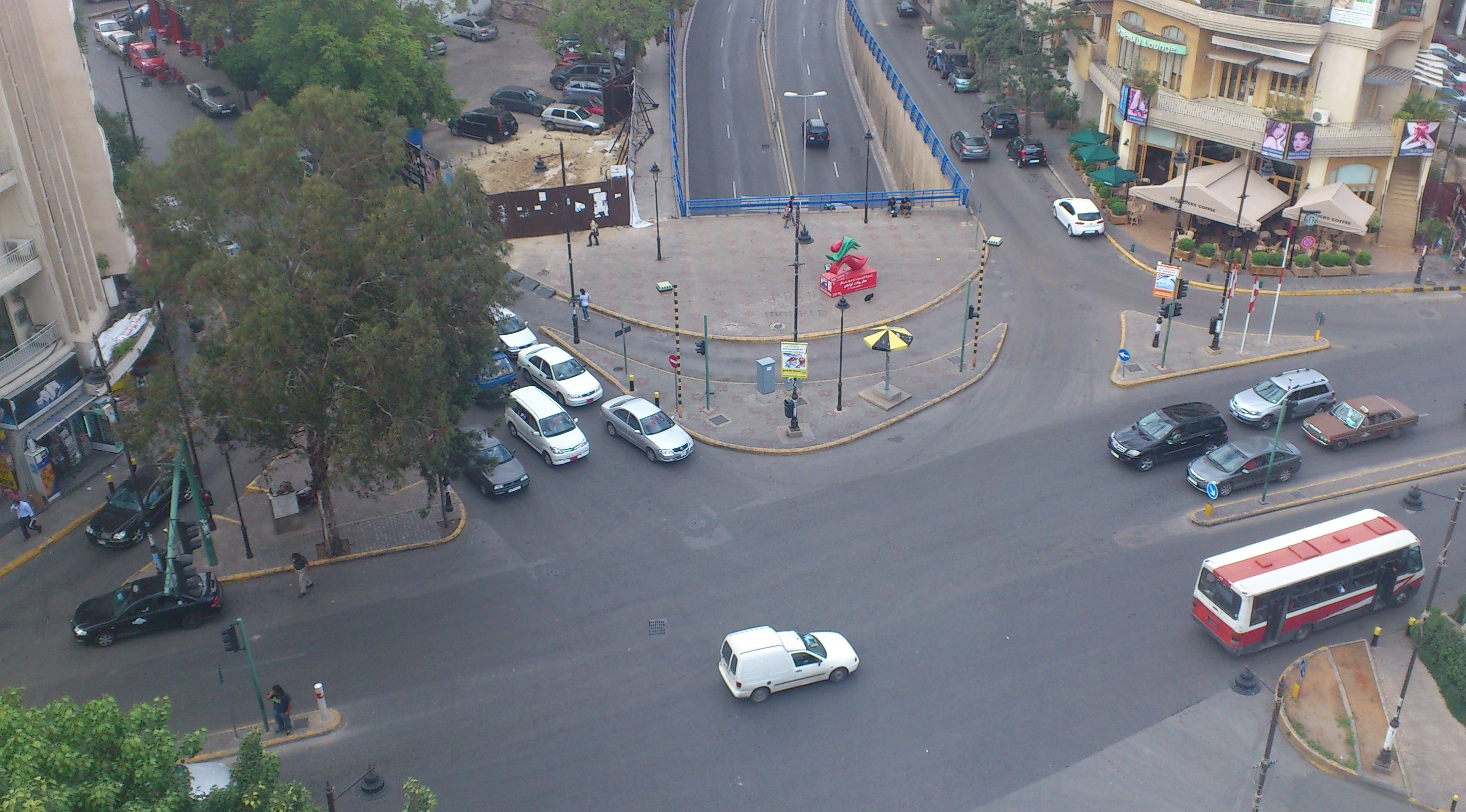
Sassine Square in 2011

Sassine Square (Arabic: ساحة ساسين) is a city square in Beirut, Lebanon. It is located in the Achrafieh district.

Historically and popularly named after a prominent family of Achrafieh, the works for Sassine Square started in 1967 and the tunnel underneath was completed in 1990. The square was officially inaugurated in the early '90s under the auspices of President Elias Hrawi, Prime-Minister Rafic Hariri, Member of Parliament Michel Sassine, and the Municipal Council of Beirut City .

On 19 October 2012, a car bomb exploded in an alley leading to Sassine street next to Sassine Square killing 8 including Wissam al-Hassan and injuring 78.
