= Sioufi Garden =

Public Garden in Beirut, Lebanon

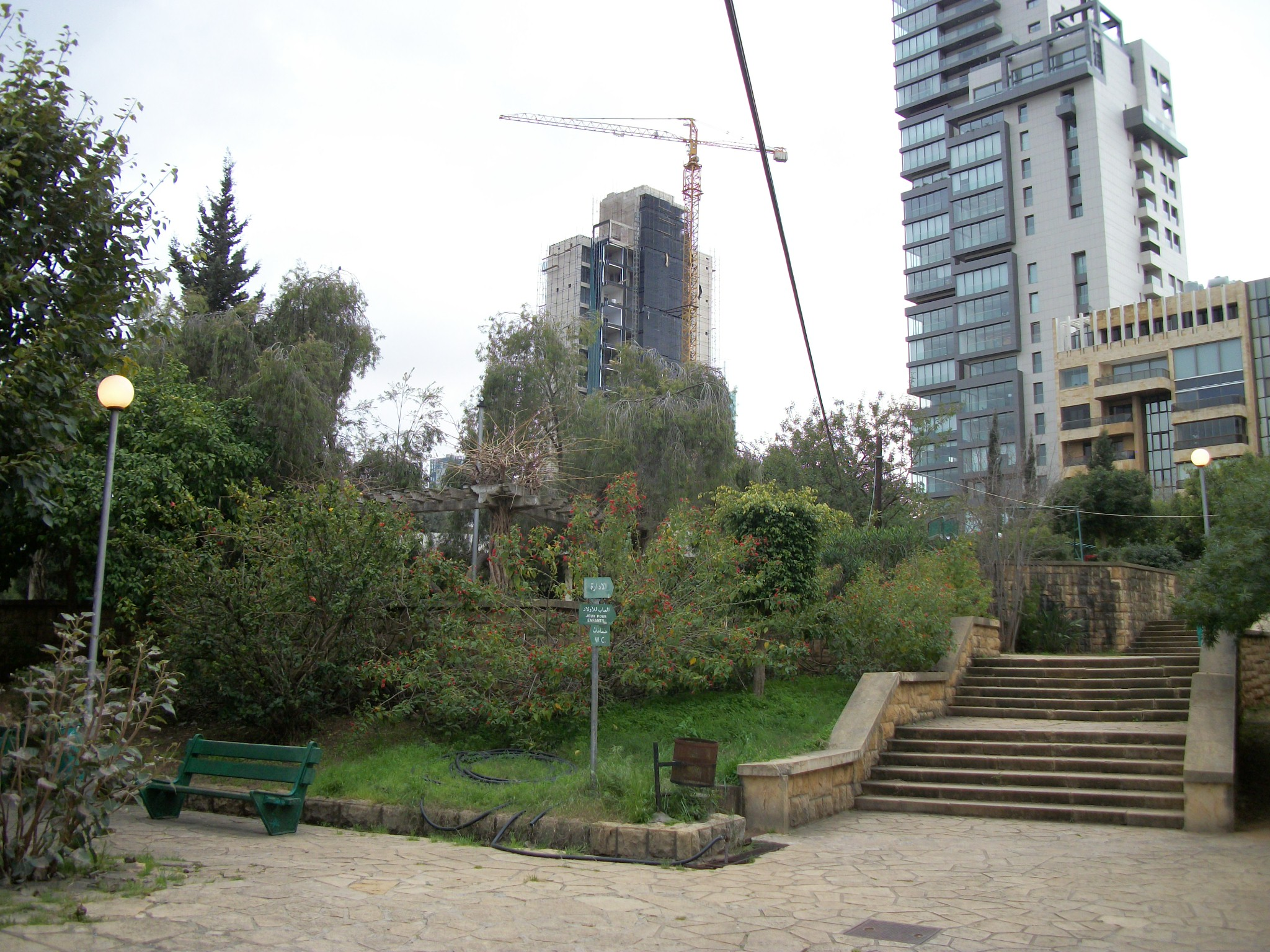
The Sioufi Garden in Achrafieh District, Beirut

The Sioufi Garden (in Arabic حديقة السيوفي) is a public garden in the Achrafieh District of Beirut in Lebanon. The garden overlooks Avenue President Émile Lahoud, the Beirut River, and the summits of Mount Lebanon. The area of the garden is 20,000 square meters.

== History ==
The garden took its name from its location in the Sioufi quarter, which is situated on the eastern edge of the Achrafieh hill. The quarter took its name from the Sioufi furniture factories that were built in the area in 1910; as service for the public, the owners of the factories maintained a garden open to the public.

== Public Art ==
In 1997 Ashkal Alwan - The Lebanese Association for Plastic Arts, in partnership with the Lebanese Ministry of Culture, collaborated with ten artists in order to permanently install their works in Sioufi Garden. The permanent installation's goal was to nurture and educate the public on the cultural significance of art and public spaces as well as allowing the future generation access to creative work. This access allowed the public and nature to alter the artworks to best suit their needs such as Charles Khoury's The Guard has had his wings lowered for children to climb on. This is one of the many possibilities of interaction with the artwork for future and past generations with a list below :

- Marwan Rechmaoui's sphere depends on the height of your knees. If it is twice the height of your knees, it is a perfect hiding spot in a game of Hide and Seek, if it is three times the height of knees, you have a chance of becoming Atlas as you can position yourself in a similar manner as depicted in Classical art. If you have outgrown this period, which is usually associated with the introduction of democracy, it can serve as a surface to sit on top of unless it is too hot. In this manner you have a vantage point of all your surroundings except what is under your knees.
- Carma Naim Barakat's cement sculpture consists of five human-like figures in a formation similar to the Stonehenge. The smooth surfaces are usually used by park visitors to sit on as this sculpture does not only provide a seating position but also provides a table top surface, that park benches lack in Souifi Garden. The initial intention of the artist for the table top surfaces is to embody the abstracted form of human heads.
- Similarly Hommage à Saint-Exupéry, intended to allow adults to meditate and children to be inspired, retains its function by the visitors repurposing its visual metaphor into chaises longue to have a resting place to do such activities.
- According to the artist Houssam Hatoum, Brahma represents the Creator of the Universe, days of the Universe that have past and the days that are left. It has also served as an inspiration for the Souifi Heights right behind it and now represents that as well. While the park was maintained, it was in a plot of grass with no immediate trees alongside it. It formed the only shaded spot in this grass field and was used by couples as its width was perfect to serve as two back rests. Currently it is slightly obscured between multiple trees and generally unused so Brahma has resorted to its initial form of a sculpture.
- Imad Issa's Bird Lying on the Floor cannot be found in the park.
- Najoua Nahas' Agora consisting of four concrete structure if different sizes and shapes to allow a playful shadow display has been augmented by birds lying in its crevasses. The waves structures allow a perfect place for birds to land adding numerous kinetic shadows.
- The Guard has turned into the Lady Bird and the Lady Bird has turned into the Guard through interventions of park visitors. The Guard was supposed to protect the green plot of land as a scarecrow does according to the artist, however children were never scared of it and climbed on top of the Guard all day to the point that the green plot was turned into a play ground. The Lady Bird's a sculpture that also functioned as a rotating platform for children does not rotate anymore but instead rests and protects the plot of land underneath it.
- The Three Gates in reference to the garden's three gates, the union of the body, mind, and spirit, and all of the holy trinities according to the artist has been submerged by soil and paved by incidents of tripping, falling, and injuries caused while traversing the journey through the Three Gates. It now has a footpath that hides less than a quarter of the sculpture to facilitate the experience of guest visitors.

== Image gallery ==
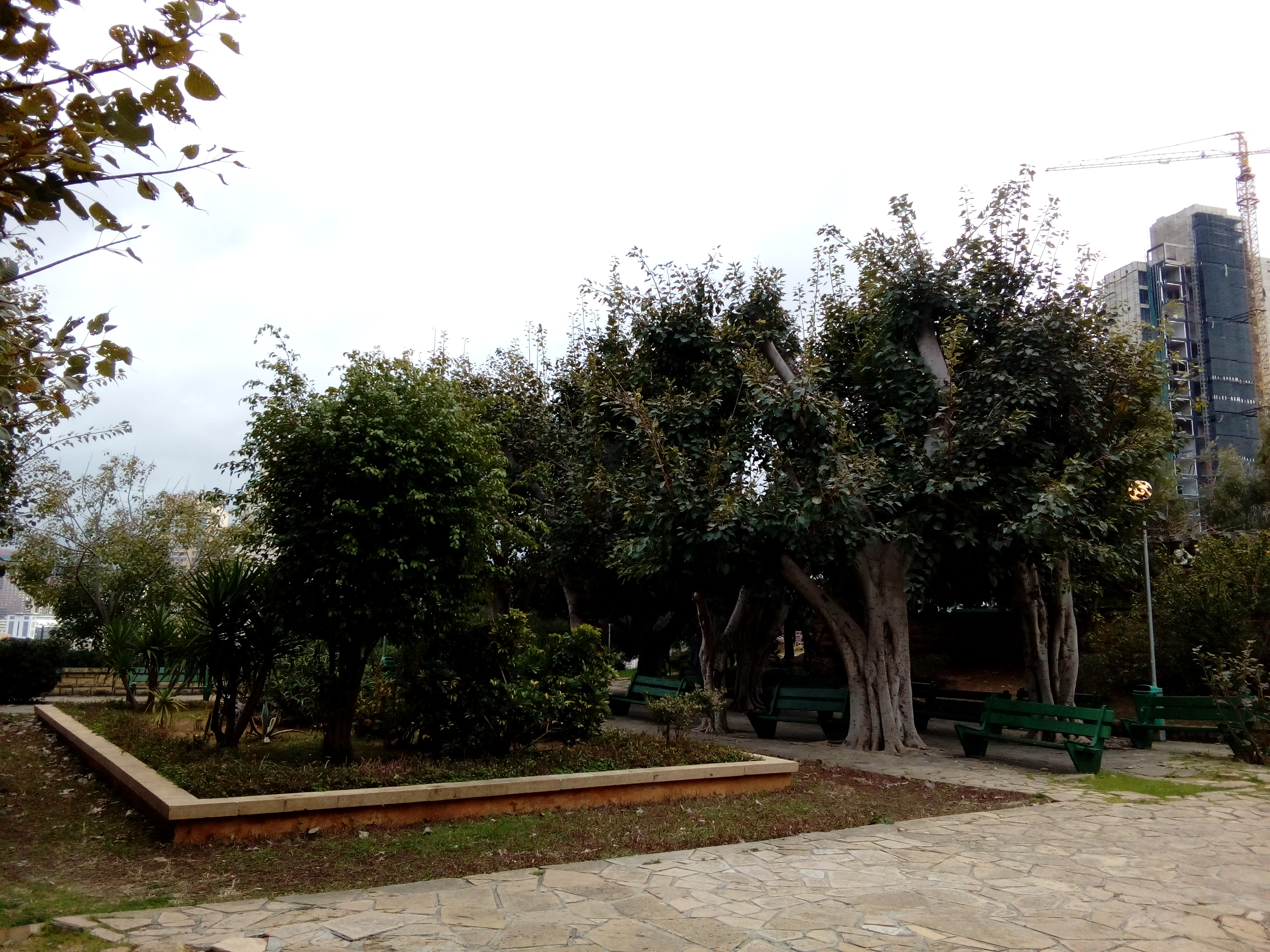
The Sioufi Garden

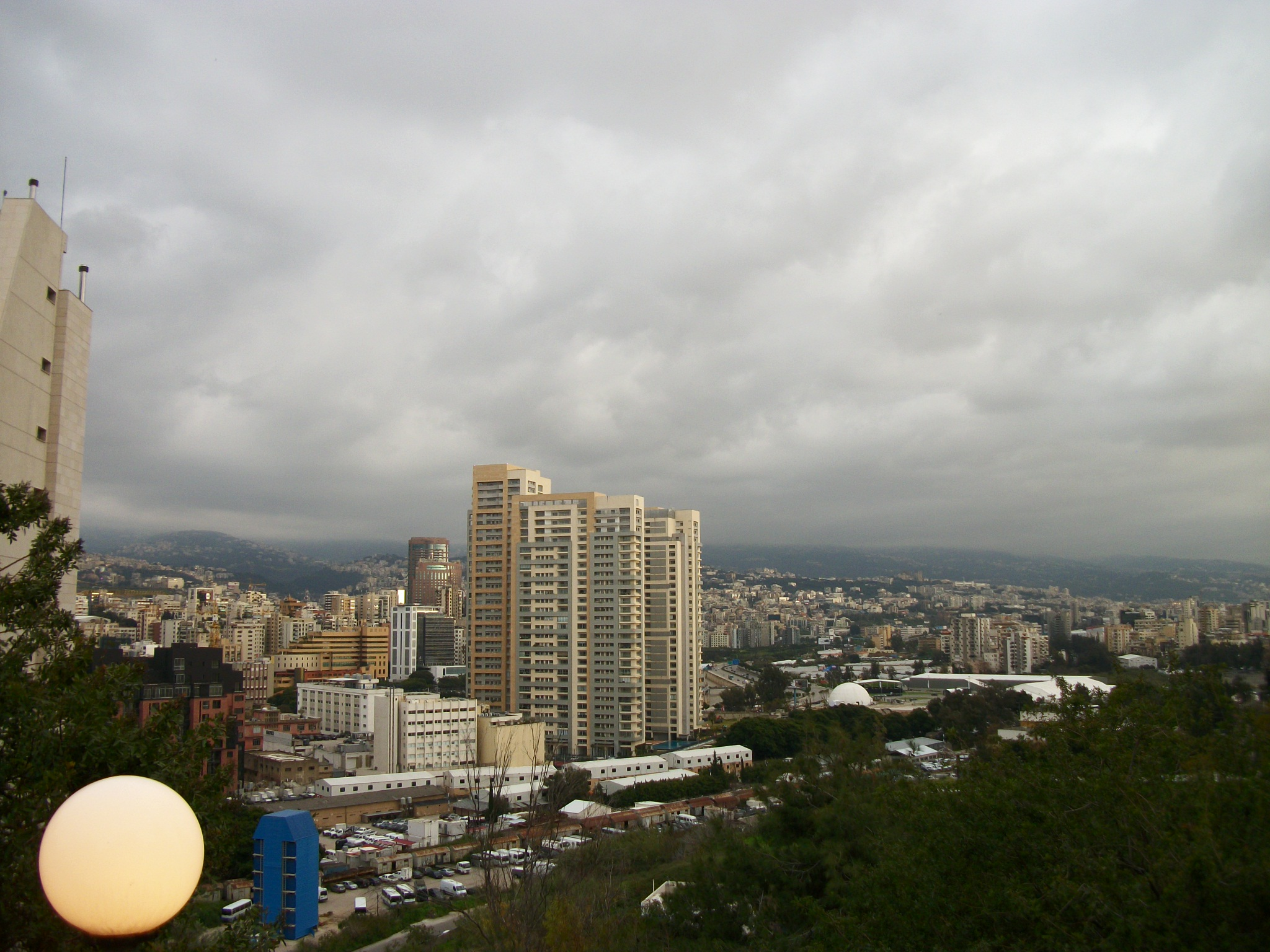
View of Beirut from the heights of the garden of Sioufi

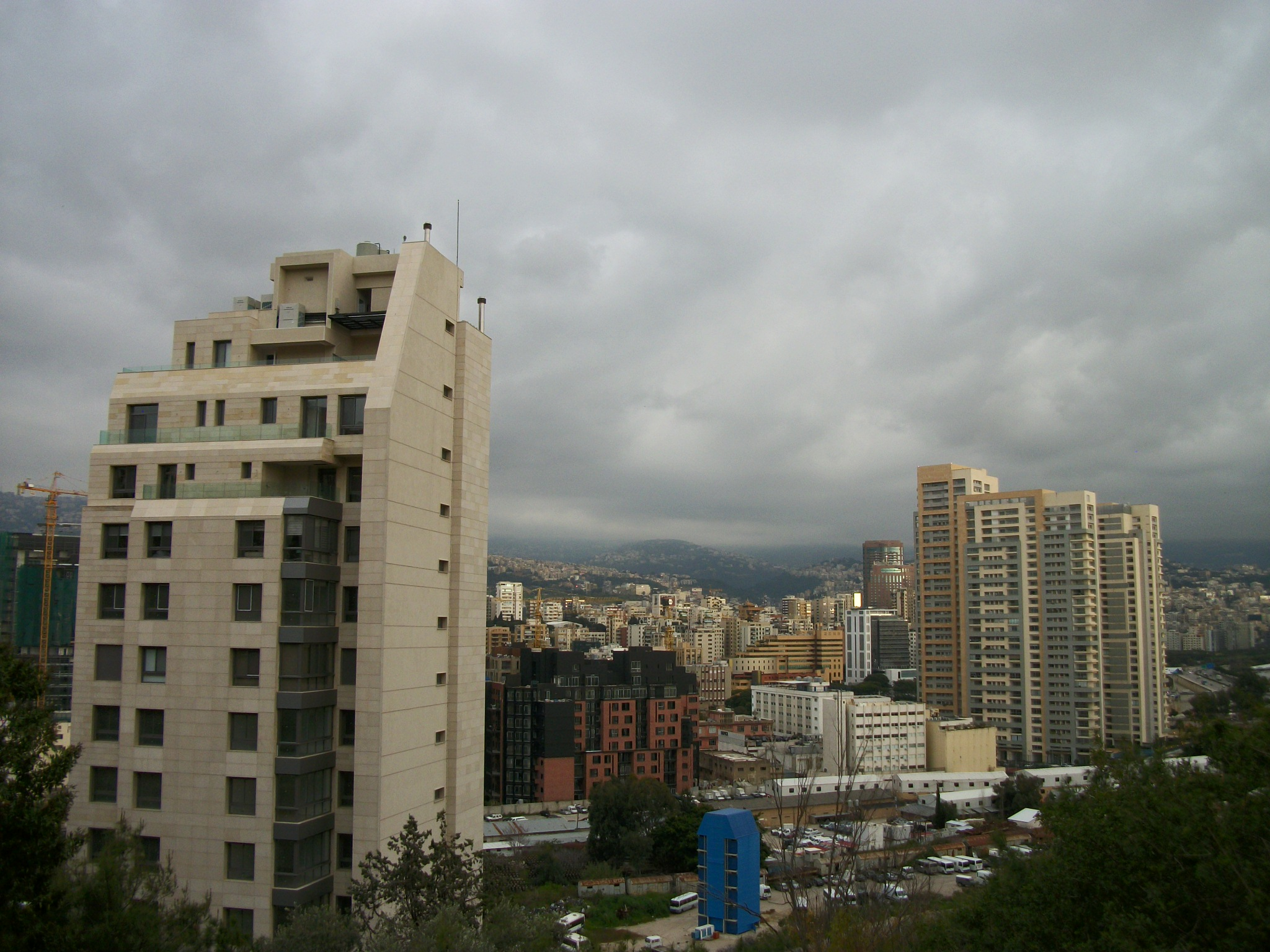
