= Michel Georges Sassine =

Lebanese politician

His Excellency Michel Sassine ميشال ساسين
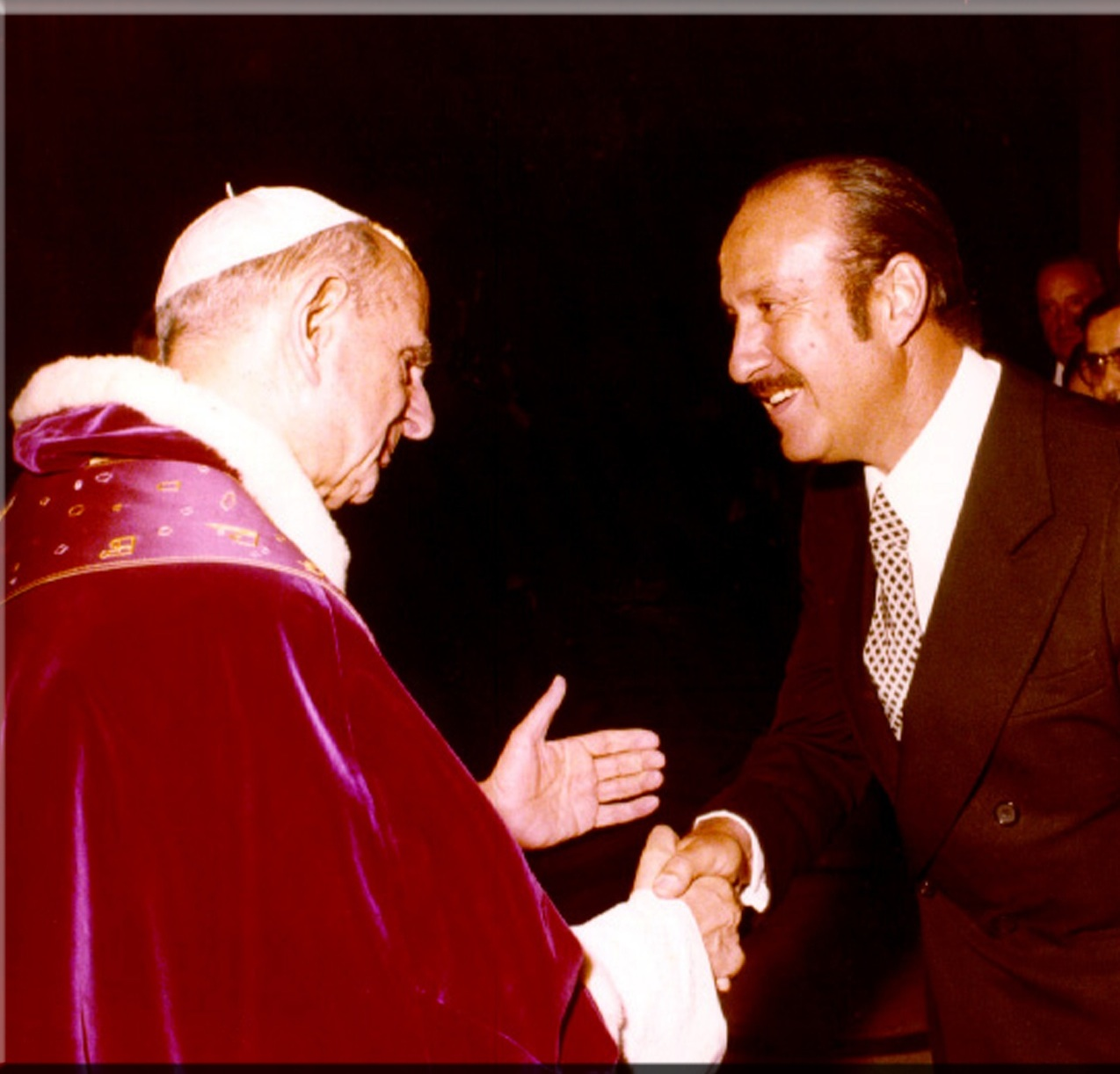
- H.E. Michel Sassine with Pope Paul VI

Deputy Prime Minister of Lebanon

Deputy Speaker of the Parliament of Lebanon

Minister of Labor

Minister of Tourism

Minister of Housing and Cooperatives

Member of Parliament

Personal details
- Born: 27 February 1927 Achrafieh, State of Greater Lebanon
- Died: 2 August 2014 (aged 87) Achrafieh, Lebanon
- Party: Independent

Michel Sassine (Arabic: ميشال جورج ساسين; 27 February 1927 – 2 August 2014) was a prominent Lebanese politician. He was a member of the Lebanese parliament for twenty-four consecutive years (1968–1992) representing the district of Ashrafieh, Beirut. He served several times as Deputy Prime Minister, Deputy Speaker of Parliament, and cabinet Minister. He founded the Ministry of Housing and Cooperatives, and was appointed as Minister of Labor, Tourism and others in more than seven governments. Throughout his political career he was renowned for his strong ethics and anti-corruption principles. He took the lead on several historic turning points including the 1970 Presidential election, and the Taif Agreement in 1990.

== Personal life ==
Sassine was born to a prominent Greek Orthodox family in Ashrafieh to parents Georges Sassine and Laurice Bustros. He lost his father in his teenage years and found himself responsible for four other siblings including new-born twins. Sassine led his family into politics, and together with his brothers Pierre and Joseph dedicated the family's efforts to public service.

== 1968 Parliamentary elections ==
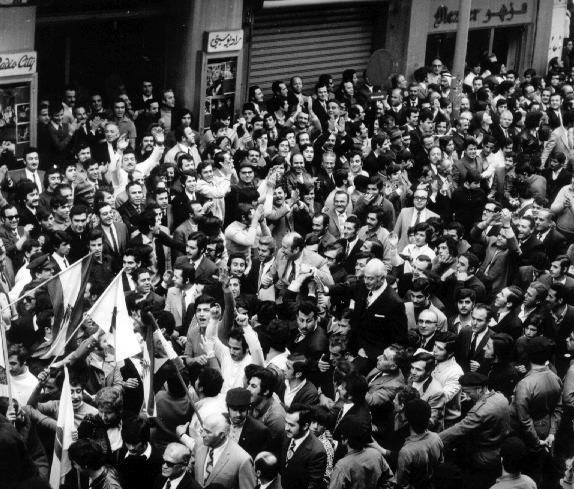
Michel Sassine and Nasri Maalouf winning 1968 elelctions

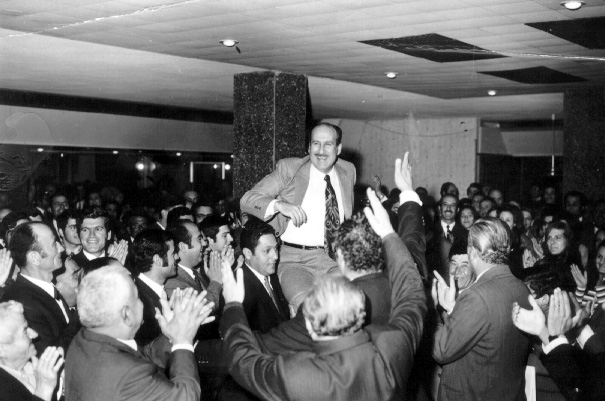
Michel Sassine winning the 1968 elelctions

Michel Sassine was first elected to the Lebanese Parliament in 1968 running for the Greek Orthodox seat in the nation's capital Beirut. Sassine ran alongside Nasri Maalouf and together, as independents, won against the government-backed coalition led by Sheikh Pierre Gemayel - including Minister of Foreign Affairs Fouad Boutros.

== 1970 Presidential elections ==
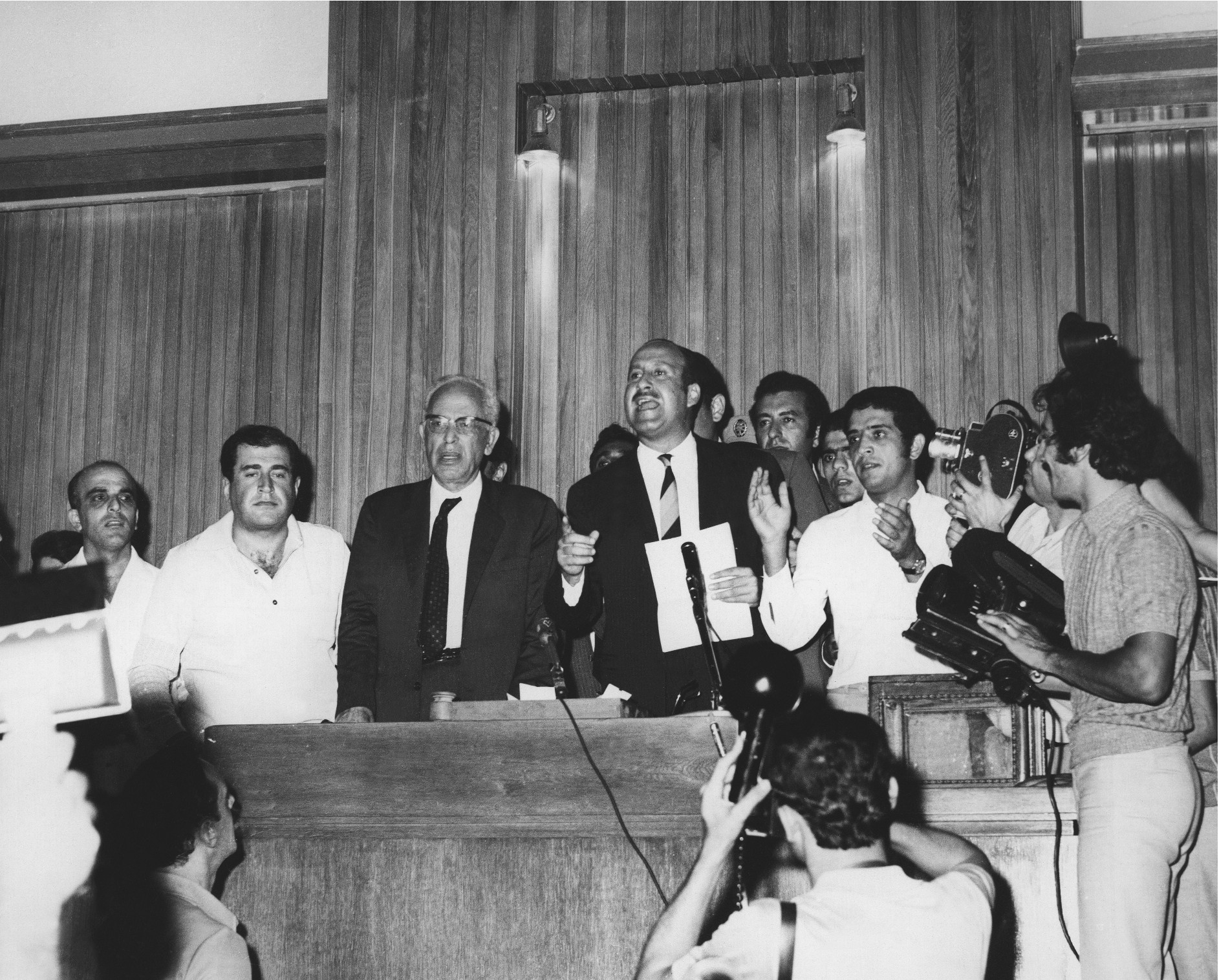
Deputy Speaker Michel Sassine declaring Suleiman Franjieh President of Lebanon in 1970

In the closest and possibly most controversial presidential election in Lebanese history, Suleiman Frangieh was elected President of the Republic by the National Assembly on 17 August 1970, with a majority of one single vote. The presidency being the most powerful political institution in pre-1990 Lebanon the presidential race was of particular importance as it came after 12 years of continuous Shihabist rule (Fuad Shihab 1958-1964, and Charles Helou, 1964–1970). The two main opposing candidates emerged to be Elias Sarkis – then Governor of the Central Bank – backed by the Shihabi regime; and Suleiman Frangieh backed by the opposition.

On the third voting round, Frangieh received majority by a single vote over Elias Sarkis. Sabri Hamadeh, then Speaker of Parliament and supporter of the Shihab regime, refused to announce the election of a President on such a low margin, and walked out of Parliament. Michel Sassine, Deputy Speaker of Parliament, stepped up and assumed the responsibilities of Speaker and announced Frangieh President in a move that saved the country of an inevitable political vacuum.

Sassine moved to serve as Minister and Deputy Prime Minister of Lebanon in the four different governments between 1972-1975 under the mandate of President Frangieh.

== Political Alliance With Camille Chamoun ==
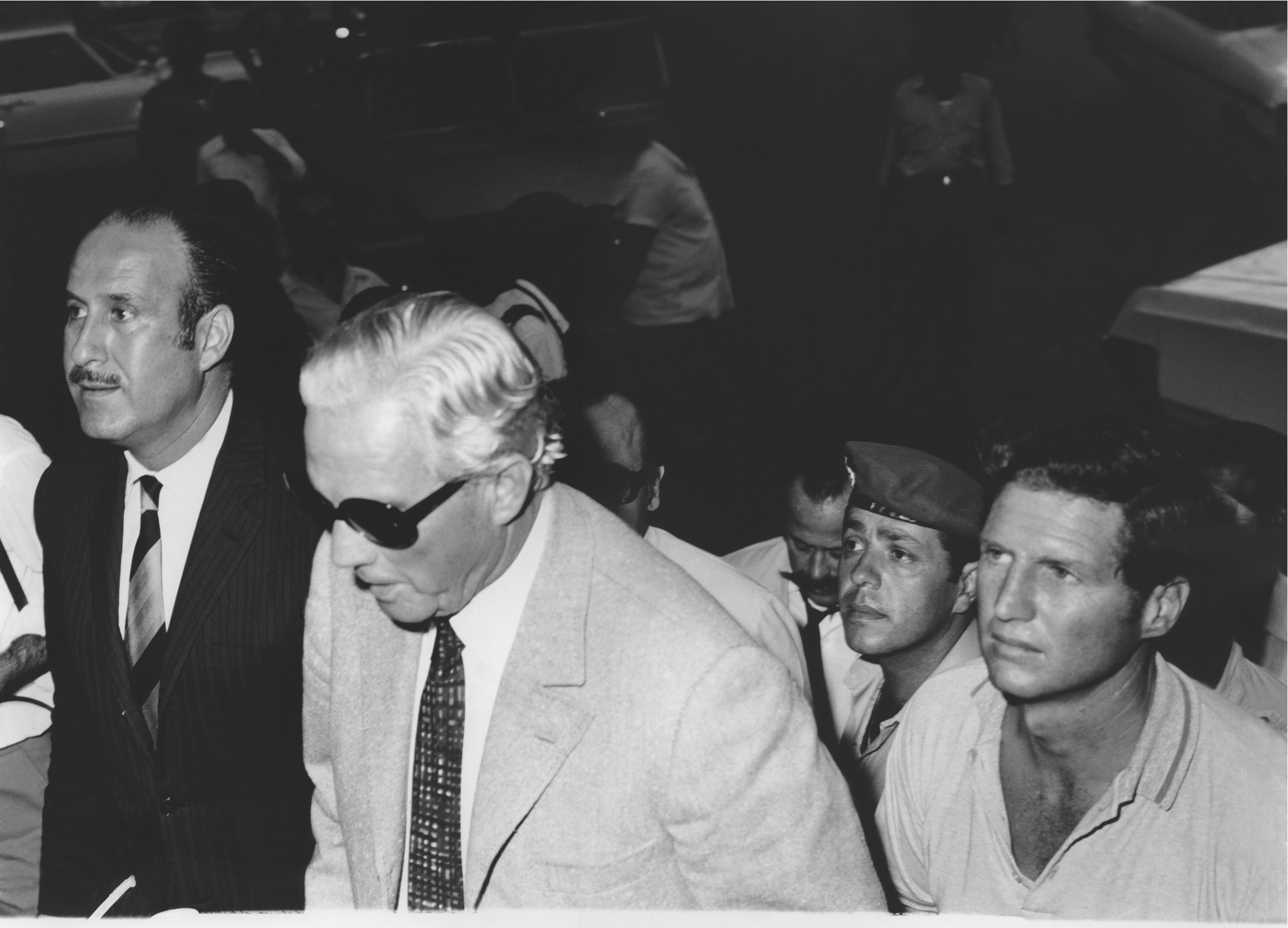
Deputy Prime Minister Michel Sassine with President Camille Chamoun and his son Dany Chamoun

Michel Sassine initially got elected as an independent and was never part of any political party throughout his career. Nevertheless, he developed a close political and personal relationship with President Camille Chamoun, and took a leading role in the National Liberal Party (Lebanon) (Al Ahrar) parliamentary block until the death of Chamoun's son Dany in 1990.

== Role in Taif Agreement ==
Sassine was a signatory of the Taif Agreement that ended the Lebanese Civil War. He was serving as Deputy Speaker of Parliament when Parliament signed the agreement on 22 October 1989 and ratified it on 4 November 1989. In the post-Taif period Sassine was appointed Deputy Prime Minister and Minister of Labor in both the 1990-1992 governments of Salim al-Hoss, and Omar Karami.

== Other achievements ==
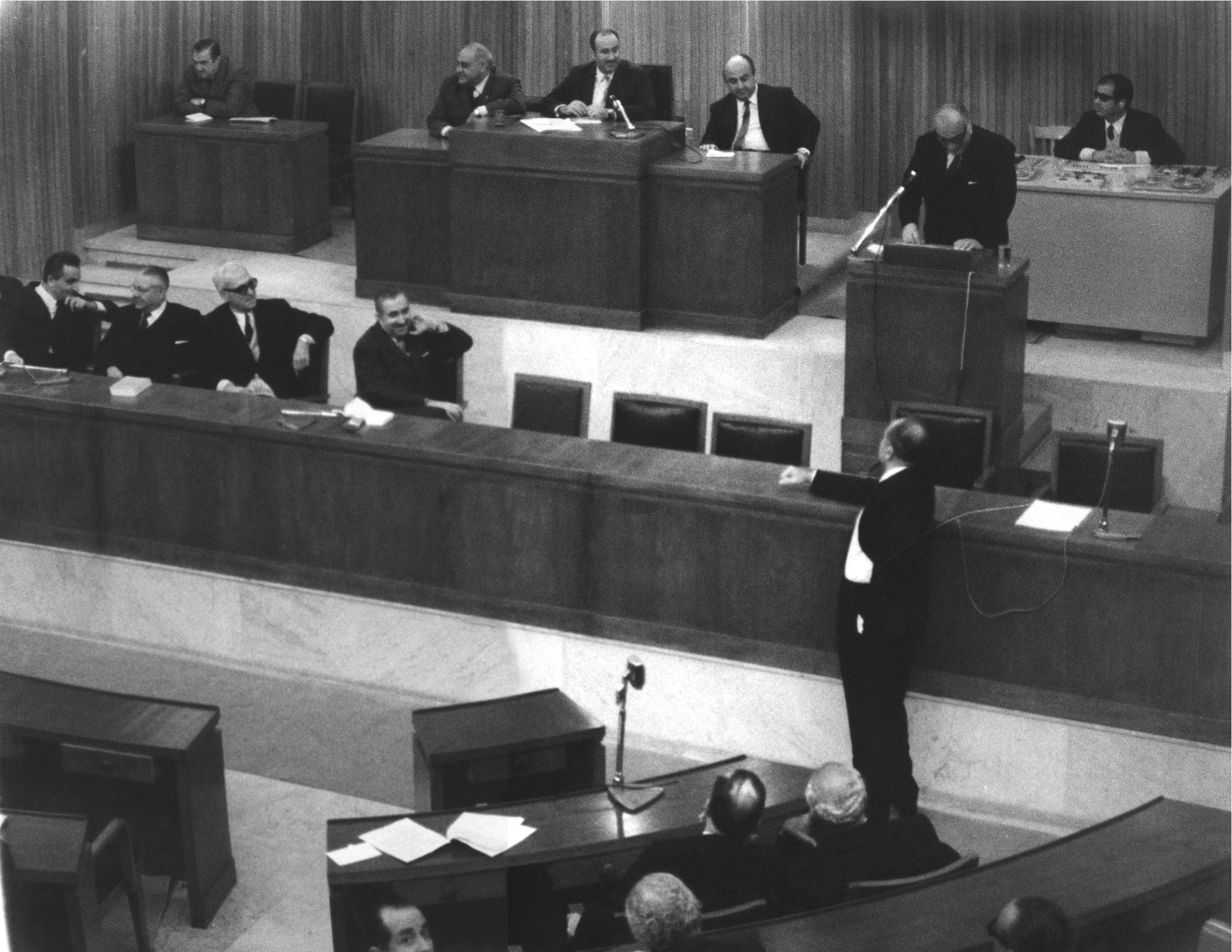
Deputy Speaker Sassine presiding the Lebanese Parliament

- Exercised full powers of Deputy Prime Minister and Deputy Speaker of Parliament: as Sassine occupied the highest positions allocated to Greek Orthodox in the Lebanese sectarian system he remains one of the few to have exercised the full power of these offices, as they remain symbolic otherwise. Other than his role in the 1970 Presidential elections, he acted as Speaker of Parliament on numerous occasions and led parliament on many junctures to pass significant reforms. Sassine's ability to exercise the Greek Orthodox Deputy responsibilities was due to both strong political backing and personal character.
- Saved 24 Lebanese from execution in Guinea: in the early 1970s thirteen Lebanese were sentenced to death in Africa's Guinea in an attempted coup against President Ahmed Sekou Toure. As the execution order was to be carried a week after their arrest, and many mediation efforts for their release failed, President Suleiman Frangieh tasked Michel Sassine, then Deputy Prime Minister, on an urgent diplomatic mission to Guinea. Sassine succeeded in his intervention as Sekou Toure agreed to issue a Presidential pardon and handed all thirteen Lebanese detainees to Sassine to bring back to Lebanon.

== Association to Sassine Square ==
Sassine Square in Ashrafieh is one of the most prominent political, social and commercial focal points of the Lebanese capital. While Sassine Street was named after the Sassine family in the late 1920s, the Sassine Square expansion took place in 1968 and Michel Sassine moved to get it officially inaugurated in the early 1990s under the auspices of President Elias Hrawi and Prime-Minister Rafic Hariri.
