= Miss Lebanon 2025 =

63rd edition of Miss Lebanon

- Date: October 4, 2025
- Presenters: Hilda Khalife
- Entertainment: Nancy Ajram
- Venue: Ezol Studios, Zouk Mosbeh, Lebanon
- Broadcaster: LBCI
- Entrants: 16
- Placements: 8
- Winner: Perla Harb; Al-Maamriyah

Miss Lebanon 2025 was the 63rd edition of the Miss Lebanon pageant, held on October 4, 2025, at Ezol Studios, Zouk Mosbeh, Lebanon. Nada Koussa of Rahbeh crowned her successor Perla Harb of Al-Maamriyah at the end of the event. Harb represented Lebanon at Miss World 2026, where she placed in the Top 40.

== Results ==
Placement	Contestant	International Placement
Miss Lebanon 2025	Perla Harb	Top 40; Miss World 2026
Miss Lebanon 2025	Perla Harb	TBD; Miss Universe 2026
1st Runner-up	Chloé Khalife	
2nd Runner-up	Carla Dahdah	
3rd Runner-up	Yasmina Halaby	
4th Runner-up	Sarah Samaha	
Top 8	Aya Fakher; Ingrid Kazan; Mary-Lynn Yammine	

== Contestants ==
Sixteen contestants will compete for the title.

No.	Name	Age	Hometown
1	Adriana Diab	22	Haret Hreik
2	Aya Fakher	22	Bechamoun
3	Carla Dahdah	22	Zgharta
4	Céline Zgheib	22	Hrajel
5	Chloé Khalife	24	Hadath
6	Christie Mneineh	18	Achrafieh
7	Ingrid Kazan	22	Shiyyah
8	Jennifer El Hachem	23	Zouk Mikael
9	Marie-Joe Darwich	21	Mousaitbeh
10	Mary-Lynn Yammine	20	Zahlé
11	Nathalie Bichani	25	Tripoli
12	Nour Gebrael	24	Barouk
13	Perla Harb	22	Al-Maamriyah
14	Sandy Eid	23	Hadchit
15	Sarah Samaha	25	Khenchara
16	Yasmina Halaby	23	Dhour El Choueir

== Judges ==
- Suchata Chuangsri – Miss World 2025 from Thailand
- Valerie Abou Chacra – Miss Lebanon 2015
- Nicolas Jebran – Fashion designer
- Bassam Fattouh – Makeup artist
- Laura Khazen Lahoud – Minister of Tourism
- Paula Yacoubian – Parliamentarian
- Ibrahim Maalouf – Musician
- Rym Breidy – Model
