= Perla Harb =

Lebanese beauty pageant titleholder

- بيرلا حرب
- Born: 2002 or 2003 (age 23–24); Maamariyeh, Sidon District, Lebanon
- Education: Lebanese American University (BS)
- Occupations: Banking and finance professional; model
- Height: 1.75 m (5 ft 9 in)
- Beauty pageant titleholder
- Title: Miss Lebanon 2025; Miss World Lebanon 2026; Miss Universe Lebanon 2026
- Major competitions: Miss Lebanon 2025; (Winner); Miss World 2026; (Top 40); Miss Universe 2026; (TBD)

Perla Ghazi Harb (Arabic: بيرلا غازي حرب; born c. 2002/2003) is a Lebanese model, banking professional and beauty pageant titleholder who was crowned Miss Lebanon 2025. She will represent Lebanon at Miss Universe 2026. She previously represented the country at Miss World 2026 and landed among the Top 40 semifinalists.

== Early life and education ==
Harb was raised in the village of Maamariyeh, Sidon District, Lebanon. She attended the Lebanese American University (LAU), where she earned a Bachelor of Science degree in Banking and Finance. Additionally, Harb also works as a professional model.

== Pageantry ==
=== Miss Lebanon 2025 ===
On 4 October 2025, Harb represented her hometown at the Miss Lebanon 2025 competition held at the ISOL Arena in Zouk Mosbeh, north of Beirut. Hosted by Hilda Khalife and organized under the patronage of the Lebanese Ministry of Tourism, the event featured 16 contestants evaluated by a panel of judges that included Tourism Minister Laura Khazen Lahoud, MP Paula Yacoubian, composer Ibrahim Maalouf, and fashion designer Nicolas Jebran.

When asked during the final round what slogan she would choose for the pageant, Harb responded with "Hope," framing her candidacy around the resilience and revival of Lebanon. At the end of the ceremony, outgoing titleholder Nada Koussa crowned Harb as Miss Lebanon 2025.

=== Miss World 2026 ===
As Miss Lebanon 2025, Harb was selected to represent Lebanon at the 75th edition of the Miss World 2026 pageant in Vietnam. For her "Beauty with a Purpose" campaign, she launched an initiative centered on digital safety and combatting online harassment and cyberbullying targeting women and vulnerable communities.

=== Miss Universe 2026 ===
Harb will represent Lebanon at Miss Universe 2026 in San Juan, Puerto Rico.

Awards and achievements
Preceded by Nada Koussa	Miss Lebanon; 2025	Incumbent
Preceded by Nada Koussa	Miss World Lebanon; 2026	Incumbent
Preceded by Sarah Bou Jaoude	Miss Universe Lebanon; 2026	Incumbent
