= Miss Lebanon 2024 =

62nd edition of Miss Lebanon

- Date: July 27, 2024
- Presenters: Aimée Sayah
- Entertainment: Elissa; Omar Rahbany
- Venue: Seaside Arena, Beirut, Lebanon
- Broadcaster: LBCI
- Entrants: 15
- Placements: 8
- Winner: Nada Koussa

Miss Lebanon 2024 was the 62nd edition of the Miss Lebanon pageant, held on July 27, 2024, at the Seaside Arena, Beirut, Lebanon. Nada Koussa of Rahbeh was crowned by Yasmina Zaytoun of Kfarchouba at the end of the event.

Koussa will I represent Lebanon at Miss Universe 2024 and will also she compete at Miss World 2025.

== Background ==
On June 25, 2024, Miss Lebanon broadcaster LBCI confirmed that the pageant would be held on July 27. The announcement came after a one-year hiatus, during which LBCI was forced to cancel the 2023 competition due to the lack of sponsors. It was revealed that Lebanese singer Elissa would be performing during the event.

International Lebanese jeweler Mouawad was the crown sponsor for this pageant, and provided the Cedar of Hope crown.

As is customary, a Lebanese fashion designer Tony Ward was chosen to provide evening gowns to the contestants.

For the first time, the jury was entirely made up of women. This was an effort to promote female empowerment.

=== Selection of participants ===
In March 2024 LBCI released a video on Instagram encouraging Lebanese women to attend the Miss Lebanon 2024 contestant casting. Those living in the abroad were also encouraged to enter the competition.

== Results ==
Placement	Contestant	International Placement
Miss Lebanon 2024	Nada Koussa	●(Unplaced) Miss Universe 2024 ●(Top 20) Miss World 2025
1st Runner-up	Sarah Leena Bou Jaoude	Miss Universe 2025 (Unplaced)
2nd Runner-up	Gaelle Balian	
3rd Runner-up	Melissa Kozah	
4th Runner-up	Sibelle Bou Chaaya	
Top 8	Maria Bathish; Nour Salem; Thouraya Assaf	

== Contestants ==
Fifteen contestants competed for the title.

No.	Name	Age	Hometown
1	Celine Beaino	21	Aintoura
2	Chloe Hanna	23	Tannourine
3	Gaelle Balian	25	Sin el Fil
4	Lynn Hitti	22	Zalka
5	Maria Bathish	24	Ehden
6	Melissa Kozah	22	Deir Al-Ahmar
7	Nada Koussa	26	Rahbeh
8	Natalys Shamseddine	25	Al Bennay
9	Noor Breich	25	Ain Qani
10	Nour Salem	25	Saghbine
11	Sara Makki	22	Kathouratiyet Al Siyad
12	Sarah Al-Aridi	26	Baissour
13	Sarah Leena Bou Jaoude	19	Jdeideh
14	Sibelle Bou Chaaya	24	Taybeh
15	Thouraya Assaf	21	Tyre

== Jury members ==
These were:

- Razane Jammal – Actress
- Nour Arida – Model and fashion blogger
- Diana Ghandour – Interior designer
- Georgina Rizk – Miss Universe 1971
- Petra Khoury – Doctor
- Paola Pharaon Rizk – Socialite
- Raya Abirached – Television presenter
- Mireille Hayek – Restaurateur
