= List of Lebanese television series =

This is a list of television series produced in Lebanon in chronological order.

== List ==
Year(s)	Title	Director/Creator	Channel
1972-present	Studio El Fan	Simon Asmar (original), others	MTV (2009-present); LBC; Télé Liban
1980-1981	Al Mouaallima Wal Oustaz	Ghassan Ashkar	Télé Liban
1992-2016	Mini Studio	Ghazy Feghaly	MTV
1995-present	Basmat Watan	Charbel Khalil	LBC
2003-?	Kids Power		MTV
2003-2016	Star Academy Arabia	Roula Saad (2003–2011)	LBCI
2006-2009	The Biggest Winner		MBC 1
2008-present	Ahmar Bel Khat El Arid	Mazen Laham	LBC
2008	Muhammad: The Final Legacy	Mohammad Sheikh Najib	LBC
2009-2010	Sarah	Samir Habchy	MTV
2009	Dr. Hala	Ghaby Saad	MTV
2010-2012	Ajyal	Claudia Marchalian	Murr TV
2010-2014	Celebrity Duets Arab World	Kamil Tanios	MTV
2011–2017	Arab Idol	Simon Fuller	MBC 1
2011-2012, 2016-present	Top Chef (Middle Eastern and North African TV series)	Wassim Succar	LBC, MBC
2012-2019, 2025-present	The Voice: Ahla Sawt	John de Mol	MBC 1, LBCI
2012	Ruby (2012 TV series)	Rami Hanna	MBC 1, LBCI
2017-2020	Al Hayba	Samer Al Barkawi	MBC and MTV Lebanon
2019	Dollar (TV series)		Netflix
2022	Aal Had	Layal M. Rajha	Shahid
2023	Al Thaman	Fikret Kadioglu, Serdal Genç	MBC 1
