= Maya Aboul Hosn =

Lebanese beauty pageant titleholder, Miss Universe Lebanon 2023

- مايا أبو الحسن
- Born: January 16, 1998 (age 28); Btekhnay, Baabda District, Lebanon
- Education: American University of Science and Technology (Communication Arts / Radio & Television)
- Occupations: Beauty pageant titleholder; influencer; model; television presenter
- Height: 1.67 m (5 ft 6 in)
- Beauty pageant titleholder
- Title: Miss Beit Mery 2014; Miss International Beauty Maten 2018; Miss Universe Lebanon 2023
- Hair color: Brown
- Eye color: Brown
- Major competitions: Miss Lebanon 2022; (1st Runner-Up); Miss Universe 2023; (Unplaced)

Maya Aboul Hosn (Arabic: مايا أبو الحسن; born January 16, 1998) is a Lebanese model, influencer, television presenter and beauty pageant titleholder who was crowned Miss Universe Lebanon 2023 after placing as 1st Runner-Up at the Miss Lebanon 2022 pageant. She represented Lebanon at the Miss Universe 2023 pageant in El Salvador on November 18, 2023.

== Early life and education ==
Maya Aboul Hosn was born in Btekhnay, Lebanon, to Lebanese Druze parents. She obtained a Bachelor of Arts from the American University of Science and Technology in Communication Arts / Radio & Television.

== Pageantry ==
=== Miss Beit Mery 2014 ===
In July 2014, Aboul Hosn competed at a local Lebanese pageant, Miss Beit Mery, where she was eventually crowned the winner.

=== Miss International Beauty Maten 2018 ===
In September 2018, Aboul Hosn competed at another local Lebanese pageant, Miss International Beauty Maten, where she was eventually crowned the winner.

=== Miss Lebanon 2022 ===
In July 2022, Aboul Hosn competed alongside 16 other contestants for the Miss Lebanon 2022 title at the Forum de Beyrouth, eventually finishing as 1st Runner-Up to Yasmina Zaytoun of Kfarchouba.

=== Miss Universe 2023 ===
In September 2023, Aboul Hosn was appointed to represent Lebanon at the 72nd Miss Universe pageant in El Salvador on November 18, 2023, after Miss Lebanon organizer LBCI failed to hold Miss Lebanon 2023 due to a lack of sponsorship. She ended up as one of the top 10 finalists of the Voice For Change contest, a sub-contest in which contestants advocated for a social cause of their choice.

At the end of the competition, Aboul Hosn was one out of seven Miss Universe contestants chosen to travel to Mexico to promote the 73rd Miss Universe pageant.

== Television career ==
In February 2023, Aboul Hosn appeared as a guest on MTV Lebanon's duet singing show, El Layle Sawa, where she was paired with another guest to sing with.

In April 2023, Aboul Hosn took up a hosting position at LBCI's morning show, Morning Talk.

In September 2023, Aboul Hosn served as the red carpet correspondent for the 2023 Murex d'Or awards ceremony, which was broadcast on LBCI.

Awards and achievements
Preceded by Yasmina Zaytoun	Miss Universe Lebanon; 2023	Succeeded by Nada Koussa
Preceded by Mira Toufaily	Miss Lebanon 1st Runner-Up; 2022	Succeeded by Sarah Leena Boujaoude
