= Miss Lebanon 2018 =

60th edition of Miss Lebanon

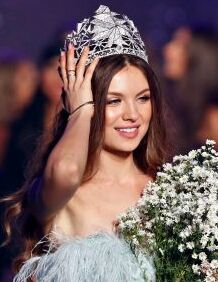
- Maya Reaidy, Miss Lebanon 2018
- Date: September 30, 2018
- Presenters: Marcel Ghanem; Annabella Hilal
- Entertainment: Ragheb Alama; Maya Diab; Massari; French Montana
- Venue: Forum de Beyrouth, Beirut
- Broadcaster: MTV Lebanon
- Entrants: 30
- Placements: 15
- Winner: Maya Reaidy
- Congeniality: Zahra El Sayed
- Photogenic: Karma Dirany

Miss Lebanon 2018 the 60th edition of the Miss Lebanon pageant, was held on September 30, 2018 at Forum de Beyrouth in Beirut where 30 candidates from different regions of Lebanon competed for the national crown. First place winner of the pageant was Maya Reaidy. Second place winner was Mira Toufaily. Third place winner was Yara Abou Monsef.

The first place winner of the pageant represents Lebanon at Miss Universe 2018. The second place represents Lebanon at Miss World 2018.

== Results ==
=== Placements ===
Results	Contestant
Miss Lebanon 2018	26 – Maya Reaidy
Miss Congeniality 2018	11 – Zahra El Sayed
1st Runner-Up	29 – Mira Toufaily
2nd Runner-Up	4 – Yara Abou Monsef
3rd Runner-Up	30 – Vanessa Yazbeck
4th Runner-Up	27 – Tatiana Saroufim
Top 10	2 – Jessica Abboud; 7 – Nathalie Aouad; 16 – Marie Therese Hanna; 19 – Nourhane Ibrahim; 23 – Maria Makhlouf
Top 15	3 – Chloe Abi Zeid; 13 – Fabienne Habchy; 17 – Jennifer Helou; 22 – Jessica Kesserwany; 28 – Cendrella Tawachi

== Jury Members ==
- Demi-Leigh Nel-Peters – Miss Universe 2017 from South Africa
- Nancy Ajram – Singer.
- Nadine Nassib Njeim – Miss Lebanon 2004
- Nicolas Jebran – Fashion designer.
- George Kurdahi – TV presenter.
- Adel Karam – Actor and TV presenter.
- Guy Manoukian – Composer
- Bassam Fattouh – Make-Up Artist.
- Doumit Zoughaib – Jewelry Designer

== Contestants ==
No.	Name	Placements
1	Elianor Abboud	
2	Jessica Abboud	Top 10
3	Chloe Abi Zeid	Top 15
4	Yara Abou Monsef	2nd Runner-up
5	Nasab Al Jurdy	
6	Nirvana Al Jurdy	
7	Nathalie Aouad	Top 10
8	Reda Bechara	
9	Lina Deek	
10	Karma Dirani	Miss Photogenic 2018
11	Zahra El Sayed	Miss Congeniality 2018
12	Melissa El Khoury	
13	Fabienne Habchy	Top 15
14	Tania Habib	
15	Marie-Christelle Haddad	
16	Marie Therese Hanna	Top 10
17	Jennifer Helou	Top 15
18	Dunia Ibrahim	
19	Nourhane Ibrahim	Top 10
20	Elsy Irany	
21	Stephanie Karam	
22	Jessica Kesserwany	Top 15
23	Maria Makhlouf	Top 10
24	Sandra Mbarak	
25	Catherine Nassif	
26	Maya Reaidy	Miss Lebanon 2018
27	Tatiana Saroufim	4th Runner-Up
28	Cendrella Tawachi	Top 15
29	Mira Toufaily	Miss World Lebanon 2018 1st Runner-up
30	Vanessa Yazbeck	3rd Runner-Up
