= Miss Lebanon =

Beauty pageant

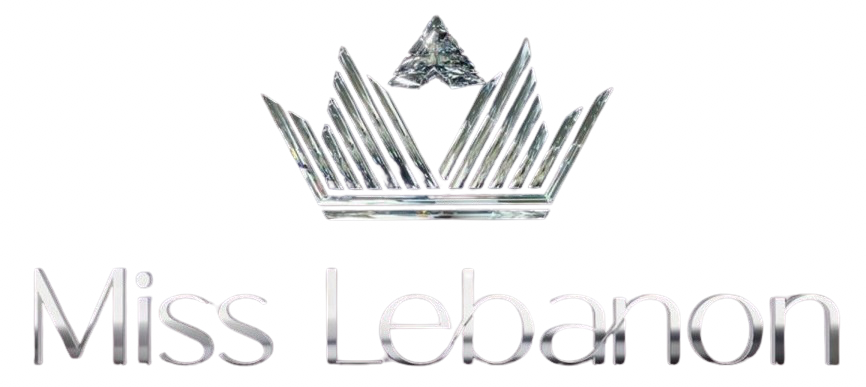
- Type: Beauty pageant
- Headquarters: Beirut
- First edition: 1930
- Most recent edition: 2025
- Current titleholder: Perla Harb
- Language: Arabic

Miss Lebanon (Arabic: ملكة جمال لبنان, romanized: Malikat Jamāl Lubnān, lit. 'Queen of Beauty of Lebanon') is the national beauty pageant of Lebanon. The winner is a representative of the Ministry of Tourism and is sent to represent Lebanon at Miss Universe and Miss World.

== History ==
Since 1995, the pageant has been broadcast on Lebanese Broadcasting Corporation International (LBCI), with the exception of Miss Lebanon 2018 which was broadcast on MTV Lebanon. It is currently organized by Vanilla Productions, which is owned by Rola Saad. Since 2018, former Miss USA Rima Fakih has been in charge of preparing the winner for Miss Universe. The pageant has been canceled a few times due to civil wars, conflicts with Israel and economic crises. The Miss Lebanon Organization awards its winner prizes totalling hundreds of thousands of dollars. As a representative of the Ministry of Tourism, it is customary that the winner meets with the President of Lebanon following her crowning, in addition to other high-ranking officials.

=== Format ===
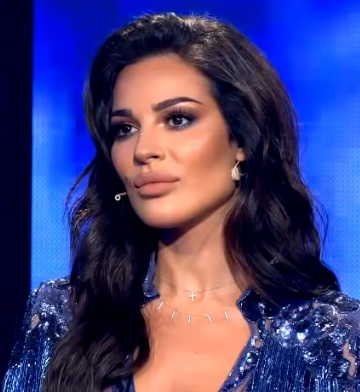
Nadine Nassib Njeim, Miss Lebanon 2004

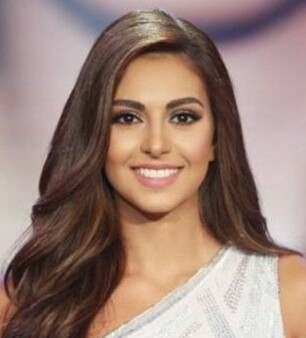
Valerie Abou Chacra, Miss Lebanon 2015

Every year, the Miss Lebanon pageant takes on a different number of contestants. Previously, the pageant has taken the form of multiple episodes, and a reality television show.

Below is an outline of the number of contestants and venue of the Miss Lebanon pageant in recent years:

Year	Miss Lebanon	Contestants	Venue
2000	Sandra Rizk	22	Casino du Liban
2001	Christina Sawaya	20	Casino du Liban
2003	Marie-José Hnein	16	LBC Centre
2004	Nadine Nassib Njeim	16	LBC Centre
2005	Gabrielle Bou Rached	30	Casino du Liban
2007	Nadine Wilson Njeim	18	Casino du Liban
2008	Rosarita Tawil	18	LBC Centre
2009	Martine Andraos	16	LBC Centre
2010	Rahaf Abdallah	16	LBC Centre
2011	Yara Khoury-Mikhael	16	Beirut Souks
2012	Rina Chibany	16	Platea Theatre
2013	Karen Ghrawi	15	Beirut Leisure Centre
2014	Saly Greige	14	Casino du Liban
2015	Valerie Abou Chacra	14	Casino du Liban
2016	Sandy Tabet	15	Casino du Liban
2017	Perla Helou	15	Casino du Liban
2018	Maya Reaidy	30	Forum de Beyrouth
2022	Yasmina Zaytoun	17	Forum de Beyrouth
2024	Nada Koussa	15	Seaside Arena Beirut
2025	Perla Harb	16	Ezol Studios Zouk Mosbeh
2026	TBA	TBA	TBA

== International crowns ==
- One – Miss Universe winner: Georgina Rizk (1971)
- One – Miss International winner: Christina Sawaya (2002)

== Titleholders ==
The winner of Miss Lebanon represents her country at the Miss Universe and Miss World pageants. On occasion, when the winner does not qualify (due to age) for either contest, a runner-up is sent. Previously, in some instances the winner has also competed at the Miss International pageant.

Year	Miss Lebanon
1930	Leila Zoghby
1935	Jamila Al Khalil
1952	Leila Saroufim
1953	Hania Beydoun
1958	Hind Skaff
1960	Gladys Tabet
1961	Leila Antaki
1962	Nouhad El Cabbabe
1964	Nana Barakat
1965	Yolla Georges Harb
1966	Marlène Talih
1967	Sonia Fares
1968	Lilly Bissar
1969	Georgette Gerro
1970	Georgina Rizk; Miss Universe 1971
1971	Christiane Accaoui
1972	Marcelle Herro
1973	Sylvia Ohannessian
1974	Gisèle Hachem
1975	Ramona Karam
1977	Vera Alouane
1978	Katia Fakhry
1979	Jocelyne Daou
1980	Denise Sfeir
1981	Suzanne Bou Nader
1982	Dolly Michel Khoury
1983	Sylvia Hobeika
1984	Reine Philip Barakat
1985	Mary Khoury
1986	Gina Issa
1987	Josiane Haddad
1988	Colette Boulos
1991	Diana Begdache
1992	Nicole Bardawil
1993	Ghada El Turk
1994	Lara Badawi
1995	Dina Azar
1996	Nisrine Sami Naser
1997	Joëlle Behlock
1998	Clémence Achkar
1999	Norma Elias Naoum
2000	Sandra Rizk
2001	Christina Sawaya; Miss International 2002
2003	Marie-José Hnein
2004	Nadine Nassib Njeim
2005	Gabrielle Bou Rached
2007	Nadine Wilson Njeim
2008	Rosarita Tawil
2009	Martine Andraos
2010	Rahaf Abdallah
2011	Yara Khoury-Mikhael
2012	Rina Chibany
2013	Karen Ghrawi
2014	Sally Greige
2015	Valerie Abou Chacra
2016	Sandy Tabet
2017	Perla Helou
2018	Maya Reaidy
2022	Yasmina Zaytoun
2024	Nada Koussa
2025	Perla Harb

== Titleholders under Miss Lebanon org. ==
The Miss Lebanon winner competes at the Miss World and Miss Universe pageants. On occasion, a runner-up is sent. Here International pageants under Miss Lebanon Organization; Miss Lebanon and Miss Lebanon Emigrant who will go to Miss International pageant.

The following women represented Lebanon in the Big Four international beauty pageants, the four major international beauty pageants for women. These are Miss World, Miss Universe and Miss International

=== Miss Universe Lebanon ===
- : Declared as Winner
- : Ended as runner-up or top 5/6 qualification
- : Ended as one of the finalists or semifinalists
- : Ended as special awards winner

Year	Hometown	Miss Universe Lebanon	Placement at Miss Universe	Special Awards	Notes
Pierre El Daher (chairman of LBCI) directorship — a franchise holder to Miss Universe from 2022: Rima Fakih was appointed by Miss Universe Organization as National director of Lebanon.
2026	Al-Maamriyah	Perla Harb	TBA		
2025	Jdeideh	Sarah Leena Bou Jaoude	Unplaced		
2024	Akkar	Nada Koussa	Unplaced		
2023	Btekhnay	Maya Aboul Hosn	Unplaced	Voice For Change (Silver Winner)	Since no pageant in 2023, a runner-up of Miss Lebanon 2022, Maya, was appointed by Miss Lebanon Committee to compete at Miss Universe 2023 in El Salvador.
2022	Kfarchouba	Yasmina Zaytoun	Unplaced		
Gabriel Murr (chairman of MTV) directorship — a franchise holder to Miss Universe between 2017―2018: Rima Fakih was appointed by Miss Universe Organization as National director of Lebanon.
Did not compete between 2019—2021
2018	Tannourine	Maya Reaidy	Unplaced		The Miss Lebanon program returned to MTV Lebanon, and Miss Lebanon winner competed at Miss Universe 2018.
2017	Beirut	Jana Sader	Unplaced		Sader was appointed by MTV Lebanon, since Miss Lebanon competition is the only one national pageant in Lebanon and the main winner in 2017 competed at Miss World 2017. Sader was a runner-up of Miss Lebanon 2017.
Pierre El Daher (chairman of LBCI) directorship — a franchise holder to Miss Universe between 1999―2016
2016	Beirut	Sandy Tabet	Did not compete		Miss Lebanon 2016 was unable to compete at Miss Universe 2016 after MTV Lebanon franchised the Miss Universe license; they didn't send her and didn't even send a delegate that year.
2015	Beirut	Cynthia Samuel	Unplaced		Samuel was appointed by Miss Lebanon Committee to compete at Miss Universe 2015, since the main winner allocated to Miss World 2015 in China. Samuel was a runner-up of Miss Lebanon 2015.
2014	Bishmizzine	Saly Greige	Unplaced		
2013	Beirut	Karen Ghrawi	Unplaced		
2012	Zahlé	Rina Chibany	Unplaced		The first twin who won Miss Lebanon in history.
2011	Beirut	Yara Khoury-Mikhael	Unplaced		
2010	Beirut	Rahaf Abdallah	Unplaced		
2009	Beirut	Martine Andraos	Unplaced		
2008	Beirut	Rosarita Tawil	Did not compete		
2007	Maaser El Shouf	Nadine Wilson Njeim	Unplaced		
2006	Jezzine	Gabrielle Bou Rached	Unplaced		
2005	Beirut	Nadine Nassib Njeim	Unplaced		
2004	Beirut	Marie-José Hnein	Unplaced		
Did not compete in 2003
2002	Bourj Hammoud	Christina Sawaya	Did not compete		Decided to drop out of the competition after stating that she would not compete in a pageant with Miss Israel.
2001	Beirut	Sandra Rizk	Unplaced		
2000	Beirut	Norma Elias Naoum	Unplaced		
1999	Beirut	Clémence Achkar	Unplaced	Best National Costume (2nd Runner-up)	Miss Lebanon Committee retook the Miss Universe license and the winner of Miss Lebanon returned to Miss Universe began 1999.
Gabriel Murr (chairman of MTV) directorship — a franchise holder to Miss Universe between 1997―1998: Miss Universe Lebanon (independent selection) held and the winner competed at Miss Universe pageant in several years.
1998	Beirut	Nina Kaddis	Unplaced		Appointed — The 3rd Runner-up of Miss Universe Lebanon 1997 appointed to represent Lebanon after the Miss Universe Lebanon did not happen in 1998.
1997	Beirut	Dalida Chammai	Unplaced		
Pierre El Daher (chairman of LBC) directorship — a franchise holder to Miss Universe between 1991―1996: Miss Universe Lebanon (independent selection) held and the winner competed at Miss Universe pageant in several years.
1996	Beirut	Julia Syriani	Unplaced		
Did not compete between 1994—1995
1993	Beirut	Samaya El Chedrawi	Unplaced	Best National Costume (1st Runner-up)	
1992	Beirut	Abir El Sharrouf	Unplaced		
1991	Beirut	Fida El Chehayeb	Unplaced		
Ministry of Tourism in Lebanon directorship — a franchise holder to Miss Universe between 1980―1988: Miss Universe Lebanon (independent selection) held and the winner competed at Miss Universe pageant in several years.
Did not compete between 1989—1990
1988	Beirut	Elaine Georges Fakhoury	Unplaced		
1987	Beirut	Sahar El Haydar	Unplaced		
1986	Beirut	Reine Philip Barakat	Unplaced		
1985	Beirut	Joyce Sahab	Unplaced		
1984	Tripoli	Susan El Sayed	Unplaced		
1983	Beirut	May Mansour Chahwan	Unplaced		
Raymond Loir (a founder of Miss Lebanon) directorship — a franchise holder to Miss Universe between 1955―1980: Miss Lebanon Committee was founded in 1960 by Raymond Loir, President of Foreign Press in the Middle East, press correspondent (Paris Match, France-Dimanche, Ici Paris, Écrits de Paris, Rivarol, Aspects de France, etc.). Following his death in 1980, a Ministry of Tourism in Lebanon took over the license.
Did not compete between 1979—1982
1978	Beirut	Renée Antoine Seman	Unplaced		
1977	Beirut	Hyam Saadé	Unplaced	Best National Costume (2nd Runner-up)	
Did not compete in 1976
1975	Beirut	Suad El Nachoul	Unplaced		
1974	Beirut	Laudy Slim Gabache	Unplaced		
Raymond Loir (a founder of Miss Lebanon) directorship — a franchise holder to Miss Universe between 1955―1980: Between 1955 and 1973 Miss Lebanon winners represented Lebanon at Miss Universe competition.
1973	Beirut	Marcèlle Herro	Top 12		
1972	Beirut	Christians Accaoui	Did not compete		
1971	Beirut	Georgina Rizk	Miss Universe 1971		
1970	Beirut	Georgette Gero	Unplaced		
1969	Beirut	Lilly Bissar	Did not compete		
1968	Beirut	Sonia Fares	Unplaced		
1967	Beirut	Marlène Talih	Did not compete		
1966	Beirut	Yolla Georges Harb	Unplaced		
1962	Beirut	Nouhad El Cabbabe	Top 15		
1961	Beirut	Leila Antaki	Unplaced		
1960	Beirut	Gládys Tabet	Unplaced		
Did not compete between 1956—1959
1955	Beirut	Hania Beydun	Unplaced		In 1955 the Miss Universe Lebanon was appointed by Raymond Loir. Hania was Miss Lebanon 1953 who did not compete internationally in her reign.

=== Miss World Lebanon ===
- : Declared as Winner
- : Ended as runner-up or top 5/6 qualification
- : Ended as one of the finalists or semifinalists
- : Ended as special awards winner

Year	Hometown	Miss World Lebanon	Placement at Miss World	Special Awards	Notes
Pierre El Daher (chairman of LBCI) directorship — a franchise holder to Miss World from 2023
2027	TBA	TBA	TBA		
2026	Al-Maamriyah	Perla Harb	Top 40		
2025	Akkar	Nada Koussa	Top 20		
Miss World 2023 was rescheduled to 2024 due to the change of host and when entering India as the new host, there were several issues that caused the postponement until March 2024.
2023	Kfarchouba	Yasmina Zaytoun	1st Runner up	Miss World Asia; Head-to-head challenge; Miss World Top Model (Top 20)	
Gabriel Murr (chairman of MTV) directorship — a franchise holder to Miss Universe between 2017―2018
Did not compete between 2019—2022
2018	Beirut	Mira Al-Toufaily	Unplaced	Head to head challenge; Beauty With A Purpose (Top 12)	Appointed — The 1st Runner-up of Miss Lebanon 2018 took over the Miss World Lebanon title since the original winner will only compete at Miss Universe 2018.
Pierre El Daher (chairman of LBCI) directorship — a franchise holder to Miss World between 1991―2017
2017	Baabda	Perla Helou	Top 40	Head to head challenge; Miss World Multimedia (Top 5); People's Choice award (Top 10)	
2016	Beirut	Sandy Tabet	Unplaced		
2015	Beirut	Valerie Abou Chacra	Top 5	Best in Interview; People's Choice Award (Top 5); Miss World Top Model (Top 30)	
2014	Bishmizzine	Saly Greige	Unplaced		
2013	Beirut	Karen Ghrawi	Unplaced		
2012	Baabda	Sonia-Lynn Gabriel	Unplaced	Miss World Top Model (Top 57)	Appointed — The 2nd Runner-up of Miss Lebanon 2011.
2011	Beirut	Yara Khoury-Mikhael	Unplaced	Beauty With A Purpose (Top 30)	
2010	Beirut	Rahaf Abdallah	Unplaced	Miss World Beach Beauty (Top 40)	
2009	Beirut	Martine Andraos	Unplaced	Miss World Talent (Top 22)	
2008	Beirut	Rosarita Tawil	Unplaced	Miss World Beach Beauty (Top 10); Miss World Top Model (Top 32)	
2007	Maaser El Chouf	Nadine Wilson Njeim	Unplaced	Miss World Beach Beauty (Top 21)	
2006	Ain El Remmaneh	Annabella Hilal	Top 17	World Dress Designer Award (Top 20)	Appointed — The 1st Runner-up of Miss Lebanon 2006.
2005	Beirut	Lamitta Frangieh	Unplaced	Miss World Beach Beauty (Top 19)	Appointed — The 1st Runner-up of Miss Lebanon 2004.
2004	Beirut	Nadine Nassib Njeim	Unplaced		
2003	Beirut	Marie-José Hnein	Top 20		
2002	—	Bethany Kehdy	Unplaced		Appointed — The 1st Runner-up of Miss Lebanon 2001.
2001	Bourj Hammoud	Christina Sawaya	Unplaced		
2000	Beirut	Sandra Rizk	Unplaced		
1999	Beirut	Norma Elias Naoum	Unplaced		
1998	Beirut	Clémence Achkar	Unplaced		
1997	Beirut	Joëlle Behlock	Top 10		
1996	—	Nisrine Sami Nasr	Unplaced		
1995	Beirut	Julia Syriani	Unplaced		Julia was Miss Universe Lebanon winner under LBC (allocated to compete in 1996), she also appointed, since the Miss Lebanon winner (under LBC) enabled to compete at Miss World competition.
1994	—	Lara Badawi	Unplaced		
1993	Beirut	Ghada El Turk	Unplaced		
1992	Beirut	Nicole Bardawil	Unplaced		
1991	Beirut	Diana Begdache	Unplaced		
Ministry of Tourism in Lebanon directorship — a franchise holder to Miss World between 1980―1988
Did not compete between 1989—1990
1988	Beirut	Sylvia Hobeika	Unplaced		Appointed ― one of runners-up of Miss Lebanon.
1987	Beirut	Josiane Haddad	Unplaced		
1986	Beirut	Mireille Abi Fares	Unplaced		Appointed ― one of runners-up of Miss Lebanon.
1985	Beirut	Mary Khoury	Unplaced		
1984	Beirut	Elaine Khoury	Unplaced		Appointed ― one of runners-up of Miss Lebanon.
1983	Beirut	Dochka Abi Nader	Unplaced		Appointed ― one of runners-up of Miss Lebanon.
1982	Beirut	May Mansour Chahwan	Unplaced		Appointed ― one of runners-up of Miss Lebanon.
1981	Beirut	Zeina Joseph Challita	Unplaced		
Raymond Loir (a founder of Miss Lebanon) directorship — a franchise holder to Miss World between 1960―1980: Miss Lebanon Committee was founded in 1960 by Raymond Loir, President of Foreign Press in the Middle East, press correspondent (Paris Match, France-Dimanche, Ici Paris, Écrits de Paris, Rivarol, Aspects de France, etc.). Following his death in 1980, a Ministry of Tourism in Lebanon took over the license.
1980	Beirut	Céleste Elias Asal	Unplaced		Appointed ― one of runners-up of Miss Lebanon.
1979	Beirut	Jacqueline Daou	Unplaced		
Did not compete in 1978
1977	Beirut	Vera Alouane	Unplaced		
Did not compete in 1976
1975	Beirut	Ramona Karam	Top 15		
1974	Beirut	Gisèle Hachem	Unplaced		
1973	Beirut	Sylvia Ohannessian	Top 15		
Did not compete between 1971—1972
1970	Beirut	Georgina Rizk	Unplaced		
1969	Beirut	Rola Mayzoub	Unplaced		Appointed ― one of runners-up of Miss Lebanon.
Did not compete in 1968
1967	Beirut	Sonia Fares	Unplaced		
1966	Beirut	Marlène Talih	Unplaced		
1965	Beirut	Yolla Georges Harb	Unplaced		
1964	—	Nana Barakat	Unplaced		
Did not compete between 1962—1963
1961	Beirut	Leila Antaki	Unplaced		
1960	—	Gisèle Nicholas Naser	Unplaced		Appointed ― one of runners-up of Miss Lebanon.

=== Miss Lebanon Emigrant ===
- : Declared as Winner
- : Ended as runner-up or top 5/6 qualification
- : Ended as one of the finalists or semifinalists
- : Ended as special awards winner

Year	Country of origin	Miss Lebanon Emigrant	Placement at Miss International	Special Awards	Notes
Pierre El Daher (chairman of LBCI) directorship — a franchise holder to Miss International between 1997―2018: Started in 2007 the main winner of Miss Lebanon Emigrant under LBCI goes to Miss International competition.
Did not compete since 2019—Present
2018	Australia	Rachel Younan	Unplaced		
2017	Cote d'Ivoire	Dima Safi	Unplaced		
2016	Mexico	Stephanie Dash Karam	Unplaced		
2015	Australia	Cynthia Farah	Unplaced		
2014	UAE	Lia Saad	Unplaced		
2013	Australia	Layla Yarak	Unplaced		
2012	Kuwait	Cynthia Moukarzel	Unplaced		
2011	Canada	Maria Farah	Top 15		
2010	Australia	Daniella Rahmé	Unplaced		
2009	Brazil	Sarah Barbosa Mansour	Unplaced		
2008	Australia	Jessica Michelle Kahawaty	Top 12		Later than Miss International 2008, Kahawaty went to Australia and won Miss World Australia 2012. At Miss World she placed as the 2nd Runner-up.
2007	—	Grace Beyani	Unplaced		
Did not compete since 2005—2006
2004	—	Nathalie Nasrallah	Unplaced		
Did not compete in 2003
2002	Bourj Hammoud	Christina Sawaya	Miss International 2002		
Did not compete in 2001
2000	—	Sahar El Ghazzawi	Unplaced		
1999	Beirut	Clémence Achkar	Unplaced		
Did not compete in 1998
1997	—	Nisrine Sami Naser	Unplaced		
Raymond Loir (a founder of Miss Lebanon) directorship — a franchise holder to Miss International between 1960―1977: Miss Lebanon Committee was founded in 1960 by Raymond Loir, President of Foreign Press in the Middle East, press correspondent (Paris Match, France-Dimanche, Ici Paris, Écrits de Paris, Rivarol, Aspects de France, etc.). Following his death in 1980, a Ministry of Tourism in Lebanon took over the license.
Did not compete between 1978—1996
1977	—	Katia Fakhry	Unplaced		
Did not compete in 1976
1975	—	Ramona Karam	Unplaced		
Did not compete between 1963—1974
1962	—	Mona Slim	Unplaced		
1961	―	Éleonore Abi Karam	Unplaced		
1960	—	Juliana Reptsik	Unplaced		

== See also ==
- Mister Lebanon
