= Maya Reaidy =

Lebanese model (born 1995)

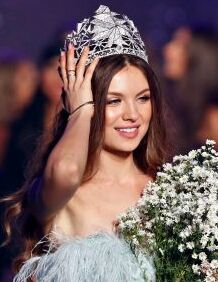
- Reaidy in 2018
- Born: Maya Reaidy; 14 November 1995 (age 30); Tannourine, Lebanon
- Education: Lebanese American University
- Occupations: Model, pharmacist
- Height: 1.73 m (5 ft 8 in)
- Beauty pageant titleholder
- Title: Miss Lebanon 2018
- Hair color: Brown
- Eye color: Blue
- Major competitions: Miss Lebanon 2018 (Winner); Miss Universe 2018 (Unplaced)

Maya Reaidy (Arabic: مايا رعيدي, born 14 November 1995) is a Lebanese model and beauty pageant titleholder who was crowned Miss Lebanon 2018. She represented Lebanon at the Miss Universe 2018 pageant in Bangkok, Thailand.

== Personal life ==
Reaidy was born and raised in Tannourine. She went to Jesus and Mary Collège, then to an Evangelical School in Lebanon. She studied pharmacy at Lebanese American University in Beirut. Reaidy is a ballet dancer, enjoys practicing yoga and declares herself to be a vegetarian. She credited Amal Clooney as being one of the inspiring public figures she admires the most for her fight for women's rights. She now resides in London, United Kingdom.

On May 5, 2024, she married her fiancé in London. The identity of her husband has not been revealed.

== Pageantry ==
=== Miss Lebanon 2018 ===
Reaidy was crowned as Miss Lebanon 2018 held at the Forum de Beyrouth on September 30, 2018 and broadcast on MTV Lebanon. At the question round, Reaidy was asked by composer Guy Manoukian what makes her different from other candidates. She replied: What sets me apart from other candidates is that I am a diplomatic person. I try to understand people instead of criticizing. This sets me apart especially in today's society. In the top 5, Reaidy was asked what was her biggest failure in life. She answered that failure was a necessary step in life in order to succeed. The judging panel consisted of TV host George Kurdahi, singer Nancy Ajram, Miss Lebanon 2004 Nadine Nassib Njeim, actor Adel Karam, designer Nicolas Jebran, composer Guy Manoukian and Miss Universe 2017 Demi-Leigh Nel-Peters, among others. Reaidy wore a sky blue feathered dress designed by Nicolas Jebran. She succeeded Miss Lebanon 2017, Perla Helou. After the show, Lebanese social media users compared her to Georgina Rizk, the only Lebanese beauty queen to win the title of Miss Universe in 1971. It has been pointed out that Reaidy and Miss Russia 2018 Yulia Polyachikhina bear a striking resemblance.

Reaidy wants to use the Miss Lebanon platform to be a women's rights advocate and to increase knowledge and awareness of women who are unaware of their rights in Lebanon, emphasizing that Lebanese mothers cannot pass on their nationalities to their children. As Miss Lebanon, she is also involved in the Step Together Association, supporting the protection of the rights of children with special needs and participating in activities with the students. Reaidy was invited to the United Arab Emirates Embassy in Lebanon and met with the ambassador H.E. Dr. Hamad Bin Saeed Al Shamsi in order to participate in the launching of a new initiative to spread awareness about breast cancer.

On October 1, 2018, Reaidy's first television appearance was on Menna W Jerr TV show hosted by Pierre Rabbat and broadcast on MTV (Lebanon). Reaidy is featured on her first cover magazine for women's lifestyle magazine Zahrat Al Khaleej, appearing alongside former Miss USA Rima Fakih and Miss Universe 2017 Demi-Leigh Nel-Peters. As part of her Miss Universe preparation, Reaidy flew to Los Angeles for one week of intensive training organized by Miss Lebanon Director Rima Fakih, including photoshoots, wardrobe fittings and casting call at Arab American Casting. She was given motivational speeches by Miss USA 2009 Kristen Dalton, Miss Guam Universe 2010 Brittany Bell and Miss Wyoming USA 2010 Claire Schreiner. On November 3, 2018, she was featured on the cover of Femme Magazine.

=== Miss Universe 2018 ===
Reaidy represented Lebanon at Miss Universe 2018 pageant in Bangkok, Thailand. Out of 94 contestants, Miss Lebanon and Miss Egypt were the only contestants from the Arab world competing in the 67th edition of Miss Universe. At the Evening Gown Preliminary Competition, Miss Universe Lebanon 2018 wore a silver and light purple dress designed by Nicolas Jebran. At the National Costume Show, Reaidy chose to represent her homeland by paying tribute to the cedar tree and wore a metallic gold bodysuit with arm pieces and matching thigh-high boots.

On January 11, 2019, she appeared as a guest on Beit el Kell entertainment show presented by Adel Karam to clarify the controversy.

Awards and achievements
Preceded by Perla Helou	Miss Lebanon; 2018	Succeeded by Yasmina Zaytoun
