= Al Hayba =

Lebanese - Syrian television series

- Genre: Drama
- Created by: Sabbah Brothers; Cedars Art Production
- Developed by: Samer Al Barkawi
- Written by: Hozan Akko; Basem Al Salka
- Directed by: Samer Al Barkawi
- Starring: Taim Hasan; Muna Wassef; Rouzaina Lazkani; Oweiss Mkhallalati; Abdo Chahine; Nadine Nassib Njeim; Valerie Abou Chacra; Cyrine Abdelnour; Nicole Saba; Dima Kandalaft; Said Serhan; Aimée Sayah; Khalil Sehnaoui
- Countries of origin: Syria and Lebanon
- Original language: Arabic
- No. of seasons: 5
- No. of episodes: 120

Production
- Executive producers: Ali and Sadek Sabbah Ziad El Khatib
- Producer: Sabbah Brothers
- Production location: Lebanese village near the Lebanese Mountain
- Running time: 45 minutes

Original release
- Network: MBC and MTV Lebanon
- Release: 27 May 2017 – 2021

Al Hayba (Arabic: الهيبة) is an Arabic drama television series directed by Samer Al Barkawi and produced by Ziad El Khatib. It has 5 seasons, and Taim Hasan, named "Jabal Sheikh Al Jabal" is the lead character in all 5 seasons. The series first aired on Middle East Broadcasting Center (MBC) to the Arab world on 27 May 2017. As an Arab Ramadan series, the drama is released during the month of Ramadan. Season 2 was released on MBC in May 2018. Netflix picked up season 1 and provided English, Chinese, Hebrew, French, Spanish, Turkish and Greek dubbing.

The series is set in a fictional village of "Hayba" which is the origin place of the Sheikh Al Jabal Clan.

== Plot ==
The story follows the members of a fictional Arab family, Sheikh Al Jabal, that controls all the smuggling routes between Lebanon and Syria. The family has an ongoing historic feud with another powerful family, the Saeed clan in the village of Hayba. The two families constantly struggle against one another, along with internal strife. However, with stories that never end and wounds that never heal, how will this family survive in this lawless village? The story develops over the 5 seasons with new characters and enemies entering the line.

== Cast ==
Character	Actor	Actor's name in Arabic script
Jabal Sheikh Al Jabal	Taim Hasan	تيم حسن
Nahed Omran	Muna Wassef	منى واصف
Sakher Sheikh Al Jabal	Oweiss Mkhallalati	أويس مخللاتي
Mona Sheikh Al Jabal	Rouzaina Lazkani	روزينا لاذقاني
Chahine Sheikh Al Jabal	Abdo Chahine	عبدو شاهين
Alia (Season 1)	Nadine Nassib Njeim	نادين نسيب نجيم
Maryam (Season 2)	Valerie Abou Chacra	فاليري أبو شقرا
Sumaya Al Said (Season 2)	Nicole Saba	نيكول سابا
Nour Rahma (Season 3)	Cyrine Abdelnour	سيرين عبد النور
Ali Sheikh Al Jabal (Season 3 and onwards)	Said Serhan	سعيد سرحان
Al Shayeb (Abu Talal Sheikh Al Jabal)	Mohamad Akil	محمد عقيل
Majdi	Michael Hourani	ميشال حوراني
Dr. Ghada Khoury	Carla Boutros	كارلا بطرس
Hanaa Sheikh Al Jabal (Ghazi’s wife, mother of Chahine and Rima)	Kitam Alaham	ختام اللحام
Rima Sheikh Al Jabal	Zeinab Hind Khadra	زينب هند خضرة
Ali's Mother	Layla Qamri	ليلى قمري
Jamal Omran (Maternal Uncle of Jabal)	Najah Safkouni	نجاح سفكوني
Ghazi Sheikh Al Jabal (Jabal's paternal uncle, & father of Chahine)	Khalid Alsayed	خالد السيد
Nemr Al Said (Season 4)	Adel Karam	عادل كرم
Essa "the attorney"	Patrick Mu barak	باتريك مبارك
Dr. Hans Nieltsen (Season 5)	Khalil Sehnaoui	خليل صحناوي
Marwa	Walaa Alazzam	ولاء العزام
Rania Emran (Daughter of Jamal Emran)	Dima Kandalaft	ديمة قندلفت

== Reception ==
In 2017, Sabbah Brothers announced that the 1st season of Al Hayba was successfully received in the MENA region, reaching 116.7 million viewers. Fadi Ismail, MBC group drama director, comments "The plot was also tied to a feudal culture, which has emotional resonance throughout the region."

=== Criticism ===
In 2018, a lawsuit was filed against the show, alleging that it promoted stereotypes of Baalbek as criminal, including widespread drug use and violence. In response, Cedars Art Production referenced the show's disclaimer that all details are fictional. Viewers have linked the show's fictional setting to Baalbeck due to proximity to the Syrian border, use of regional dialect, and history of familial conflicts.

Lead actress in season 3, Cyrine Abdelnour's character Noor Rahme is a TV presenter with a politically powerful friend of benefit who helped her gain publicity and this created controversy as the public were saying that this promotes the idea that Lebanese TV presenters all use powerful figures to get publicity. Cyrine Abdelnour later said that this isn't the case.

Lead actress in season 1, Nadine Nassib Njeim turned down the season 2 contract due to lack of her role's prominence and described the show as a predominantly male story.

Critics claim that an episode in which actor Taim Hasan's character beats his wife Sumaya, played by Nicole Saba, normalizes domestic violence.

== Season 1 ==
The events of season 1 take place after the second season chronologically. Season 1 follows the story of Alia (played by Nadine Nassib Njeim), an Arab woman that lives in Canada with her son Joe (Jabal Jr), and her husband Adel. Adel was born to the infamous crime family of Sheikh Al Jabal. Adel passes away in Canada and based on his wishes is brought to Hayba for burial. Adel's family are of the prominent Sheikh Al Jabal clan located in Hayba. When Alia meets her deceased husband's family they want to keep her child with them. Her mother-in-law stipulates that she can only stay with her son if she marries her eldest son, Jabal Sr (played by Taim Hasan), Alia's deceased husband's brother. Alia lodges a complaint against the family at the Canadian embassy. Through a series of events, Alia falls in love with Jabal Senior who has many enemies that he, Alia, and his family must face. The season ends with Jabal publicly executing the eldest son of the rival family (Saeed clan) after causing trouble and leading the police to the village of Hayba, all leading up to the events of the third season.

== Season 2 ==
This season is set 2 years before Season 1. Jabal's father (Sultan Sheikh Al Jabal) and his brother (Adel Sheikh Al Jabal - Alia's husband) are still alive. His paternal uncle Ghazi Sheikh Al Jabal (Schahin's father) is not imprisoned. The season provides context for the feudal and interfamilial strife in season 1. After the assassination of Sultan Sheikh Al Jabal on Jabal's wedding day to Maryam (Valerie Abou Chacra) Jabal thinks that the Saeeds set the assassination plan so his brother Adel assassinated Suleiman Saeed, the head of the Saeed clan. The families ignite a bloody war against each other, which ended with a truce on the condition that Jabal marries Suleiman Saeed's daughter, Sumaya (Nicole Saba). Maryam is devastated and decides to go abroad. Jabal got caught on smuggling and served 2 years in prison. After escaping from prison and returning to Hayba, the village is controlled by Nazem Aali that controls all rackets, arms smuggling, and prostitution in Hayba. Jabal tries to bring Hayba back to the old happy village and he succeeded for most parties. Schahin discovers the identity of Sultan's hitman and discovers that Nazem was behind the conspiracy not Suleiman. Haulo, Nazem's man that is in charge of the criminal activities of the Aali clan is killed by Jabal after lots of struggle. With Nazem's Empire collapsed, Hayba gets back to the hands of Jabal.

== Season 3 ==
This season is set after season 1, after Chahine (Played by Abdo Chahine) is shot and everyone thinks he is dead however Izzat realises he is alive and takes him to a hospital in Beirut with Jabal in secrecy. Jabal then spends his time in Beirut and he meets Nour, (played by Cyrine Abdelnour) a well known host of a TV show. They both live on the same floor of the apartment building and they begin to fall deeply in love with each other. Ali (played by Said Serhan), who is the son of Izzat comes back to Hayba as a part of the Sheikh Al Jabals and he falls in love with the new maid, Marwa, who had previously came to Jabals house after her husband had died (as Marwa's husband was one of Jabal's men). Ghazi Sheikh Al Jabal is released from prison and vet himself as the head of the Sheikh Al Jabal Clan and also as the head of the Hayba Mafia. Ghazi attempts to kill Sakhr, Jabal's brother, as he thinks that Chahine (who is his son) has died. Then, Chahine appears and the whole Hayba knows that he has survived. Schahin marries Muna, Jabal’s sister. Tharwat, Noor's friend of benefit was a barrier to Jabal to get to Noor, and Ghazi was more like an enemy than an uncle. Then Zaidan's right-hand man that wants to control Hayba with Jabal's uncle, Jamal Omran. With Jabal surrounded by traitors and enemies, Jabal attempts to kill them all, and he does. Jabal marries Noor after a lot of obstacles tried to stop them. In the final episode of the series Jabal is shot inside Izzat’s car with Noor and his son, Sultan. Jabal survives but Noor and his son die.

== Season 4 ==
In 2019, Season 4 (The Response) of Al Hayba was announced, starring Taim Hassan as Jabal Sheikh al Jabal, Dima Kandalaft, as Rania Emran and Adel Karam as Nemr Saeed.

== Season 5 ==
In 2020, Season 5 was announced to be the final season of Al Hayba, starring Taim Hassan as Jabal Sheikh al Jabal and Aimée Sayah as Sara.

== Broadcast ==
Country	Channel	Series premiere	Language	Title	Seasons released
Middle East	Middle East Broadcasting Center and MTV Lebanon	May 2017	Arabic	Al Hayba	Season 1
Internationally	Shahid (streaming platform)	October 2021	Arabic	Al Hayba	Season 5
Iran	MBC Persia	July 2020	Persian	اعتبار	Season 2
Internationally	Netflix	September 2018	Arabic (English, French, Spanish, Chinese dubbed)	Al Hayba	Season 1, 2, 3, 4, 5
