= Nour Arida =

American-Lebanese model (born 1989)

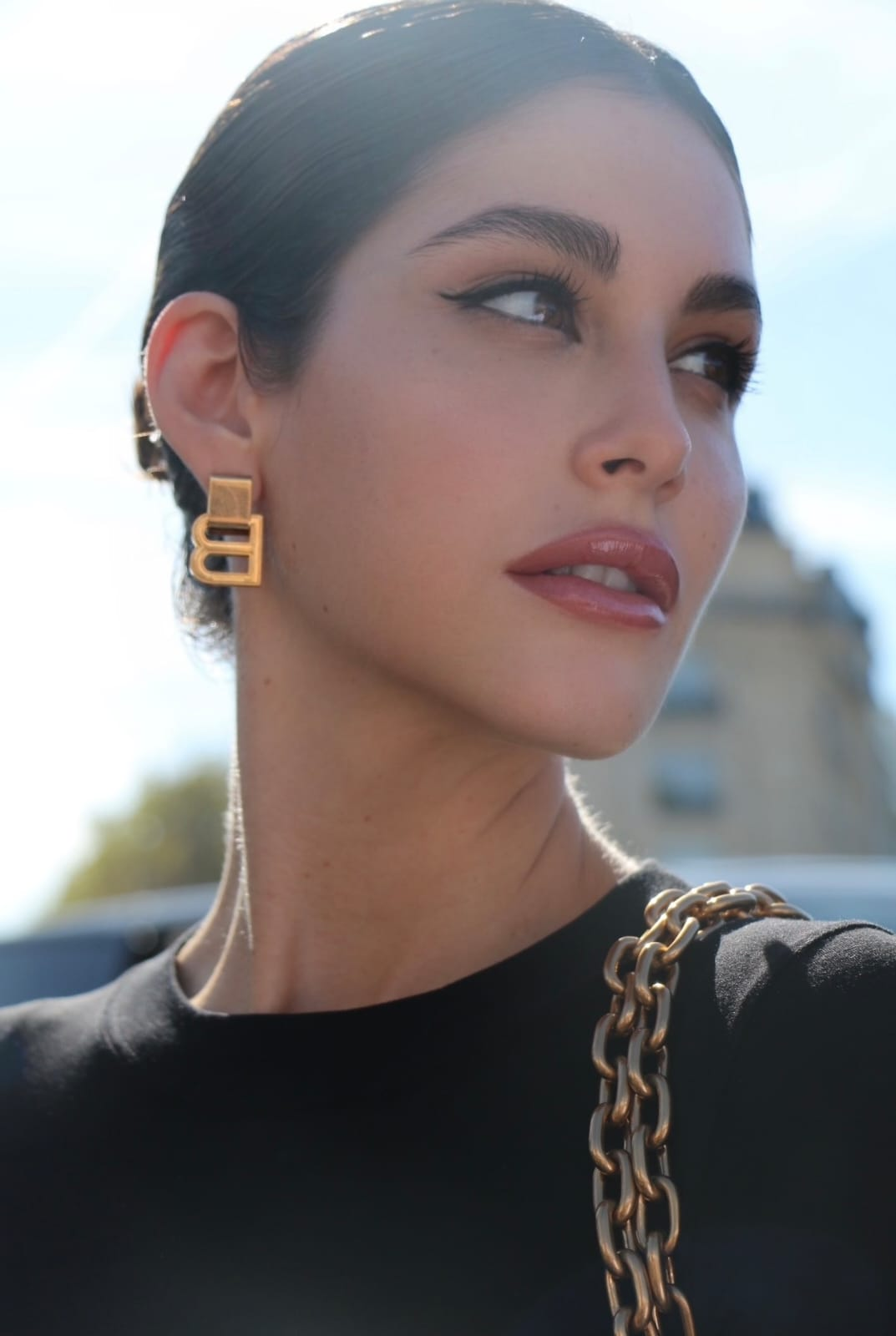
- Born: 10 July 1989 (age 36); Maryland, United States
- Occupations: Model, Brand Ambassador
- Height: 175 cm (5 ft 9 in)

Nour Carla Arida is an American Lebanese model and brand ambassador.

Nour is also one of the jury members of Miss Lebanon 2024.

== Early life and education ==
Nour was born on 10 July 1989 in Maryland, United States to a Lebanese family. She was raised in Beirut and pursued her studies in Economics and Mathematics at the American University of Beirut. At the age of 20 she started her career in the fashion industry. She moved to Paris after the 2020 Beirut explosion.

== Career ==
At the age of 28, Nour Arida was signed with Elite in Paris. She is one of the most influential women in the Middle East, having more than 16 million followers across her social media platforms.

She has become one of the very few Arab women fronting global campaigns for international brands such as Boucheron, Sephora, and Make Up For Ever.

Nour has appeared on the cover of regional and international magazines such as Vogue Turkey, Harper's Bazaar Arabia, L'Officiel Paris, L'Officiel Arabia, Elle Arabia, and Mojeh.

She starred in a television show in 2017 on E! channel. In 2019, Nour co-created her own lipstick (a limited edition release) with MAC Cosmetics.

Nour Arida has been walking runways at Paris Fashion Week shows for many years. She walked for notable brands such as Zadig & Voltaire, Etam, Maison Rabih Keyrouz and Nicolas Jebran.

She also launched a kidswear brand called Generation Peace in 2020, and was considered as one of the pioneers on social media, as per Forbes US.

Nour attended Cannes Film Festival in 2021 and 2022 as the global ambassador of the French jewellery house Boucheron. She also attended Venice Film Festival in 2022.

== Awards ==
- Arab Woman of the Year Award in London
- Global Advocate of Women's Rights Award - Biaf 2024
