= Mister Lebanon =

National male beauty pageant competition in Lebanon

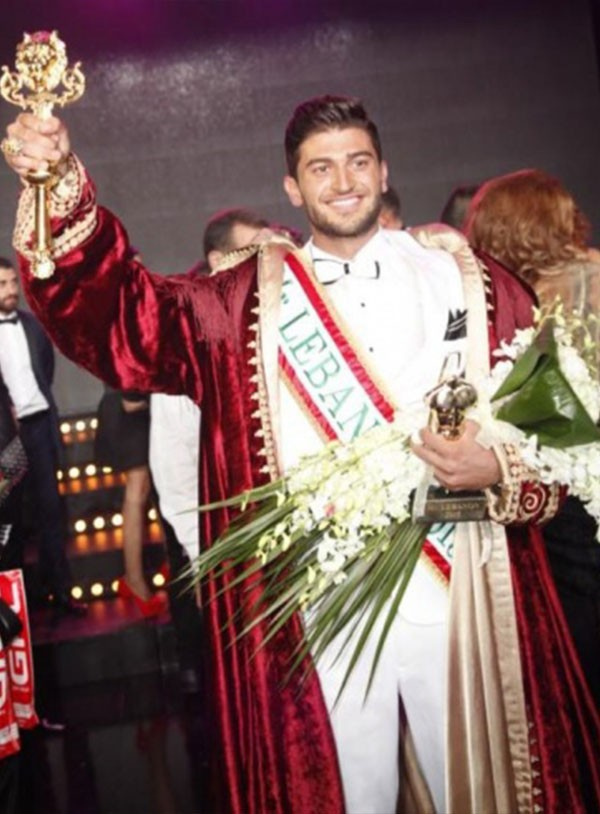
- Farid Matar – Mr Lebanon 2015
- Formation: 1995; 31 years ago
- Type: Male pageant
- Headquarters: Beirut
- Location: Lebanon
- Members: Mister World; Mister International; Manhunt International; Mister Grand International
- Official language: Arabic, English
- Organization: Lebanese Ministry of Tourism
- Website: Mister Lebanon Website

Mister Lebanon (Arabic: مستر ليبانون) is a male pageant which is held annually to select a young man who takes on humanitarian duties and represents Lebanon in international beauty pageants, most notably Mister International. The first Mister Lebanon competition was held in 1995 and concluded with crowning Hadi Esta. Rami Atallah was crowned Mister Lebanon for 2018.

== History ==
Mister Lebanon winners often graduate from the pageant circuit to become models, actors or TV hosts. Lebanese titleholders proved considerable performances at international pageants, placing almost every year since the launching of the male beauty pageantry, leading the world to classify Arab men generally, and Lebanese men particularly.

The competition is sponsored by Lebanese Tourism Services which has often contracted with modeling agencies, most notably Nidal's Agency to assign representatives instead of throwing competitions, due to special circumstances such as the 2006 Lebanon War.

Many of the Mister Lebanon winners and competitors went to become celebrities of wide fame and popularity. Ghassan Mawla dominated throughout 2004–2007 with many reality television appearances, a music album and some successful enterprises. In 2012, Wissam Hanna placed fifth in the Arabic version of Dancing with the Stars. The latter and fellow Miss Lebanon winner Rosarita Tawil brought the pageant circuit in Lebanon to massive media and public attention through the show. Asaad Tarabay, Abdel Rahman Bala and Ali Hammoud began successful careers in the modeling and fitness domains after their highly publicized wins.

== International crowns ==
- Three – Mister International winners:
  - Wissam Hanna (2006)
  - Ali Hammoud (2012)
  - Paul Iskandar (2016)
- One – Mister United Continents winner:
  - Kamel Raad (2015)
- One – Mister Grand International winner:
  - Seif Al Walid Harb (2023)

== Titleholders ==
The winner of Mister Lebanon represents his country at Mister International. On occasion, when the winner does not qualify (due to age) for either contest, a runner-up is sent. Previously, in some instances the winner has also competed at another pageant.

Mister Lebanon
1995	Hadi Esta	1997	Ghassan Mawla	1998	Steve Basmadjian	2000	Omar Meyho	2001	Aziz Abdo
2003	Asaad Tarabay	2004	Anthony Hakim	2005	Wissam Hanna	2007	Basel Bou Hamdan	2008	Mohamed Chamseddine
2009	Abdel Rahman Bala	2010	Roy Emad	2011	Mohamed Hay	2012	Rudolphe Bou Nader	2013	Ayman Moussa
2014	Rabih Zein	2015	Farid Matar	2016	Paul Iskandar	2017	Michael Khoury	2018	Rami Atallah
2019	Mohamed Sandakli	2021	Hady Fakhreddine	2023	Seif El Walid Harb	2024	Mario El Hajj	2025	Saadeddine Hneineh
2026	Abed Semaan								

=== List of Mister Lebanon at International pageants ===
Color key

- : Declared as Winner
- : Ended as Runner-up
- : Ended as one of the Finalists or Semifinalists

Year	Mister World	Mister International	Manhunt International	Mister Grand International	Mister United Continents
1996	Hadi Esta				
1998	Ghassan Mawla				
1999		James Ghoril (1st Runner-up)			
2000	Omar Mehyo (Top 10)				
2003	Asaad Tarabay (1st Runner-up)				
2005			Wissam Hanna (Top 15) (Mister Photogenic)		
2006		Wissam Hanna (WINNER) (Best National Costume)	Rafic Bou Zeid		
2007	Anthony Hakim (Top 12)	Basel Bou Hamdan (4th Runner-up) (Best National Costume)	Pedro Kiwan (Top 15)		
2008		Mohamed Chamseddine (1st Runner-up)			
2009		Marcelino Gebrayel (2nd Runner-up)			
2010	Abdel Rahman Bala (Top 5)	Mohamed Ali Arabi	Murad Mouawad (Top 15)		
2011		Mohamed Hay	Marcelino Gebrayel		
2012	Rudolphe Bou Nader (Top 10)	Ali Hammoud (WINNER)	Elie Najem		
2013		Firas Abbas			
2014	Ayman Moussa	Rabih Zein (1st Runner-up)			
2015		Farid Matar (Top 15)			Kamel Raad (WINNER)
2016		Paul Iskandar (WINNER)	Bilel Zaweel (Top 16)		
2017		Michael Khoury (Top 16)	Gaetan Osman (2nd Runner-up)		
2018		Mohamed Taha	Patrick Dahrieh (Top 16)		
2019	Jean-Paul Bitar (Top 12)				
2022		Hadi Fakhreddine			
2023		Seif Al Walid Harb (Top 20)		Seif Al Walid Harb (WINNER)	
2024	Mario El Hajj (Top 20)	Rawad Aboutine	Abed Semaa (Top 20)		
2025		Saadeddine Hneineh (1st Runner-up)			
2026		Omar Beyrouthy			

== See also ==
- Miss Lebanon
