= Miss Lebanon 2022 =

61st edition of Miss Lebanon

- Date: July 24, 2022
- Presenters: Aimée Sayah
- Entertainment: Nancy Ajram; Toni-Ann Singh
- Venue: Forum de Beyrouth, Beirut
- Broadcaster: LBCI
- Entrants: 17
- Placements: 9
- Winner: Yasmina Zaytoun
- Congeniality: Maya Aboul Hosn
- Confidence: Christina Nakhlé

Miss Lebanon 2022 was the 61st edition of the Miss Lebanon pageant, held on July 24, 2022, at the Forum de Beyrouth in Beirut. The event was broadcast live on LBCI and was hosted by Aimée Sayah, with musical performances by Nancy Ajram and Toni-Ann Singh. A total of seventeen contestants competed for the national title.

At the conclusion of the pageant, the outgoing titleholder, Maya Reaidy, crowned Yasmina Zaytoun as her successor. Meanwhile, Maya Aboul Hosn, who finished as first runner-up, was appointed as Miss Universe Lebanon 2023 the following year. Members of the Miss World organization was present at the event, including CEO and chairperson Julia Morley, Stephen Douglas Morley, reigning Miss World 2021 Karolina Bielawska, her first runner-up, Miss World Americas 2021 and Beauty With A Purpose Ambassador Shree Saini, second runner-up and Miss World Africa 2021 Olivia Yacé, and Miss World 2019 Toni-Ann Singh.

As Miss Lebanon 2022, Zaytoun represented Lebanon at the Miss Universe 2022 competition, held in New Orleans, Louisiana, on January 14, 2023, and at the Miss World 2023 pageant, held in Mumbai, Maharashtra, on March 9, 2024.

== Results ==
=== Placements ===
Results	Contestant	International Placements
Miss Lebanon 2022	17 – Yasmina Zaytoun	
Miss Lebanon 2022	17 – Yasmina Zaytoun	(Unplaced) – Miss Universe 2022; (1st Runner-up) – Miss World 2023
1st Runner-Up	14 – Maya Aboul Hosn	(Unplaced) — Miss Universe 2023
2nd Runner-Up	7 – Jacintha Rached	
3rd Runner-Up	9 – Lara Hraoui	
4th Runner-Up	6 – Dalal Hoballah	
Top 9	1 – Agatha Saify; 10 – Lynn Massoud; 11 – Maria Chouchany; 15 – Natalia Sayed	

== Contestants ==
No.	Name	Age	Height	Hometown	Placements
1	Agatha Saify	22	1.76 m (5 ft 9 1/2 in)	Al-Qoubaiyat	Top 9
2	Céline Saliba	25	1.69 m (5 ft 6 1/2 in)	Jounieh	
3	Chanel El Amil	24	1.73 m (5 ft 8 in)	Rmaich	
4	Chloe Haouchab	25	1.67 m (5 ft 5 1/2 in)	Bekaa Kafra	
5	Christina Nakhlé	22	1.70 m (5 ft 7 in)	Aana	
6	Dalal Hoballah	21	1.83 m (6 ft 0 in)	Tyre	4th Runner-Up
7	Jacintha Rached	27	1.75 m (5 ft 9 in)	Wadi Deir Dourite	2nd Runner-Up
8	Jacintha Arab	20	1.70 m (5 ft 7 in)	Ardeh	
9	Lara Hraoui	24	1.80 m (5 ft 11 in)	Baskinta	3rd Runner-Up
10	Lynn Massoud	20	1.68 m (5 ft 6 in)	Zgharta	Top 9
11	Maria Chouchany	23	1.71 m (5 ft 7 1/2 in)	Beirut	Top 9
12	Mariană Sakr	26	1.68 m (5 ft 6 in)	Hadchit	
13	Marwa Makki	26	1.76 m (5 ft 9 1/2 in)	Deir Ez Zahrani	
14	Maya Aboul Hosn	24	1.67 m (5 ft 5 1/2 in)	Btekhnay	Miss Universe Lebanon 2023 1st Runner-Up
15	Natalia Sayed	26	1.73 m (5 ft 8 in)	Sidon	Top 9
16	Sylvana Deeb	27	1.76 m (5 ft 9 1/2 in)	Beit Chlala	
17	Yasmina Zaytoun	19	1.67 m (5 ft 5 1/2 in)	Kfarchouba	Miss Lebanon 2022

== Judges ==
- Michel Fadel – Composer
- Karen Wazen – Influencer
- Mohamad Yehya – General manager, IP Studios
- Karolina Bielawska – Miss World 2021 from Poland
- Julia Morley – Chairwoman and CEO of the Miss World Organization (Took over from Karolina Bielawska after feeling unwell)
- Nayla Tueni – An-Nahar general manager
- Ivan Caracalla – Caracalla theater director
- Hilda Khalife – TV host
- Samaya Chedrawi – Miss Universe Lebanon 1993
