= Marlène Talih =

Lebanese beauty pageant titleholder

- Born: Lebanon
- Beauty pageant titleholder
- Title: Miss Lebanon 1966
- Major competition: Miss World 1966

Marlène Talih is a Lebanese beauty pageant titleholder who was crowned Miss Lebanon 1966. She competed for the Miss World 1966 title on 17 November 1966 at the Lyceum Ballroom in London.
