= Karen Ghrawi =

Lebanese beauty pageant titleholder and interior designer

- Born: 10 July 1991 (age 35); Beirut, Lebanon
- Height: 1.75 m (5 ft 9 in)
- Beauty pageant titleholder
- Title: Miss Lebanon 2013
- Hair color: Brown
- Eye color: Hazel
- Major competitions: Miss Lebanon 2013 (Winner); Miss Universe 2013 (Unplaced); Miss World 2013 (Unplaced)

Karen Ghrawi (Arabic: كارين غراوي; born 10 July 1991) is a Lebanese beauty pageant titleholder and interior designer who was crowned Miss Lebanon 2013. She represented Lebanon at the Miss Universe 2013 in Russia/Moscow and Miss World 2013 in Indonesia/Bali pageants.

== Early life ==
Her hobbies include swimming, cooking and traveling. She had an interest in interior design.

== Miss Lebanon 2013 ==
Ghrawi was crowned Miss Lebanon 2013 on Sunday 1 September. The beauty pageant was hosted by journalist and TV personality Dima Sadek and aired on LBCI and LDC. She competed at Miss Universe 2013 and Miss World 2013, but was unplaced in both pageants.

During the Miss Lebanon 2014 beauty pageant, she tripped on her high heels and fell on stage during her final walk, just before handing over her crown to Saly Greige. The clip of her fall quickly went viral and was included in the "Top Five Celebrities Slipping off the Stage" list by MTV.

== See also ==
- Miss Lebanon

Awards and achievements
Preceded by Rina Chibany	Miss Lebanon; 2013	Succeeded by Saly Greige
