= Miss Lebanon 2017 =

59th edition of Miss Lebanon

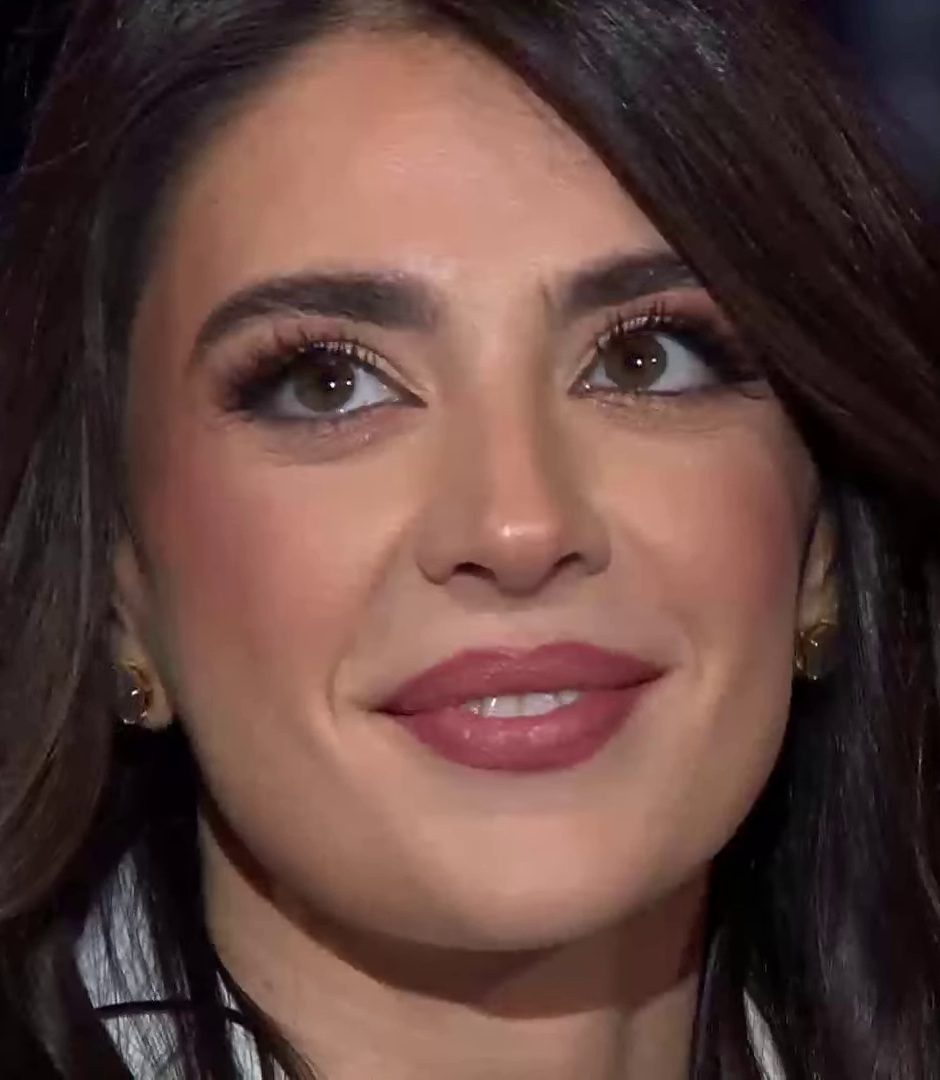
- Perla Helou, Miss Lebanon 2017
- Date: September 24, 2017
- Venue: Casino du Liban, Jounieh
- Broadcaster: Lebanese Broadcasting Corporation International
- Entrants: 16
- Placements: 10
- Winner: Perla Helou (Baabda)
- Miss Universe Lebanon: Jane Sader (Sidon)
- Miss Influential Lebanon: Reem khoury (Miziara)

Miss Lebanon 2017 the 59th edition of the Miss Lebanon pageant, was held on September 24, 2017 at Casino du Liban in Jounieh 16 candidates from different regions & cities of Lebanon competed for the national crown. Perla helou winner of the pageant represented Lebanon at the Miss World 2017 meanwhile the Miss Universe Lebanon and Miss International Lebanon competed at Miss Universe 2017 and Miss International 2017, respectively.

== Placements ==
Final results	Candidates
Miss Lebanon 2017	Baabda - Perla Helou
1st Runner-Up	Sidon - Jana Sader
2nd Runner-Up	Mount Lebanon - Sabine Najem
3rd Runner-Up	Miziara - Reem Khoury
4th Runner-Up	Beqaa - Yousra Mohsen
Top 9	Nabatieh - Daria El Jurdi; North Lebanon - Mariam Hayek; Zgharta - Carole Kahwagi; Tripoli - Mireille Barrak

=== Special awards ===
- Miss Photogenic - Perla Helou (Baabda)
- Miss Influential - Reem khoury (Miziara)

== Officials Candidates ==
Represented	Candidate	Age
Akkar	Aman Gedeon	22
Baabda	Perla Helou	22
Miziara	Reem Khoury	22
Beirut Province	Niveen Matar	19
Beqaa	Yousra Mohsen	19
Byblos	Marita Nicolas	18
Jounieh	Lucie Munayer	20
Mount Lebanon	Sabine Najem	25
Nabatieh	Daria El Jurdi	19
North Lebanon	Mariam Hayek	26
Sidon	Jana Sader	20
Tripoli	Mireille Barrak	18
Tyre	Eva Mouawad	22
Zahle	Elsa Boustany	21
Zgharta	Carole Kahwagi	23
