= Saly Greige =

Lebanese TV host (born 1989)

- Born: Saly Greige; October 17, 1989 (age 37); Darshmizzine, Koura District, Lebanon
- Height: 1.70 m (5 ft 7 in)
- Beauty pageant titleholder
- Title: Miss Lebanon 2014
- Hair color: Brown
- Eye color: Blue
- Major competitions: Miss Lebanon 2014 (Winner); Miss World 2014 (Unplaced); Miss Universe 2014 (Unplaced)

Saly Greige (Arabic: سالي جريج) is a Lebanese engineer, TV host and beauty pageant titleholder who was crowned Miss Lebanon 2014. She represented Lebanon at Miss World 2014 and Miss Universe 2014. She then worked as a TV host in Lebanon and in Dubai, hosting one of the most reputable TV shows in the middle “The Insider” on Dubai TV.

== Career ==
Greige studied civil engineering at the University of Balamand. She was crowned as Miss Lebanon 2014 on October 5, 2014. Elsa Hajjar came in the second place and Rouba Monzer won the 2nd runner up. In January 2015, Greige came under criticism in her country for appearing in a photograph with Miss Israel, Doron Matalon, at the Miss Universe pageant in Miami, United States.

In 2017, she became a TV host of Sahtak Bildini at LBCI, then The Insider at Dubai TV in 2019.

== Personal life ==
She married a lawyer, Toni Khouri, in 2015, and had her first child, Ray, in May 2018 in Dubai. In June 2021, she had her second son, James, at Houston Methodist Hospital.

Awards and achievements
Preceded by Karen Ghrawi	Miss Lebanon; 2014	Succeeded by Valerie Abou Chacra
