= Christina Sawaya =

Lebanese singer, actress and TV host

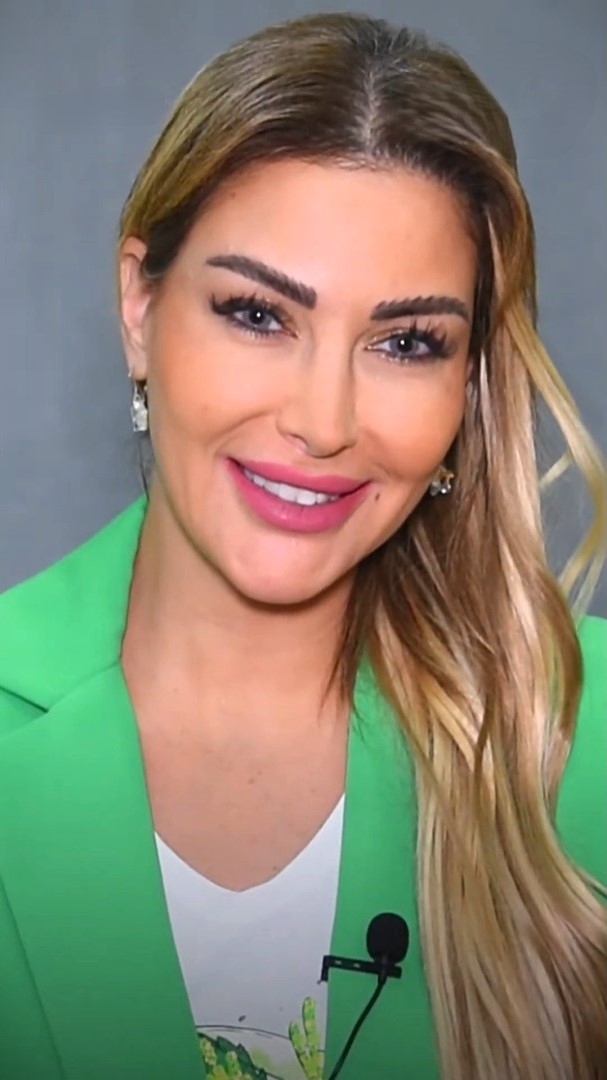
- Sawaia in 2023
- Born: Christina Sawaya; 16 August 1980 (age 46); Beirut, Lebanon
- Education: Lebanese American University
- Occupations: Singer Actress and TV Host
- Height: 1.82 m (5 ft 11 1/2 in)
- Beauty pageant titleholder
- Title: Miss Lebanon 2001 & 2002; Miss International 2002
- Major competitions: Miss Lebanon 2001 (Winner); Miss World 2001 (Unplaced); Miss International 2002 (Winner)

Christina Sawaya (Arabic: كريستينا صوايا; born 16 August 1981) is a Lebanese singer, actress and television host who won the Miss International 2002 pageant.

== Career ==
She started her career as master of ceremony for big events. She participated in a series of pageants between 1998 and 2002 in which she became the winner of Miss Universities Lebanon in 1998, and was chosen as "Top Model of Lebanon 1999".

In 2001, Sawaya competed against 19 women to become Miss Lebanon 2001 and 2002, where she won and became eligible to compete in the Miss Universe, Miss World and Miss International pageants. She then represented her country in the Miss World 2001 pageant, wherein she was unplaced. But at the Miss Universe 2002 Pageant, Sawaya decided to drop out of the competition due to the raid in Palestine.

She won the Miss International 2002 contest in Tokyo, Japan on September 30, 2002 which had 52 contestants.

She also became the first Miss International winner from Middle Eastern descent. In the same year, Miss World 2002 was Azra Akın from Turkey and the original winner of Miss Earth 2002 was Džejla Glavović from Bosnia and Herzegovina, which are all hailed from dominant Muslim countries.

== Personal life ==
Sawaya is a conservative Catholic Christian that comes from Lebanon, the only Arab country where the president is Christian by the constitution.

On 15 November 2003, Sawaya married Tony Baroud in Beirut and they had two children. The couple divorced in 2015.

Awards and achievements
Preceded by (Poland) Małgorzata Rożniecka	Miss International; 2002	Succeeded by (Venezuela) Goizeder Azúa
