= Sonia Fares =

Lebanese fashion designer

- Born: September 6, 1949 (age 77); Beirut, Lebanon
- Occupation: fashion designer
- Parent(s): Gerges Fares; Iman Attieh
- Beauty pageant titleholder
- Title: Miss Lebanon 1967
- Major competitions: Miss Lebanon 1967 (Winner); Miss World 1967 (Unplaced); Miss Universe 1968 (Unplaced)

Sonia Fares is a Lebanese fashion designer and beauty pageant titleholder who was crowned Miss Lebanon 1967 and represented her country at Miss World 1967 but unplaced she also compete at Miss Universe 1968 but unplaced.

== Biography ==
Sonia Fares was born on September 6, 1949, in Lebanon. She is a native to Beirut, Lebanon. Her father's name is Gerges Fares and her mother's name is Iman Attieh. She is also the mother of Rasha Chammas who is a photographer. She currently resides in Neuilly-sur-Seine.

== Education ==
Sonia Fares studied fine arts in Lebanon, and she then went on to study fashion in London.

== Career ==
Sonia Fares is currently a fashion designer. She was Miss Lebanon 1967. She was the owner of her boutique called "Sonia Fares." It was located in the Parisian golden triangle at the Rue Du Boccador. She is recorded to be a supporter of anything entailed to arts and culture.
