= Aziz Abdo =

Lebanese artist (born 1977)

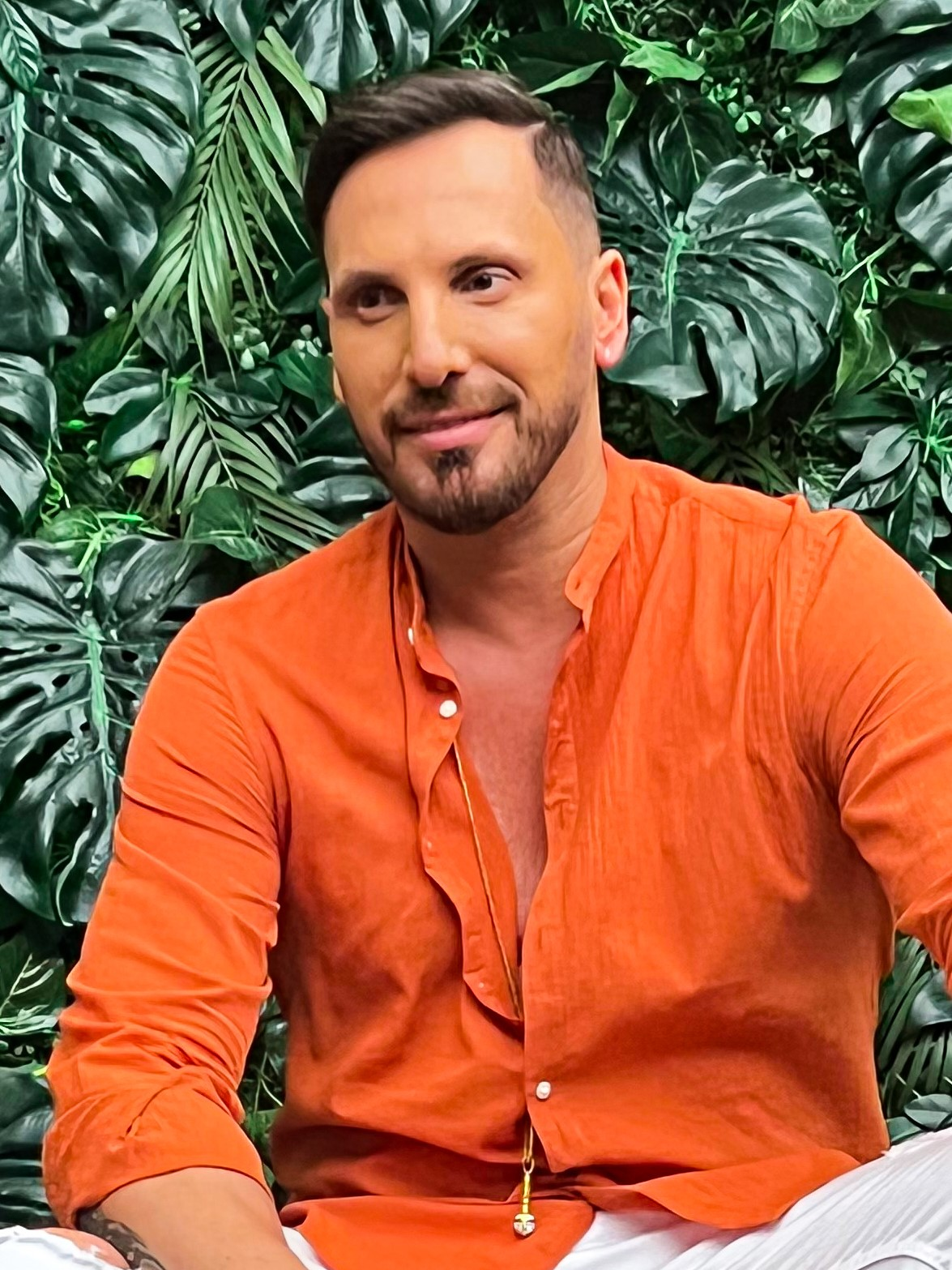

Background information
- Born: Aziz Abdo عزيز عبدو; 1977 (age 48–49); Beirut, Lebanon
- Genres: Arabic pop, Latin pop
- Occupations: Actor, model, singer-songwriter
- Instruments: Vocals
- Years active: 1997–present

Aziz Abdo (Arabic: عزيز عبدو, born 1977) is a Lebanese singer, actor, model, and beauty pageant titleholder. Abdo's family emigrated to Sweden where he debuted his modeling career. He moved back to Lebanon at the age of 20 where he participated in, and won the title of Mister Lebanon in 2001. He debuted his singing career in 2004, and released a number of albums and upbeat singles that appeal to the younger Arab audience.

== Early life ==
Aziz Abdo was born in Beirut to a Jordanian mother and a Lebanese father. He was fond of singing as a child and was a fan of Latin and American pop stars such as Ricky Martin, Michael Jackson, Enrique Iglesias, and Jennifer Lopez. The family emigrated to Sweden and settled in Motala to flee the Lebanese civil war. In Sweden, Abdo resumed his schooling and aspired to play professional football, but an accident prevented him from pursuing a sports career. At 16, he was spotted and recruited by Scandinavian Models agency. He participated in a number of fashion shows as a runway model, and was then signed by Stockholmsgruppen Models with whom he walked the runway for Giorgio Armani, Gucci, and Lagerfeld.

== Music career ==
When 20, Abdo visited Lebanon for the first time since leaving during the war; he grew attached to his home country and decided to move back. In Lebanon, he met and was recruited by Nathalie Fadlallah, the owner of the Lebanese Nathaly's Agency. In 2001, Abdo won the title of Mister Lebanon; the organizers of the pageant proposed that he performs a song with the then-reigning Mister Lebanon as a publicity gimmick to promote the pageant. Jiji Lamara, one of the leading Arab music producers, was present in the studio during the recording session. He gave Abdo the opportunity to launch a career in music. Lamara introduced Abdo to Lebanese music producer Tony Saba; their first collaboration was the hist song Jaw Jnoun.

Jaw Jnoun was released in 2006, along with the hit song Wallat El Nar, which gave its name to Abdo's debut album. Enty Tsharrafi followed in 2009. The work was controversial because the artist uncommonly mixed multiple Arab dialects, and due to the unconventional nudity in some of the album's music videos. Abdo released a number of singles afterwards, among which is "One Night", an upbeat English/Spanish song featuring Swedish rapper Moncho. In 2020, he collaborated with Timbaland and co-wrote the lyrics of Zayn Malik's "Too Much". His latest work is Howay Howay, released in 2022.

=== Style ===
Abdo's music style is a mixture of uptempo beats and romantic lyrics, described as "mixing Arabic poetism with fast-paced Latin-inspired music". He attributes his style to his childhood exposure to Latin and American pop. Latin music-infused Arab sings was a very popular mix in the Arab music scene in the early 2000s, Jaw Jnoun and Enty Tsharrafi became crowd favorites, and were especially successful among the younger audience. Abdo was notorious for his sensual, sexually charged controversial music videos that often featured female international models.

== Personal life ==
Aziz Abdo married his then-agent Nathalie Fadlallah. She remained Abdo's agent at that time, who continued his modelling career in Lebanon and abroad. The couple separated two years later due to their heavy schedules and differences.

Abdo is a resident of Dubai. He is an avid collector of luxury watches and apparel, and is a tennis and football aficionado.

== Discography ==
- Wallat El Nar (2006)
- Enty Tsharrafi (2009)
- Chou Ser Eli Bik
- Aalena Ya Albi - Single (2015)
- One Night (featuring Moncho) - Single (2021)
- Howay Howay - Single (2022)

== Filmography ==
- Sorry mom (2011)
- My Last Valentine in Beirut (2012)
