= Joelle Behlok =

Lebanese actor (born 1979)

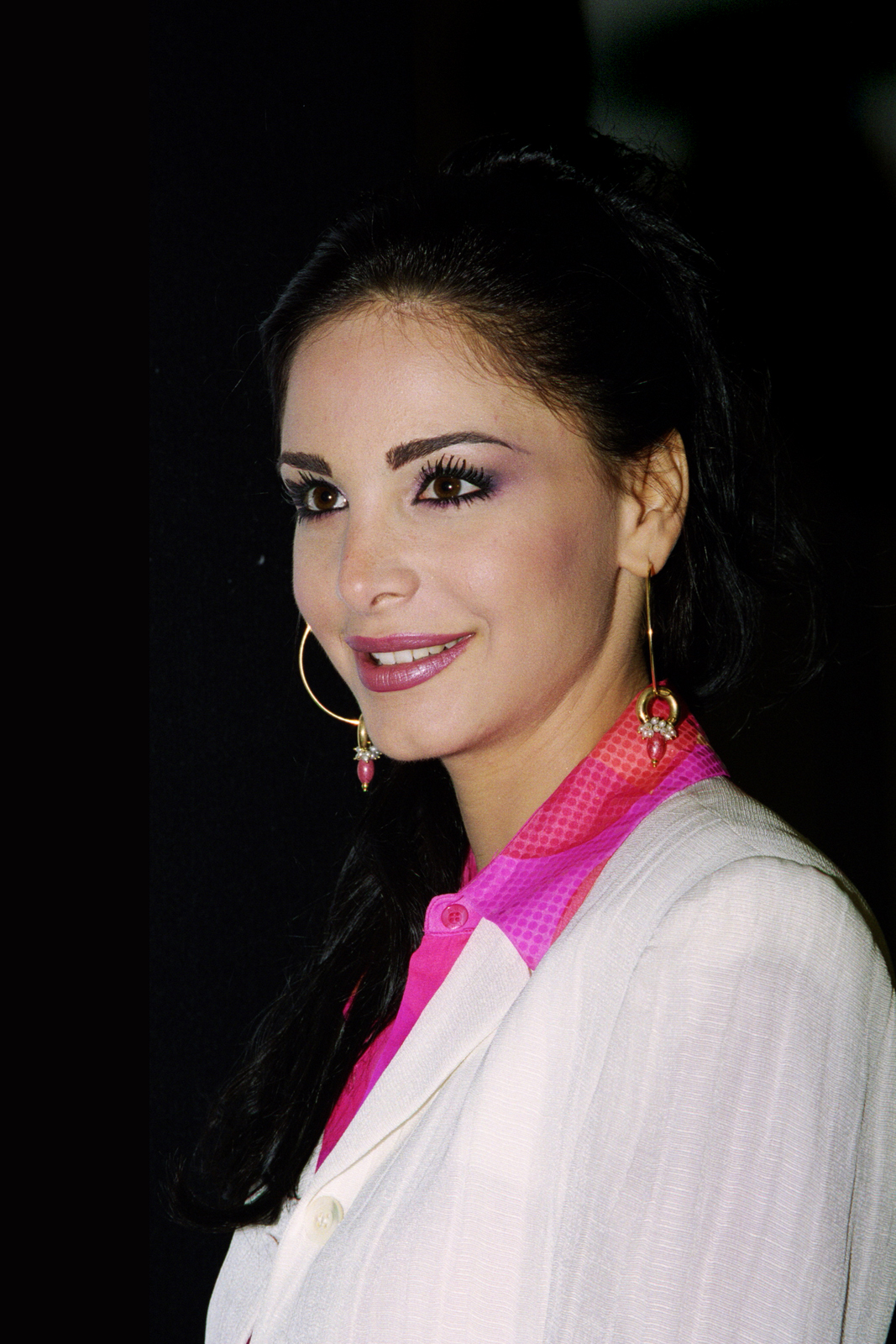
- Behlok in 2002
- Born: Joelle Georges Behlok; October 27, 1979 (age 47); Beirut, Lebanon
- Education: Collège des Frères Maristes Champville; Lebanese University
- Spouse: Adel Nader (m. 2007)
- Children: 3
- Beauty pageant titleholder
- Title: Miss Lebanon 1997
- Hair color: Brown
- Eye color: Brown
- Major competitions: Miss Lebanon 1997 (Winner); Miss World 1997 (Top 10)

Joelle Behlok or Joëlle Behlock (Arabic: جويل بحلق) (born 27 October 1979) is a Lebanese actress, tv host, fashion designer and beauty pageant titleholder who was crowned Miss Lebanon 1997. She finished in the Top 10 in Miss World 1997.

== Life ==
Behlok was educated at the Collège des Frères Maristes Champville in Awkar, then at the Lebanese University of Baabda.

After winning the Miss Lebanon Contest, she worked in advertising for gold jewelry and ornaments, then began an acting career and took the lead role in "The Last Cavalier" series in 2002. She later led the "Style with Joelle" fashion show on MBC TV channel.

In 2004, she filed a criminal case in Dubai against the editors of a news site for falsely claiming that she had had an affair. The court convicted the two editors in spite of the fact that they had issued a retraction but they were pardoned by the Crown Prince of Dubai.

== Family ==
She is married to Adel Nader and has three children.
