= Perla Helou =

Lebanese beauty queen (born 1995)

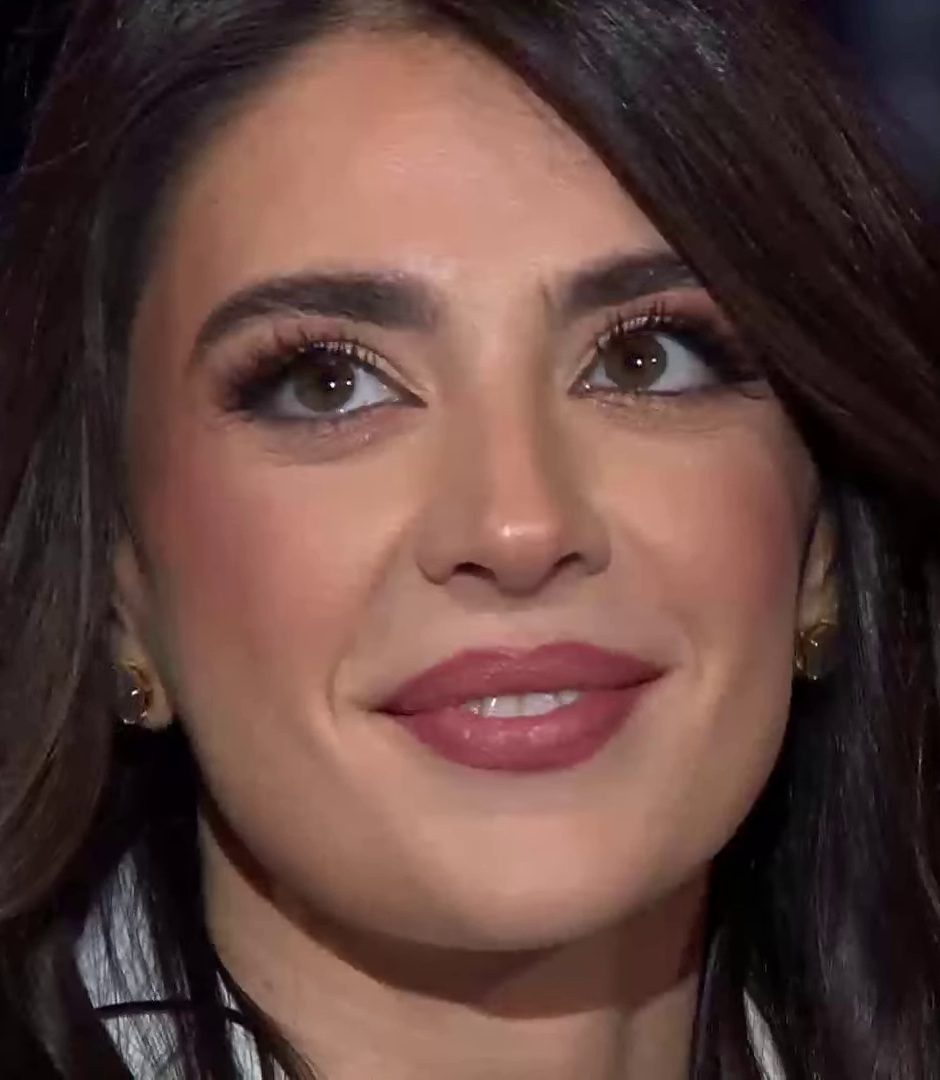
- Perla Helou on MTV Lebanon, 8 February 2020
- Born: Perla Helou; 10 July 1995 (age 31); Baabda, Lebanon
- Occupation: Beauty pageant titleholder
- Height: 1.75 m (5 ft 9 in)
- Beauty pageant titleholder
- Title: Miss Lebanon 2017
- Major competitions: Miss Lebanon 2017 (Winner); Miss World 2017 (Top 10 People's Choice; Top 5 multimedia Among top 40 overall)

Perla Helou (Arabic: بيرلا حلو)(born 10 July 1995) is a Lebanese model and beauty pageant titleholder who was crowned Miss Lebanon in 2017. She participated in Miss World 2017 on November 18 in Sanya, China where she placed 7th in People's Choice, 4th in Multimedia and in the Top 40 overall among the 118 contestants. She also won the head to head challenge of her group.

== Biography ==
Helou studied at Saint Joseph University in Beirut, where she graduated in June 2016, in business administration. As of 2017 she was pursuing her master's degree in management and marketing at École supérieure des affaires, also in Beirut.

=== Miss Lebanon 2017 ===
On September 24, 2017, Helou was crowned Miss Lebanon 2017 at Casino du Liban. The pageant was televised on LBCI and LDC. As Miss Lebanon, she competed at the Miss World 2017 pageant. In the final question shew answered the question "In your opinion, can civil society protest movements change the reality of Lebanon?" with "protesters should first agree on the objectives to be achieved in order to ensure the effectiveness of their movement".

=== Miss World 2017 ===
Helou placed 7th in people's choice, 4th in multimedia and in the top 40 overall among the 118 contestants. She also won the head to head challenge of her group. Helou was among the top 10 in many prediction leaderboards, such as Zardebelleza's leaderboard and others.

=== After pageantry ===
Helou supports empowering women.

== See also ==
- Miss Lebanon
- Miss World 2021

Awards and achievements
Preceded by Sandy Tabet	Miss Lebanon; 2017	Succeeded by Maya Reaidy
