= Nadine Wilson Njeim =

Lebanese beauty pageant contestant

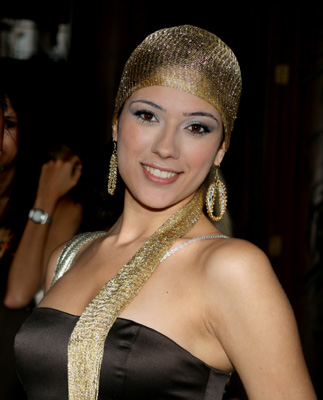
- Nadine Njeim in 2007
- Born: Nadine Wilson Njeim; February 8, 1988 (age 38); Maaser El Shouf, Lebanon
- Occupations: Actress, TV presenter, International Business Management
- Height: 1.81 m (5 ft 11 1/2 in)
- Beauty pageant titleholder
- Title: Miss Lebanon 2007
- Major competitions: Miss Lebanon 2007 (Winner); Miss Universe 2007 (Unplaced); Miss World 2007 (Unplaced)
- Website: nadine-njeim.com

Nadine Wilson Njeim (Arabic: نادين ويلسون نجيم) is a Lebanese actress and beauty pageant titleholder who was elected Miss Lebanon 2007. She represented her country in Miss World 2007 in China and Miss Universe 2007 in Mexico.

== Career ==
Njeim graduated with a double major in international business administration and political science in college.

She was crowned Miss Lebanon in 2007 at age 19. She represented Lebanon in Miss World 2007 and Miss Universe 2007.

After passing on her title as Miss Lebanon, Njeim pursued a career in acting, and cast in various lead roles for TV series such as Ghazlel Baneit (غزل البنات). Njeim voiced Lara Croft in the Arabic localization of the 2013 video game Tomb Raider and its 2018 sequel Shadow of the Tomb Raider.

She founded Designer 24, a designer clothing rental company, in 2014. As of 2018, she works as a managing partner at an IT company.

In 2024, she graduated from Harvard University with a master's degree in business administration.

In 2025, Njeim was appointed as an advisor to the First Lady of Lebanon.

== Personal life ==
She married Ramzy Dib in August 2016.
