= Sandy Tabet =

Lebanese beauty pageant titleholder

- Born: Sandy Tabet; 9 December 1995 (age 30); Beirut, Lebanon
- Height: 1.74 m (5 ft 9 in)
- Beauty pageant titleholder
- Title: Miss Lebanon 2016
- Hair color: Brown
- Eye color: Black
- Major competitions: Miss Lebanon 2016 (Winner); Miss World 2016 (Unplaced)

Sandy Tabet (Arabic: ساندي تابت; born 9 December 1995) is a Lebanese beauty pageant titleholder who was crowned Miss Lebanon 2016. She represented Lebanon at Miss World 2016.

== Pageantry and career ==
Tabet, originally from Bhamdoun, was born in Beirut, Lebanon. She was crowned Miss Lebanon on 22 October 2016. She represented her country at Miss World 2016, but she could not participate in Miss Universe because MTV Lebanon, which held the competition's license in the country, did not send a delegate that year.

She earned a bachelor's degree in Business Administration and a master's degree in Finance from Saint Joseph University. Following in her father's footsteps, she later pursued a career as a jewelry designer. She announced her marriage at Lake Como in May 2024.

Awards and achievements
Preceded by Valerie Abou Chacra	Miss Lebanon; 2016	Succeeded by Perla Helou
