= Rina Chibany =

Lebanese beauty pageant titleholder

- Born: 7 February 1991 (age 35); Zahlé, Lebanon
- Height: 1.78 m (5 ft 10 in)
- Beauty pageant titleholder
- Title: Miss Lebanon 2012
- Hair color: Brown
- Eye color: Hazel
- Major competitions: Miss Universe 2012 (Unplaced)

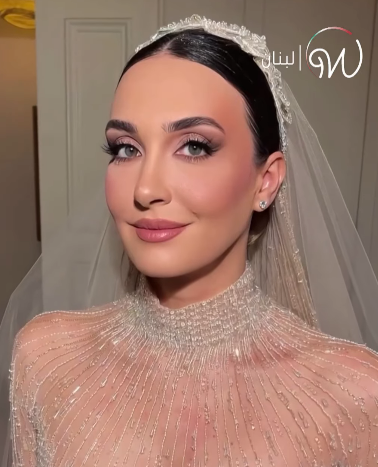

Rina Chibany (Arabic: رينا شيباني) (born 7 February 1991) is a Lebanese model and beauty pageant titleholder who was crowned Miss Lebanon 2012. She represented her country in the 2012 Miss Universe competition.

== Early life ==
Rina stands 178 cm tall and weighs 54 kg. Her vital statistics in inches are: 34-25-37.

Awards and achievements
Preceded by Yara Khoury	Miss Lebanon; 2012	Succeeded by Karen Ghrawi
