= Rouzaina Lazkani =

Syrian actress and politician

- روزينا اللاذقاني

Member of the People's Assembly
- Incumbent
- Assumed office 12 July 2026
- Appointed by: Ahmed al-Sharaa

Personal details
- Born: 17 April 1990 (age 36) Hama, Syria
- Party: Independent
- Education: Higher Institute of Dramatic Arts
- Occupation: Actress; politician

Rouzaina Amer Lazkani (Arabic: روزينا عامر اللاذقاني; born 17 April 1990) is a Syrian actress and politician.

== Career ==
Lazkani was born in Hama, Syria, in 1990, and later grew up in Damascus. She graduated from the Higher Institute of Dramatic Arts of Damascus with a degree in scenography and has acted in multiple Arabic-language projects, including Al Hayba.

She has served as a member of the People's Assembly since 1 July 2026 following her appointment by president Ahmed al-Sharaa. Her appointment was part of al-Sharaa's efforts to broaden representation in the People's Assembly by including women and figures from diverse backgrounds. Analysts said Lazkani provided the parliament with a prominent cultural figure and public presence. Lazkani said she initially thought her appointment was a "prank" and hoped to represent artists and her generation, describing the role as a responsibility despite her limited political experience.
