= Gabrielle Bou Rached =

Lebanese model and actress

- Born: Gabrielle Bou Rached; December 13, 1985 (age 40); Jezzine, Lebanon
- Beauty pageant titleholder
- Title: Miss Lebanon 2005
- Major competitions: Miss Lebanon 2005 (Winner); Miss Universe 2006 (Unplaced)

Gabrielle Bou Rached (Arabic: غابريال بو راشد; b. 13 December 1985 in Jezzine) is a Lebanese model, actress, motorcyclist and beauty pageant titleholder. In 2005 she was crowned Miss Lebanon 2005. After 2015, she shifted her focus on motorcycling and was appointed in 2018 as Director of HOG Abu Dhabi Chapter. In 2021, she was elected as President of HOG GCC. She is the first female Arab biker to achieve King Of The Road/ Bun Burner Gold motorcycle challenge. She featured on the cover of the Harley-Davidson Owners Group Magazine- Issue 1- 2019 (Europe and Asia edition)

== Early life and education ==
Gabrielle Bou Rached (Hometown Jezzine, Lebanon) was born in Beirut in a Maronite Christian family. Her mother is from Bteghrine. She modeled during her teenage years, participating in music videos for Arab singers, in television commercials, and in fashion shows. She also had a role (2004) in the Lebanese film Falafel, which was released in 2006.

Gabrielle Bou Rached studied translation, earning a Master's Degree in Interpretation; she speaks four languages, Arabic, English, French, and Spanish. On 11 October 2009 she married Sami Assaf in a Christian ceremony in Bkerke, Lebanon. They honeymooned in Paris and Madrid. They currently reside in Abu Dhabi, where both are employed by the UAE government.

== Modeling ==
December 2005, Gabrielle wins Miss Lebanon 2005 after 5 rounds of eliminations.

February 2004, Gabrielle was crowned as Miss ETIB at The School of Translation and Interpretation in USJ University Beirut.
May 2005, Gabrielle was crowned Miss Campus of USJ University Beirut.
Summer 2005, Gabrielle represented Lebanon in the Miss Asia Pageant where she won the Miss Intellect Award and placed 2nd in the Best National Costume Award. She also made the top 8 in the pageant, the only Miss Lebanon to do so.
May 2006, Gabrielle participated in the Miss Universe 2006 pageant in Los Angeles, California, the first Miss Asia contestant to compete at Miss Lebanon and win.

== Acting ==
- Falafel (Movie, 2005)
- Wouroud Moumazzaka (Drama series, 2007)
- Nar That Al Jaleed (Drama series, 2008)
