= Rosarita Tawil =

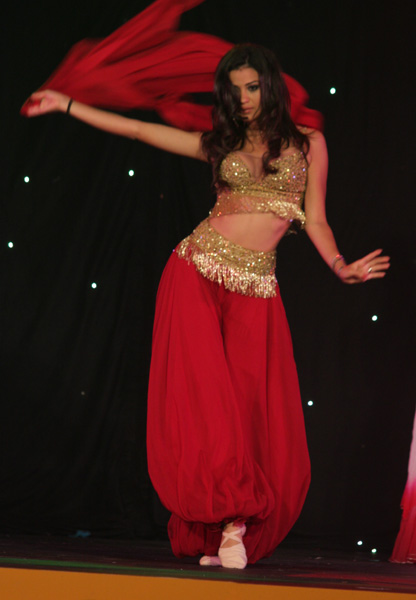
- Born: July 23, 1988 (age 38); Beirut, Lebanon
- Occupations: Model; Humanitarian; TV Host
- Height: 1.77 m (5 ft 10 in)
- Beauty pageant titleholder
- Title: Miss Lebanon 2008
- Years active: 2008–present
- Hair color: Dark Brown
- Eye color: Dark Brown

Rosarita Tawil (Arabic: روزاريتا طويل) is a Lebanese humanitarian, model, and beauty pageant titleholder who was crowned Miss Lebanon 2008.

== Early life ==
Tawil was born on July 23, 1988 in Beirut, Lebanon having graduated from both College Notre-Dame de Jamhour and the American University of Beirut having studied Business Administration American University of Beirut (AUB).

== Career ==
Her big break came in 2008 where she was crowned Miss Lebanon 2008. She represented Lebanon in South Africa Johannesburg in the Miss World 2008 Pageant, where she placed in the top 10 finalists of The Miss World Beach Beauty contest.

In 2013 she finished runner-up in the inaugural season of Dancing with the Stars Middle East Edition.

Since then Tawil has appeared on the covers and in the editorials of fashion magazines such as Vogue, Harper's Bazaar, ELLE, Grazia, Cosmopolitan, and Sayidaty.

Tawil has worked with global and regional brands from potshot to walking the catwalk which include Pepsi, Miss Sixty, Versace, Chopard, Elie Saab, Georges Hobeika, and Rotana.

=== Acting and hosting ===
In 2016, Tawil began her acting debut co-hosting the daily show BLIVE on LBC Sat and Rotana, which covered fashion, beauty, nutrition, styling, sports, psychology, technology, social media, arts and medical issues with local and regional guests.

In 2018/2019, Tawil produced a humanitarian mini web series "We are all Beauty Queens" where she interviewed marginalised women as part of a women's empowerment campaign, shedding light on their stories and helping them regain confidence by "glamming them up" improving their self confidence and showing them that they are beautiful, that we are all beauty queens.

=== Philanthropy ===
Tawil was PR Ambassador for the RJLiban NGO, helping Lebanese immigrants around the world reconnect with Lebanon. Her main focus was Latin America.
