= Baissour =

Baissour may refer to several places in Lebanon:

- Baissour, Aley
- Baissour, Jezzine
