= Said Serhan =

Lebanese actor, writer and TV presenter (born 1979)

- Born: 15 December 1979 (age 46); Lebanon
- Occupation: Actor

Said Serhan (Arabic; سعيد سرحان) is a Lebanese actor, writer and TV presenter. He has performed in films, TV series and plays in Lebanon and abroad, and was the presenter of Al-Darb TV Show on the Al Jazeera children's channel.

== Education ==
At an early age, he showed a love for performing arts and took part in several plays at the age of 9. After graduating from high school with a scientific diploma in 1998, he applied to the Faculty of Arts in the Lebanese University's Fine Arts Institute where he studied theater under the tutelage of renowned actors and directors such as Aida Sabra and Fayeq Homaissi. He graduated with an Honors Degree in 2002.

== Career ==
In 2005 he shot to fame in the hit TV show "Al-Darb" on Al Jazeera children's channel, alongside Greta El Rayess, with whom he co-presented more than 1000 episodes.

Later on, he acted in several plays but it wasn't until MAAARCH that he got his first big break with prominent director and writer Issam Bou Khaled, with whom he worked again in 2009 in the play Banafsaj, where he played the role of a human who had been dehumanized and treated as a dog, till he had become an animal. His co-star, Bernadette Hodeib also worked him in "Black Box" (2010).

In cinema, he played in Falafel by director Michel Kammoun. On set, he met director Talal Khoury and since then had shot several films together.

In 2016, Tombe Du Ciel, a film he co-starred in with Rodrigue Sleiman, and was directed by Wissam Charaf, premiered at the Festival de Cannes, in the Prestigious Acid Selection.
