= Samer Al Barkawi =

Syrian filmmaker

Samer Al Barkawi سامر البرقاوي
- Born: Samer Al Barkawi; September 5, 1972 (age 53); Syria
- Education: University of Damascus
- Occupations: Director, producer
- Years active: 2008–present

Samer Al Barkawi (born 5 September 1973), is a Syrian director. He is best known as the director of popular television serials and films Al Hayba, Djemai Family, Sultan Achour and 10 Bouzid Days.

== Personal life ==
He was born on 5 September 1973 in Syria. He graduated with a degree in business management from the University of Damascus in 1994.

== Career ==
In 2010, he directed his maiden film Baed Al Sokoot. Then he made the television serial Khawatim in 2012. In 2013, he directed the serial Loabat El Mawt (Game of Death) which had its official television screening on 10 July 2013 in Egypt. Later, it was released in Lebanon. After the success of the series, he made the and A Cry of a Soul: Sarkhet Roh in 2013.

He also made several critical acclaimed short films such as Nur and The Poster in 2003, Yousry Nasrallah in 2005, and Kalam Harim: Women's Talk in 2006. In 2017, he made Syrian-Lebanese drama television series Al Hayba. The serial received large popularity with some criticism with representations of women and domestic violence. The series was spanned for four seasons. The series first aired on Middle East Broadcasting Center (MBC) to the Arab world on 27 May 2017. and continued up to date.

== Filmography ==
Year	Film	Role	Genre	Ref.
2010	Baed Al Sokoot	Director	TV movie	
2013	Loabat Al Moot (Game of Death)	Director	TV series	
2013	A Cry of a Soul: Sarkhet Roh	Director	TV series	
2014	What If: Aka Laow	Director	TV series	
2015	Cello	Director	TV series	
2016	Nos Youm	Director	TV series	
2017	Al Hayba	Director	TV series	
2017	Shababeek: Windows	Director	TV series	
2018	Al Hayba the Comeback	Director	TV series	
2018	Nassif Zeytoun: Azmit si'a	Director	Video short	
2019	Al Hayba the Harvest	Director	TV series	
2020	Al Hayba the Payback	Director	TV series	
2021	Al Hayba Jabal	Director	TV series	
