= Yasmina Zaytoun =

Lebanese TV presenter, and beauty pageant titleholder (born 2002)

- ياسمينة زيتون
- Born: Yasmina Ismail Zaytoun; 26 October 2002 (age 23); Tyre, Lebanon
- Education: Notre Dame University-Louaize
- Height: 1.71 m (5 ft 7 in)
- Beauty pageant titleholder
- Title: Miss Lebanon 2022; Miss World Asia 2023
- Hair color: Brown
- Eye color: Black
- Major competitions: Miss Lebanon 2022; (Winner); Miss Universe 2022; (Unplaced); Miss World 2023; (Runner-Up; Miss World Asia)

Yasmina Ismail Zaytoun (Arabic: ياسمينة إسماعيل زيتون; born 26 October 2002) is a Lebanese journalist, television presenter, and beauty pageant titleholder who was crowned Miss Lebanon 2022, and later finished as the Runner-Up of the Miss World 2023 international pageant held in Mumbai, Maharashtra, India.

She also previously competed at the Miss Universe 2022 competition that took place in New Orleans, Louisiana, United States.

== Early life and education ==
Zaytoun is from Kfarchouba, South Lebanon. She entered Notre Dame University-Louaize in Zouk Mosbeh to pursue a bachelor's degree in journalism. She achieved a TV presenter certification from the Al Jazeera Media Institute. In April 2021, she began hosting an educational show on Instagram called With Yasmina Show.

== Pageantry ==
=== Miss Lebanon 2022 ===
Zaytoun represented the Hasbaya District at the Miss Lebanon 2022 competition, held at the Forum de Beyrouth in Beirut on 24 July 2022, where she competed against 16 other candidates for the title. At the conclusion of the event, Zaytoun was crowned Miss Lebanon 2022 by the outgoing titleholder Maya Reaidy, becoming the first titleholder to be crowned following the pageant’s three-year hiatus from 2019 to 2021.

During a virtual address by Rima Fakih, the national director of Miss Universe Lebanon, it was announced that the winner of the pageant would represent Lebanon at the Miss Universe 2022 and Miss World 2023 competitions.

=== Miss Universe 2022 ===
Zaytoun represented Lebanon at the Miss Universe 2022 competition, held on 14 January 2023 in New Orleans, Louisiana, where she was unplaced. The title was won by R'Bonney Gabriel of the United States.

=== Miss World 2023 ===
After her Miss Universe tenure, Zaytoun later represented Lebanon at the Miss World 2023 pageant in India, which was initially scheduled to be held on 16 December 2023 but was subsequently postponed to 9 March 2024 due to the 2024 Indian general election. During the fast-track events, Zaytoun placed in the Top 20 of the Top Model Challenge and was initially among the Top 25 delegates in the Head-to-Head Challenge before being announced as one of the five winners, alongside Lesego Chombo of Botswana, Jessica Gagen of England, Ada Eme of Nigeria, and Nokutenda Marumbwa of Zimbabwe.

The coronation night of the pageant was held at the Jio World Convention Centre in Mumbai, where she was declared the runner-up to Krystyna Pyszková of the Czech Republic at the conclusion of the event. Zaytoun's runner-up finish is the highest placement achieved by a Lebanese representative at the Miss World pageant. She also received the Miss World Asia 2023 title as the highest-placing contestant among the Asian delegates and became the fourth woman from the Middle East to earn the continental title, following Yi'fat Schechter in 1983, Iris Louk in 1984, and Maja Wechtenhaim in 1985.

Awards and achievements
Preceded by (United States) Shree Saini	Miss World 1st Runner-Up; 2023	Succeeded by (Ethiopia) Hasset Dereje
Preceded by (Indonesia) Pricilia Carla Yules	Miss World Asia & Oceania; 2023	Succeeded by (Philippines) Krishnah Gravidez
Preceded by Maya Reaidy	Miss Lebanon; 2022	Succeeded by Nada Koussa
Preceded by Maya Reaidy	Miss Universe Lebanon; 2022	Succeeded by Maya Aboul Hosn
Preceded by Mira Al-Toufaily	Miss World Lebanon; 2023	Succeeded by Incumbent
