= Valerie Abou Chacra =

Lebanese actress and beauty pageant titleholder

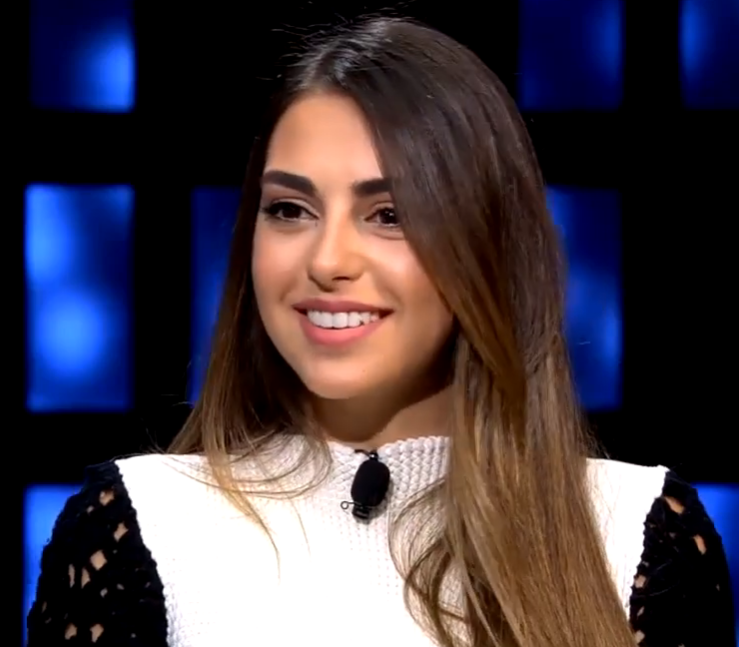
- Abou Chakra in 2019
- Born: Valerie Abou Chacra; 15 January 1992 (age 34); Beirut, Lebanon
- Height: 1.73 m (5 ft 8 in)
- Beauty pageant titleholder
- Title: Miss Lebanon 2015
- Hair color: Brown
- Eye color: Black
- Major competitions: Miss Lebanon 2015 (Winner); Miss World 2015 (Top 5)

Valerie Abou Chacra (Arabic: فاليري أبو شقرا; born 15 January 1992) is a Lebanese actress and beauty pageant titleholder who was crowned Miss Lebanon 2015. She represented Lebanon at the Miss World 2015 competition. She has also starred in widely watched Arabic TV series such as 'Ma Fiyi'.

== Education ==
Abou Chacra studied Communication Arts: Radio and TV films at the Lebanese American University.

== Pageantry ==
Valerie Abou Chacra was crowned Miss Lebanon on 12 October 2015. She represented Lebanon at the Miss World 2015 pageant and was selected among the Top 5 finalists. She was the first woman from Lebanon to place that high in Miss World's history while Mireia Lalaguna from Spain, was also the first Spanish woman to win the title.

== Acting ==
Abou Chacra started acting in a TV series, A'shra Abid Zghar (Ten Little Slaves), in 2014. She later participated in Dancing with the Stars: Raqs el Noujoum in 2016, and finished third. In 2017, she hosted Project Runway.

Also, she participated in Celebrity Duets Arab World season 3 and finished third. Later on, she acted in Al Hayba Season 2 in 2018, Ma Fiyi in 2019.

== Personal life ==
In 2019, she became engaged to Lebanese businessman Ziad Ammar. The couple married on 1 August 2020. In July 2021, Abou Chacra gave birth to twin girls. In January 2024, she had her third child, a boy.

== Filmography ==
Year	Title	Role	Broadcaster	Notes
2014	Ten Little Slaves	Sophie	MTV Lebanon	original title: A'shra Abid Zghar
2018	Al Hayba (The Return)	Mariam	MTV Lebanon	original title: Al Hayba (Al Awda)
2019	Love Me Not	Yasma	MTV Lebanon	original title: Ma Fiyi
2021	Not Guilty	Zaman Bitar	Shahid	original title: La Hukm Alayh
2022	From…To	Mai	Shahid	original title: Min…Ela

Awards and achievements
Preceded by Saly Greige	Miss Lebanon; 2015	Succeeded by Sandy Tabet
