= Dima Kandalaft =

Syrian actress and singer (born 1979)

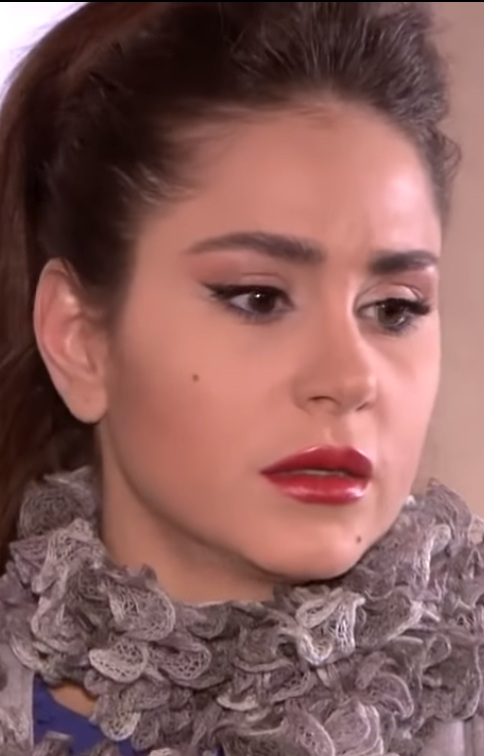
- An screenshot of Sarkhat Rouh Syrian TV series, E01 P02, shows Dima Kandalaft as Luma
- Born: 3 January 1979 (age 47); Damascus, Syria
- Education: Damascus University; Higher Institute for Dramatic Arts
- Occupations: Actress, singer
- Years active: 2001–present
- Spouse: Humam Al Jazaeri (m. 2015)

Dima Kandalaft (Arabic: ديمة قندلفت; born 3 January 1979 in Damascus) is a Syrian actress and singer.

== Biography ==
Kandalaft was born in Damascus to a doctor Syrian Christian father and a Lebanese mother from Marjayoun.

She graduated with a degree of economics from Damascus University. She pursued an acting career and studied at the Higher Institute for Dramatic Arts. One of her most prominent roles was a role in Bab al-Hara.

On 30 May 2015, Kandalaft married Humam Al Jazaeri, a former Minister of Economy and Foreign Trade.
