= Miss International 2002 =

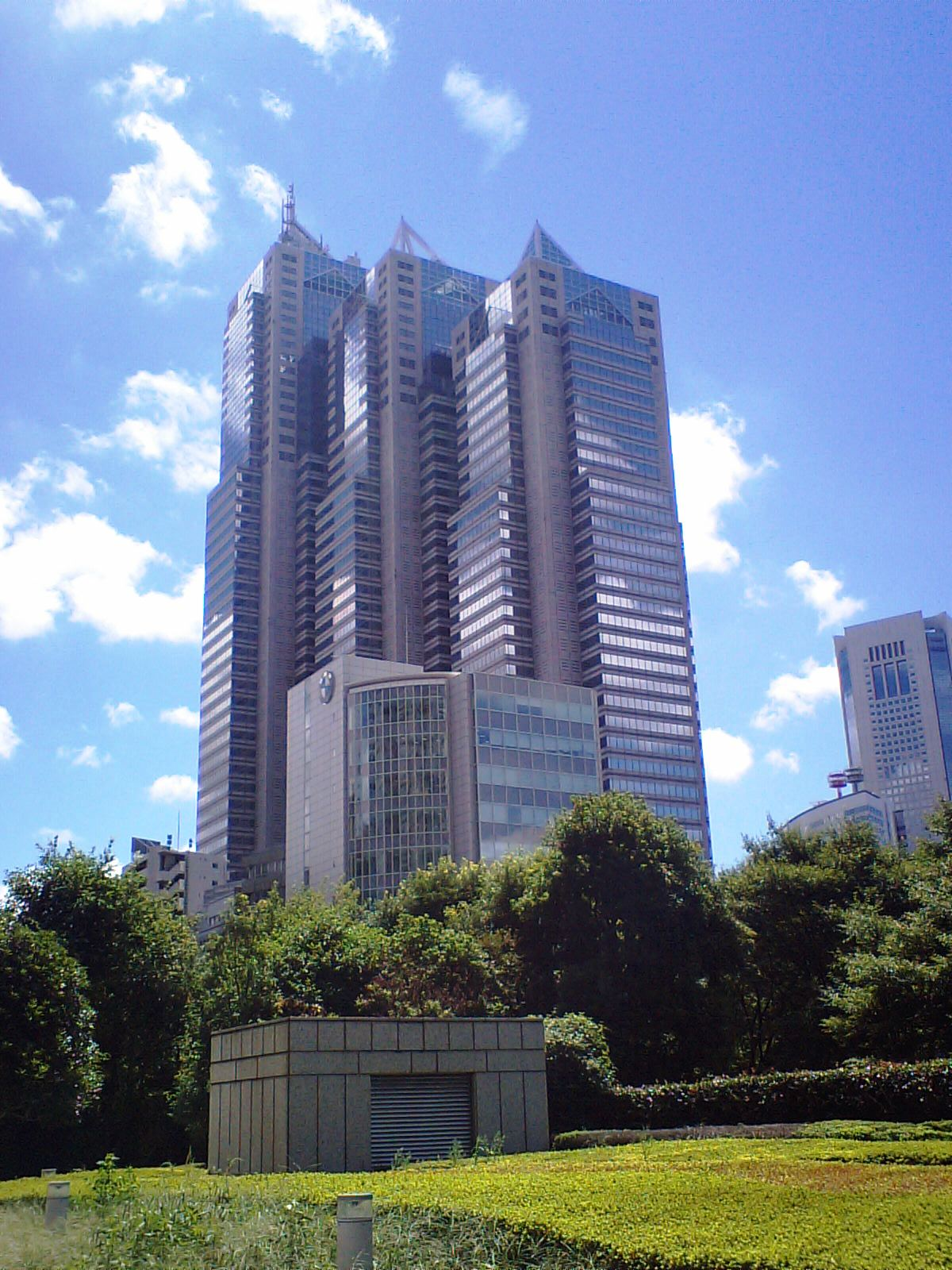
- Date: September 30, 2002
- Presenters: Masumi Okada
- Venue: Century Hyatt, Tokyo, Japan
- Broadcaster: TV Tokyo
- Entrants: 47
- Placements: 12
- Debuts: China
- Withdrawals: Argentina; Chile; Croatia; Iceland; Latvia; Mongolia; Netherlands; Norway; Palau; San Marino; Ukraine
- Returns: Ecuador; Lebanon; Moldova; Senegal
- Winner: Christina Sawaya; Lebanon

Miss International 2002, the 42nd Miss International pageant, was held on 30 September 2002 in Tokyo, Japan at the Century Hyatt. Małgorzata Rożniecka of Poland crowned her successor Christina Sawaya of Lebanon at the end of the event.

This edition also saw the crowning of the first woman of Middle Eastern descent to win Miss International, Christina Sawaya representing Lebanon.

== Results ==
=== Placements ===
| Placement | Contestant |
|---|---|
| Miss International 2002 | Lebanon – Christina Sawaya |
| 1st Runner-up | France – Emmanuelle Jagodsinski |
| 2nd Runner-up | Japan – Hana Urushima |
| Top 12 | Czech Republic – Lenka Taussigová; Dominican Republic – Jeimi Hernández; Nicaragua – Marianela Lacayo; Poland – Monika Angermann; Senegal – Mame Diarra Mballo; South Korea – Gi Yoon-joo; Spain – Laura Espinosa; Thailand – Piyanuch Khamboon; Turkey – Nihan Akkus |

== Contestants ==
- Aruba – Jerianne Tiel
- Bolivia – Carla Ameller
- Brazil – Milena Ricarda de Lima Lira
- Canada – Alicia Victoria Altares
- China – Amy Yan Wei
- Colombia – Consuelo Guzman Parra
- Curacao – Luz Thonysha De Souza
- Cyprus – Nichole Stylianou
- Czech Republic – Lenka Taussigova
- Dominican Republic – Jeimi Vanessa Hernández Franjul
- Ecuador – Isabel Cristina Ontaneda Pinto
- Finland – Katariina Kulve
- France – Emmanuelle Jagodsinski
- Germany – Eva Dedecke
- Greece – Stella Yiaboura
- Guatemala – Evelyn Arreaga
- Hawaii – Chun Hui Chen
- Hong Kong – Cathy Wu Kar-Wai
- India – Gauahar Khan
- Israel – Shelly Dina'i
- Japan – Hana Urushima
- Lebanon – Christina Sawaya
- Macedonia – Marta Pancevska
- Malaysia – Krystal Pang Chia Boon
- Malta – Alison Abela
- Mexico – Velia Rueda Galindo
- Moldova – Mariana Moraru †
- Nicaragua – Marianela Lacayo
- Northern Mariana Islands – Christine Juwelle Cunanan
- Panama – Cristina Herrera
- Philippines – Kristine Alzar
- Poland – Monika Angermann
- Puerto Rico – Mariela Lugo Marín
- Russia – Kseniya Efimtseva
- Senegal – Mame Diarra Mballo
- Singapore – Marie Wong Yan Yi
- Slovakia – Zuzana Gunisova
- South Korea – Gi Yoon-joo
- Spain – Laura Espinosa Huertas
- Sweden – Emelie Lundquist
- Thailand – Piyanuch Khamboon
- Tunisia – Nihad El-Abdi
- Turkey – Nihan Akkus
- United Kingdom – Juliet-Jane Horne
- United States – Mary Elizabeth Jones
- Venezuela – Cynthia Cristina Lander Zamora
- Yugoslavia – Aleksandra Kokotovic

== Notes ==
=== Withdrawals ===
- Pakistan – Neelam Voorani (forced by her Islamic government to withdraw from the pageant 3 days before the finals)
