= Nada Koussa =

Lebanese beauty pageant titleholder

- ندى كوسا
- Born: April 1998 (age 28); Rahbeh, Lebanon
- Education: Notre Dame University–Louaize; University of Balamand
- Beauty pageant titleholder
- Title: Miss Lebanon 2024
- Hair color: Brown
- Eye color: Green
- Major competitions: Miss Lebanon 2024; (Winner); Miss Universe 2024; (Unplaced); Miss World 2025; (Top 20)

Nada Koussa (Arabic: ندى كوسا; born April 1998) is a Lebanese beauty pageant titleholder who won Miss Lebanon 2024.

Koussa represented Lebanon at Miss Universe 2024.

== Biography ==
Koussa is from Rahbeh, Akkar District and has a bachelor's degree in psychology from Notre Dame University–Louaize, and a master's degree in clinical psychology from the University of Balamand.

In 2018, Koussa appeared in a Nancy Ajram music video Hassa Beek.

Awards and achievements
Preceded by Yasmina Zaytoun	Miss Lebanon; 2024	Incumbent
