= Guy Manoukian =

Lebanese musician (born 1976)

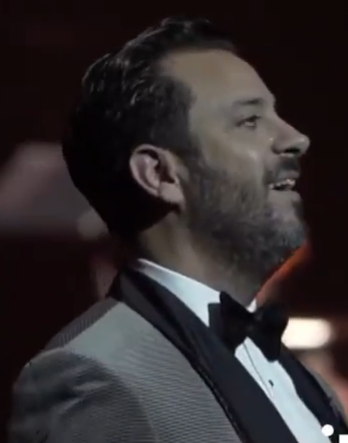

Guy Manoukian (Arabic: غي مانوكيان, Western Armenian Կի Մանուկեան, Armenian: Գի Մանուկյան) (born in Beirut, Lebanon in 1976) is a Lebanese-Armenian musician, composer, and pianist. He is a university graduate in law in Lebanon. He was also a basketball player in the Lebanese Basketball League for Homenetmen Beirut basketball club, and after retirement, ran the club's basketball programme as a player.

== Biography ==
Guy Manoukian began playing piano at the age of four years old, after which he started studying classical music. He first appeared on television at the age of five years old and was invited to play at The Lebanese Presidential Palace by the age of six. Manoukian began composing music at the age of seven years and won his first competition back then. However, he started performing professional concerts in 1994.

Guy Manoukian is married to Sarah Manoukian and has two sons and a daughter (Gio, Luca, and Cara).

== Albums ==
- 2001: REG project
- 2003: Sarab
- 2005: Live in Cairo
- 2009: Assouman
- 2010: Orchid
- 2014: Nomad

His music also appeared in collections like "The REG Project" (2001), "Arabia Night" (2006), Bellylicious (2006), "Experience Egypt" (2006), "Ultimate Discotheque Orientale" (2007), and "Fashion TV Arabia" (2007)

== Manoukian Music Consultancy MMC ==
Guy Manoukian established Manoukian Music Consultancy, specializing in producing music and sound design for films, artists, concept albums, and advertisements.

== Awards ==
- Best Dance Album at the Armenian Music Awards in Los Angeles
- Best Arabic Tune of the Year for the music of Harem (Lebanon 2002)
- Best Dance Album at the Arabian Music Awards (Dubai 2003)
