= Nadine Nassib Njeim =

Lebanese actress and beauty queen

- نادين نسيب نجيم
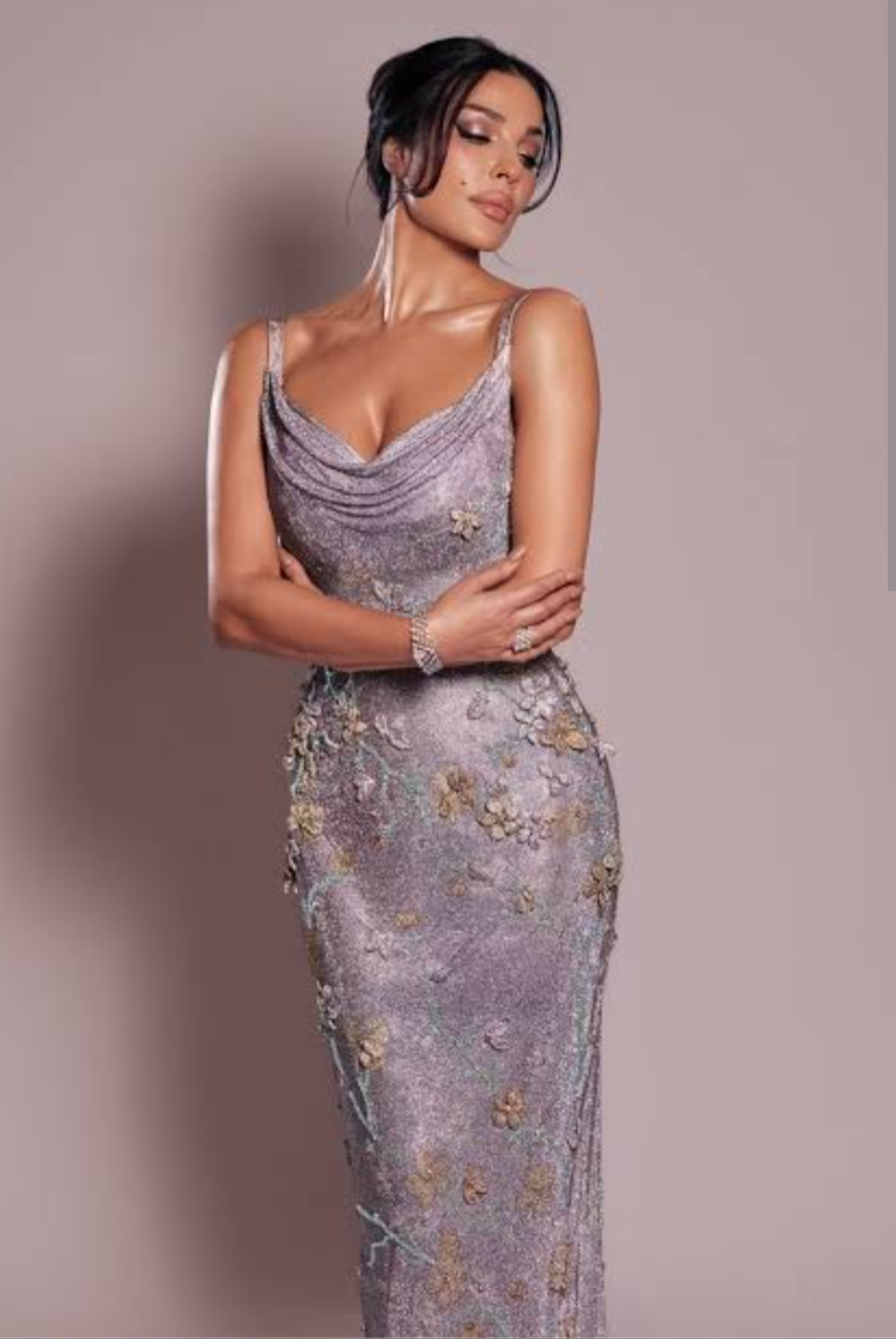
- Njeim in 2019
- Born: February 7, 1984 (age 42); Beirut, Lebanon
- Height: 5 ft 9 in (175 cm)
- Spouse: Hady Asmar (m. 2012; div. 2019)
- Children: 2
- Beauty pageant titleholder
- Title: Miss Lebanon 2004
- Hair color: Black
- Eye color: Brown
- Major competitions: Miss Lebanon 2004 (Winner); Miss World 2004 (unplaced); Miss Universe 2005 (unplaced)

Nadine Nassib Njeim (ar: نادين نسيب نجيم) (born 7 February 1984) is a Lebanese-Tunisian actress and beauty pageant titleholder who won Miss Lebanon 2004. She represented Lebanon at Miss Universe 2005 in Thailand.

== Background ==
Njeim was born in Beirut to a Lebanese Maronite Christian father, Nassib Njeim, originally from Duris, and a Tunisian Muslim mother. In 2011 she married Hady Asmar, and together they have two children. They divorced in September 2019.

== Acting ==
Njeim has pursued a career in acting, and has been cast in multiple Arabic TV series, including Law, Cello, Samra, Eshq El Nesaa, Nos Yawm, Al Hayba, Tareeq, Khamse w Noss and 2020. She was the first Arab actress to be nominated for Best Actress at the Seoul International Film Festival for her performance in Samra.

Njeim left the cast of Al Hayba after only one season, claiming that her role as a woman on the show conformed to gender stereotypes and that she wanted her character to be more physically active.

== Social views and controversy ==
In a 2012 interview on Future TV, Njeim expressed her views on premarital sex and gender equality. She said: "I want women to stay women. If they equate me with a man, I’d feel like a man. I don’t want to. I want to stay a woman." In response to the backlash she received in 2016 when a clip of the interview resurfaced, Njeim stated that she believed the content of the resurfaced clip had been purposely edited to discredit her. She said she supported women's rights and that her message promoted gender equality.
