= Rahbeh =

Rahbeh رحبة
- Location within Lebanon
- Coordinates: 34°30′14″N 36°08′48″E
- Country: Lebanon
- Governorate: Akkar
- District: Akkar

Area
  - Total: 11.50 km^{2} (4.44 sq mi)
- Elevation: 560 m (1,840 ft)

Population
  - Total: 8,000 (approx.)
  - Density: 700/km^{2} (1,800/sq mi)
- Time zone: UTC+2 (EET)
  - Summer (DST): UTC+3 (EEST)
- Dialing code: +961

Rahbeh (Arabic: رحبة), also spelled Rahbe or Rahbé, is a city located in Akkar Governorate, Lebanon. A majority of its inhabitants are Greek Orthodox Christians. In 2009, there were 6,133 eligible voters in Rahbeh.

== History ==
In 1838, Eli Smith noted the village, whose inhabitants were Orthodox Christians, located south of esh-Sheikh Mohammed.

Rahbeh is the second biggest village in North Lebanon, with a majority Christian Orthodox population, along with other Christian sectors and a minority Muslim population. It is renowned for having 365 springs and is famous for producing Lebanon's best Shanklish. Rahbeh has nurtured numerous prominent medical doctors, research scientists, and engineers in the semiconductor and other highly-tech industries. Rahbeh's people are well-known for their hospitality to visitors from all over the world, as many of its residents have migrated to various countries, including North and South American, African, and Arab states of the Persian Gulf. The local and migrated Rahbeh people have achieved tremendous success and made significant contributions to healthcare, science, technology, and the town's economy and the wellbeing of its residents.

== Bibliography ==
- Robinson, E.; Smith, E. (1841). Biblical Researches in Palestine, Mount Sinai and Arabia Petraea: A Journal of Travels in the year 1838. Vol. 3. Boston: Crocker & Brewster.
