= Maamariyeh =

Maamariyeh المعمرية
- Municipality
- Location in Lebanon
- Coordinates: 33°29′28″N 35°22′11″E
- Country: Lebanon
- Governorate: South Governorate
- District: Sidon District
- Time zone: UTC+2 (EET)
  - Summer (DST): UTC+3 (EEST)

Maamariyeh (Arabic: المعمرية) is a municipality in the Sidon District of the South Governorate in Lebanon.

== History ==
In 1875 Victor Guérin travelled from Aaqtanit, and noted: "A beautiful valley, planted with fig and olive trees, separates this village from another which faces it to the south, and of the same importance. It is called Ma'amrieh. Its population is likewise Maronite. The church, under the name of Sainte-Marie, dates back about fifteen years."

== Demographics ==
In 2014, Christians made up 98.58% of registered voters in Maamariyeh. 86.92% of the voters were Maronite Catholics.

== Bibliography ==
- Guérin, V. (1880). Description Géographique Historique et Archéologique de la Palestine (in French). Vol. 3: Galilee, pt. 2. Paris: L'Imprimerie Nationale.
