= Nicolas Jebran =

Lebanese fashion designer

- نيكولا جبران
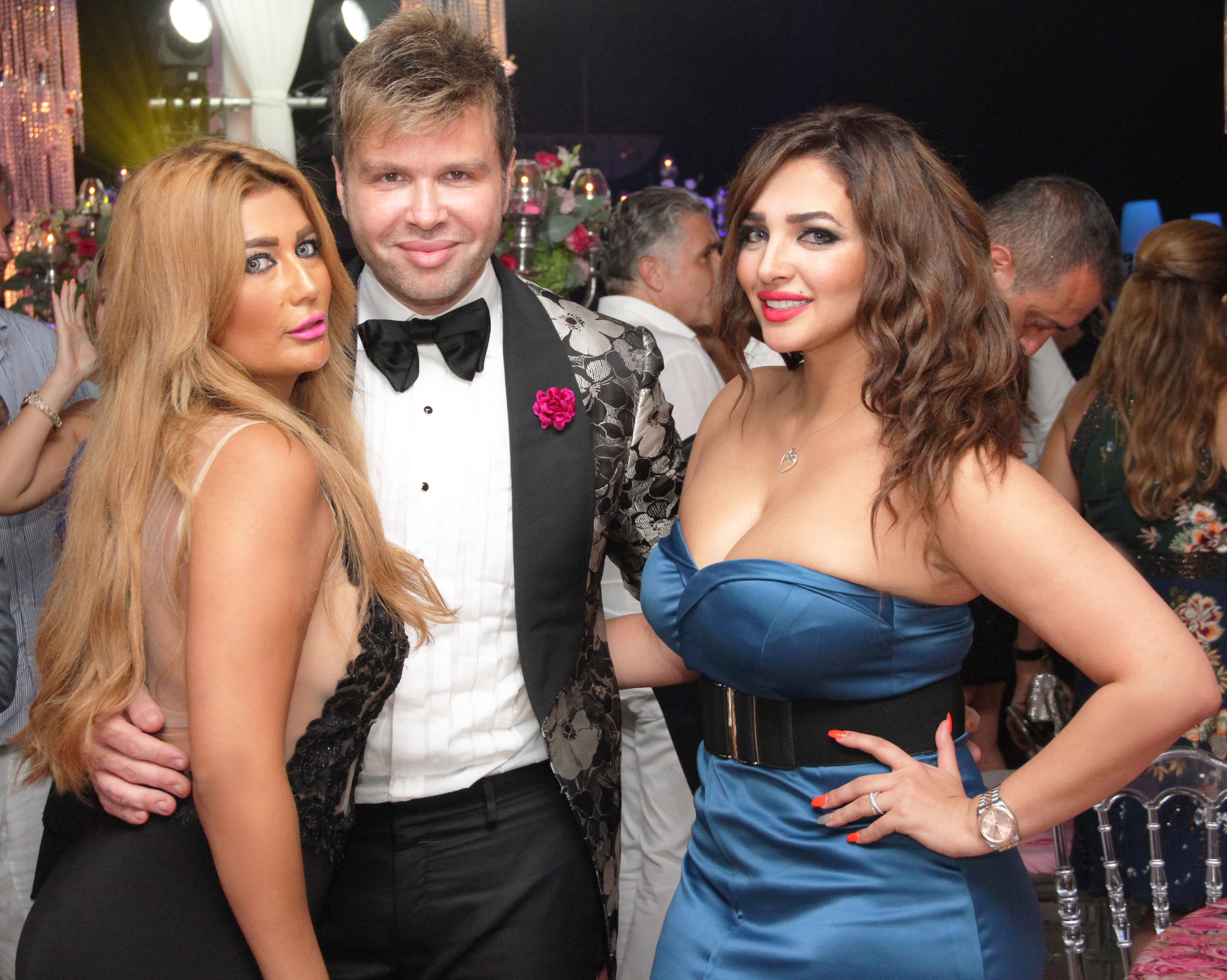
- Nicolas Jebran (middle) during a concert in August 2015
- Born: Beirut, Lebanon
- Labels: NJ; Jebran
- Website: www.nicolasjebran.com

Nicolas Jebran (Arabic: نيكولا جبران) is a Lebanese fashion designer famous for haute couture in addition to his line of accessories, shoes and bags called "Jebran".

== Life and career ==
Jebran started showing interest in art very early on. In the early 2000s, he established his fashion house in Beirut, Lebanon and launched his first line. He also continued his studies in design of jewelry and accessories in Beirut. His designs are worn by Katy Perry and other celebrities.
