= List of Lebanese people =

This is a list of notable individuals born and residing mainly in Lebanon.

Lebanese expatriates residing overseas and possessing Lebanese citizenship are also included.

== Activists ==
- Jill Kelley – advocate, socialite, and former diplomat
- Sandra Melhem – LGBT rights activist
- Aya Mouallem (born 1998) – electrical engineer, and gender equality activist
- Alexandre Paulikevitch – activist, dancer, choreographer
- Rose Shahfa (1890–6 August 1955) – women's rights activist
- Tarek Zeidan – LGBT rights activist

== Architecture ==
- Nabil Gholam – architect
- Salim Al-Kadi – architect and designer
- Joseph Philippe Karam – architect
- Nadim Karam – architect
- Bernard Khoury – architect

== Business ==
- Charles Corm (1894–1963) – writer, industrialist, and philanthropist
- Samir Brikho – businessman, Chief Executive of AMEC
- Ali Youssef Charara (living) – businessman and financier
- Walid Daouk – businessman and politician
- Ralph Debbas – automotive executive
- Salah Ezzedine – businessman arrested for running a pyramid scheme
- Carlos Ghosn – former CEO of Michelin North America, former chairman and CEO of Renault, former chairman of AvtoVAZ, former chairman and CEO of Nissan, and former chairman of Mitsubishi Motors
- Sam Hammam – former owner and president of Cardiff City F.C.
- Hind Hariri (born 1984) – entrepreneur, billionaire
- Nicolas Hayek – former owner of Swatch Group
- Ziad Raphael Nassar – celebrity wedding designer and entrepreneur, owner of Ziad Rapahel Nassar holding.
- Carlos Slim – investor, formerly the richest person in the world
- Philippe Ziade – entrepreneur, owner, and CEO of Growth Holdings

=== Beauty pageant winners ===
- Yasmina Zaytoun - Miss Lebanon 2024
- Dina Azar – Miss Lebanon 1995
- Joëlle Behlock – Miss Lebanon 1997
- Valerie Abou Chacra – Miss Lebanon 2015
- Jihane Almira Chedid – Puteri Indonesia Pariwisata 2020, Miss Supranational Asia 2021
- Rina Chibany – Miss Lebanon 2012
- Rima Fakih – Miss USA 2010
- Sonia Fares – Miss Lebanon 1969
- Lamitta Frangieh – Miss World Lebanon 2004
- Karen Ghrawi – Miss Lebanon 2013
- Saly Greige – Miss Lebanon 2014
- Perla Helou – Miss Lebanon 2017
- Annabella Hilal – Miss World Lebanon 2006
- Dominique Hourani – Miss Intercontinental 2003
- Bethany Kehdy – Miss World Lebanon 2001
- Nadine Wilson Njeim – Miss Lebanon 2007
- Nadine Nassib Njeim – Miss Lebanon 2004
- Gabrielle Bou Rached – Miss Lebanon 2005
- Daniella Rahme – Miss International Lebanon 2010
- Maya Reaidy – Miss Lebanon 2018
- Georgina Rizk – Miss Lebanon 1970/Miss Universe 1971
- Pamela Saadé – Miss Earth Lebanon 2008
- Christina Sawaya – Miss Lebanon 2001/Miss International 2002
- Marlène Talih – Miss Lebanon 1966
- Rosarita Tawil – Miss Lebanon 2008

=== Dancers ===
- Mousbah Baalbaki – belly dancer
- Dany Bustros (1959 – 1998) belly dancer, socialite, stage actress
- Alissar Caracalla (born 1974) – dance instructor, choreographer and art director
- Pierre Khadra – dancer, choreographer, and director
- The Mayyas – all-female alternative precision dance group
- Alexandre Paulikevitch – dancer, civil rights activist

=== Fashion designers ===
- Reem Acra – fashion designer
- Houssein Bazaza – fashion designer
- Georges Chakra – fashion designer
- Nicolas Jebran – fashion designer
- Rabih Kayrouz – fashion designer
- Rony Abou Hamdan -fashion designer
- Zuhair Murad – fashion designer
- Elie Saab – fashion designer
- Madame Salha – Lebanese dressmaker and fashion designer
- Tony Ward – fashion designer

== Writers and poets ==
- Charles Corm (1894–1963) – writer, industrialist, and philanthropist
- Butrus al-Bustani (1819–1883) – writer and scholar
- Salima Abi Rashed (1887–1919) – first Lebanese woman lawyer, journalist
- Maroun Abboud (1886–1962) – poet and writer
- Elia Abu Madi (1890–1957) – poet
- Said Akl (1912–2014) – poet, writer, and thinker
- Jeanne Arcache (1902–1961) – Francophone poet and novelist
- Zeina Hashem Beck – poet
- Nader El-Bizri (living) – philosopher and architect
- Andrée Chedid (1920–2011) – Egyptian-French poet and novelist of Lebanese descent
- Nayla Chidiac (born 1966) – French-Lebanese clinical psychologist, poet and essayist
- Michel Chiha (1891–1954) – writer, journalist, banker
- Alexandra Chreiteh (born 1987) – writer
- Fawaz Gerges (born 1958) – academic and author
- Mai Ghoussoub (1952–2007) – writer, publisher, human rights activist
- Zaynab Fawwaz (1860–1914) – poet, historian, women's rights activist
- Hedy Habra – Lebanese-American poet, novelist, literary critic and professor
- Joumana Haddad (born 1970) – writer and feminist
- Ounsi el-Hajj (1937–2014) – poet
- Salma Hage (born 1942) – writer and cook
- Labiba Hashim (1882–1952) – pioneer woman writer and journalist
- Jad Hatem (born 1952) – philosopher and poet
- Gibran Khalil Gibran (1883–1931) – artist, author and poet
- Anbara Salam Khalidi (1897–1986) – writer, translator, women's emancipation activist
- Elias Khoury (born 1948) – novelist and playwright
- Vénus Khoury-Ghata (1937–2026) – poet and writer
- Emily Fares Ibrahim (born 1914) – writer, feminist
- Amin Maalouf (born 1949) – novelist
- Mago (agricultural writer) – Carthaginian writer, author of an agricultural manual in Punic
- Esther Moyal (1874–1947) – writer and women's rights activist
- May Murr (1929–2008) – academic, writer and activist
- Jacqueline Massabki (died 2015) – writer and lawyer
- Khalil Mutran (1872–1949) – poet and journalist
- Mikha'il Na'ima (1889–1988) – religious author and poet
- Emily Nasrallah (1931–2018) – novelist, activist
- Amin al-Rihani (1876–1940) – writer and politician
- Widad Sakakini (1913–1991) – writer and feminist
- Georges Schéhadé (1905–1989) – Francophone playwright and poet
- Laurice Schehadé (1908–2009) – novelist and poet
- Hanan al-Shaykh – writer
- Ahmad Faris al-Shidyaq (1806–1887) – scholar, writer and journalist
- Avraham Sinai (born 1962) – religious writer
- Gabriel Sionita (1577–1648) – Maronite writer and publisher
- Amine Takiedine (1884–1937) – poet and writer
- Nassim Nicholas Taleb (born 1960) – author
- Nadia Tueni (1935–1983) – poet
- Ibrahim al-Yaziji (1847–1906) – philosopher, philologist, poet and journalist
- Nasif al-Yaziji (1800–1871) – author
- Warda al-Yaziji (1838–1924) – poet
- Iman Humaydan Younes (born 1956) – writer, researcher and creative writing professor
- Rania Zaghir (born 1977) – children's author
- Nazira Zain al-Din (1908–1976) – literary critic and women's emancipation activist
- May Ziadeh (1886–1941) – poet, essayist, and women's emancipation activist
- Jurji Zaydan (1861–1914) – writer and novelist, journalist

=== Film, television, and radio personalities ===
- Borhane Alaouié – film director
- Philippe Aractingi – Lebanese-French film director
- Maysa Assaf – television presenter
- Jihad Al-Atrash – actor
- Maroun Bagdadi – film director
- Hisham Bizri – film director
- Rowan Blanchard – American actress
- Maguy Bou Ghosn – actress
- Lucien Bourjeily – film and theater director, playwright, political activist
- Bassem Breish – film director
- Takla Chamoun – actress
- Ely Dagher – film director
- Sami Daher – actor
- Jean Daoud – film director
- George Diab – actor
- Ziad Doueiri – film director
- Imad Feghaly – actor
- Lamitta Frangieh – actress
- Daizy Gedeon – Australian-Lebanese filmmaker
- Marcel Ghanem – television anchor
- Renee Ghosh – actress
- Dan Haddad – film director
- Abdo Hakim – actor
- Hasan Hamdan – actor
- Jamal Hamdan – actor
- Saad Hamdan – actor
- Darine Hamze – actress, director, and producer
- Razane Jammal – British-Lebanese actress, model, and singer
- Julia Kassar – actress
- Sarah Khan – actress
- Noor Zafar Khan – actress
- Diana Ibrahim – actress
- Muhammad Ibrahim – actor
- Charbel Iskandar – actor
- Leïla Karam – actress
- Mona Karim – actress
- Mario Kassar – filmmaker, founder of Carolco Pictures
- Alek Keshishian – filmmaker of Lebanese-Armenian origin
- Georges Khabbaz – actor
- Arsinée Khanjian – actress of Lebanese-Armenian origin
- Louay Khraish – writer and producer
- Nadine Labaki – film director
- Samir Maalouf – actor
- Toni Maalouf – actor
- Julian Maroun - actor and producer
- Mahmoud Mabsout – actor
- Peter Macdissi – television and film actor
- Omar Mikati – actor
- Patrick Mubarak – actor
- Ismail Nanoua – actor
- Samara Nohra – actress
- George Noory – television, author, radio
- Nour – film actress
- Jeanine Pirro – television personality and author
- Ouday Raad – actor
- Bashar Rahal – Lebanese-Bulgarian actor
- Keanu Reeves – Canadian actor
- Fadi Rifai – actor
- Milad Rizk – actor
- Ali Saad – actor
- Hossam Al-Sabah – actor
- Khaled El Sayed – actor
- Faissal Sam Shaib – writer and producer
- Mira Shaib – writer and director
- Naji Shamil – actor
- Omar Al-Shammaa – actor
- Omar Sharif – actor
- Haaz Sleiman – television and film actor
- Rosie Al-Yaziji – actress
- Ali Al-Zein – actor
- Jamie Farr – actor

=== Food and drink ===
- Tara Khattar – chef and writer

== Models and Internet personalities ==
- AustinShow – Twitch streamer
- Annabella Hillal – TV presenter
- Hoda Ziade – Lebanese fashion model
- Nour Arida – model and brand ambassador
- Myriam Klink – model and entertainer

=== Singers, composers, and musicians ===
- Nancy Ajram – singer, actress
- Ragheb Alama – singer
- Ramy Ayach – singer and composer
- Julia Boutros – singer
- Sami Clark – singer
- Elissa – singer, actress
- Fairuz – singer
- Blu Fiefer – (born 1992) – singer-songwriter
- BVTVX – (born 1997) – Lebanese rapper/songwriter, artist, and political activist.
- Assi El Hallani – singer, actor
- Maher Jah (born 1990) – singer-songwriter
- Najwa Karam – singer, actress
- Wael Kfoury – singer
- Marcel Khalife – singer and composer
- Massari – singer
- Zaki Nassif – composer, singer
- Rahbani brothers – composers
  - Assi Rahbani
  - Mansour Rahbani
- Ziad Rahbani – musician, actor
- Majida El Roumi – singer
- Sabah – singer, actress
- Wadih El Safi – singer, composer, and musician
- Carole Samaha – singer
- Nasri Shamseddine – singer
- Hamed Sinno – singer-songwriter
- Walid Toufic – singer
- Maya Yazbek – singer
- Melhem Zein – singer
- Nawal Al Zoghbi – singer, actress

=== Theatre ===
- Alaa Minawi (born 1982) – Palestinian-Lebanese-Dutch multidisciplinary artist, lecturer
- Dayna Ash – poet, cultural activist
- Hassan Alaa Eddin – commonly known as Chouchou or Shoushou, actor, comedian
- Jalal Khoury – playwright, theatre director, comedian and artistic editor

=== Visual artists ===
- Reine Abbas – video game designer and artist
- Shafic Abboud (1926 – 2004) – painter
- Douglas Abdell – sculptor
- Samir Abi Rashed (born 1947) – painter
- Etel Adnan – painter, poet
- Jorge Adoum (1897–1958) – painter
- Krikor Agopian – painter
- Georges Akl – painter
- Joseph Assaf – sculptor
- Christina Assi - photojournalist
- Zena Assi – multidisciplinary artist
- Ayman Baalbaki (born 1975) – visual artist
- Ghazi Baker (born 1967) – painter
- Maha Bayrakdar (born 1947) – painter and poet
- Kiki Bokassa – visual artist
- Chaouki Chamoun – painter
- Rafic Charaf (1932–2003) – painter
- Saloua Raouda Choucair (1916–2017) – painter and sculptor
- Daoud Corm (1852–1930) – painter
- David Daoud (born 1970) – painter
- Derrie Fakhoury (1930–2015) – painter
- Moustafa Farroukh – painter
- Simone Fattal (born 1942) – artist
- Chucrallah Fattouh – painter
- Chawky Frenn – painter and art professor
- César Gemayel – painter
- Kahlil Gibran (1883–1931) – writer, poet and visual artist
- Paul Guiragossian (1926–1993) – painter
- Youssef Howayek (1883–1962) – sculptor and painter
- Lamia Joreige – visual artist and filmmaker
- Nabil Kanso (1940–2019) – Lebanese-American painter
- Nadim Karam (born 1957) – artist
- Helen Khal (1923–2009) – Lebanese-American artist
- Zena El Khalil (born 1976) – Lebanese artist, writer, and activist
- Layal Khawly – visual artist and painter
- Yolande Labaki (born 1927) – landscape painter
- Hussein Madi (born 1938) – painter, sculptor and printmaker
- Jamil Molaeb (born 1948) – artist
- Farid Mansour (1929–2010) – painter and sculptor
- Nabil Nahas (born 1949) – painter
- Wajih Nahlé (1932–2017) – painter and calligrapher
- Omar Onsi (1901–1969) – painter
- Walid Raad – artist
- Mohammad Rawas (born 1951) – painter and printmaker
- Aref El-Rayess (1928–2005) – painter
- Pierre Sadek (1938–2013) – caricaturist
- Samir Sammoun (born 1952) – artist and engineer
- Mouna Bassili Sehnaoui (born 1945) – painter, writer
- Hanibal Srouji (born 1957) – painter
- Lidya Tchakerian (born 1959) – artist
- Akram Zaatari – filmmaker, photographer, artist and curator
- Salwa Zeidan – artist, sculptor and curator
- Bibi Zogbé (1890–1973) – Lebanese-born painter based in Buenos Aires

== Education ==
- Nazek Abou Alwan Abed – Educator and writer
- Joseph E. Aoun – President of Northeastern University
- Nora Bayrakdarian – professor of international relations
- Alberto Bustani – former president of Monterrey Campus of Monterrey Institute of Technology and Higher Education
- Gabriel Hawawini – former Head and Dean of INSEAD

== Journalism ==
- Jad Al-Akhaoui – television and newspaper journalist
- Helen Thomas - journalist, White House Press Reporter and First Female member of the Gridiron Gang
- May Chidiac – television journalist
- Daizy Gedeon – former deputy foreign editor and first female sports journalist (The Australian)
- Marcel Ghanem – television journalist
- Adnan Al Kakoun – journalist/producer/director
- Octavia Nasr – former television journalist for CNN
- Ramzi Najjar – journalist and author
- Gebran Tueni – founder of An-Nahar
- Gebran Ghassan Tueni – journalist and politician
- Ghassan Tueni – journalist, politician and diplomat
- Nayla Tueni (born 1982) – journalist and politician
- Paula Yacoubian – television journalist and politician
- George Yammine – literature and arts critic of An-Nahar
- Philippe Ziade – journalist

== Military ==
- Joseph Aoun – army commander and president of Lebanon since 9 January 2025
- Emile Boustany – former army commander
- Jean Kahwaji – former army commander
- Samir El-Khadem – former commander of the Lebanese Naval Forces, author, historian
- Antoine Lahad (1927–2015) – Lebanese Army Major General, and subsequently leader of the South Lebanon Army
- Émile Lahoud – former army commander
- Jamil Al Sayyed – former Lebanese General Security Director
- Wafiq Jizzini – former Lebanese General Security Director
- Abbas Ibrahim – former Lebanese General Security Director
- Jean Njeim – former army commander
- Ibrahim Tannous – former army commander

== Religion ==
A series of Catholic popes from the Levant (also known as Syrian popes or popes of Eastern Origin) include: Pope Anicetus, Pope Constantine, Pope Gregory III, Pope Sergius I and Pope Sisinnius.

=== Religious personalities ===
Maronite patriarchs

- Estephan El Douaihy – former Maronite Patriarch (1670–1704)
- Elias Peter Hoayek – former Maronite Patriarch (1898–1931)
- Anthony Peter Khoraish – former Maronite Patriarch (1975–1986)
- Bechara Boutros al-Rahi – Maronite Patriarch (2011–)
- Nasrallah Boutros Sfeir – former Maronite Patriarch (1986–2011)

Muslim scholars

- Abū ʿAmr ʿAbd al-Raḥmān ibn ʿAmr al-ʾAwzāʿī (Arabic: أبو عمرو عبدُ الرحمٰن بن عمرو الأوزاعي) (707–774)
- Musa al-Sadr – Shiite religious leader
- Muhammad Jamaluddin al-Makki al-Amili – Shi'a scholar (1334–1385)
- Nur-al-Din al-Karaki al-ʿĀmilī (1465–1534) – Shiite scholar who was a member of the Safavid court
- Al-Hurr al-Aamili – muhaddith and a prominent Twelver Shi'a scholar (1624–1693)
- Bahāʾ al-dīn al-ʿĀmilī – Shi'a Islamic scholar (1547–1621)
- Mohammad Hussein Fadlallah – Shiite cleric (1935–2010)
- Hassan Khaled – Sunni cleric, Mufti of the Lebanese Republic (1966–1989)

Others

- Aram I Keshishian – Catholicos of the Armenian Apostolic Church, See of the Great House of Cilicia (in Antelias, Lebanon)
- Elias Ziadé (clergyman)
- Salim Ghazal – Melkite Greek Catholic bishop (1931–2011)

=== Saints ===
- Charbel Makhlouf
- Nimatullah Kassab
- Rafqa Pietra Choboq Ar-Rayès
- Raphael Hawawini

== Politicians ==
=== Presidents of Lebanon ===
- Joseph Aoun – current president (2025– Now)
- Michel Aoun – former president (2016–2022)
- Camille Chamoun – former president (1952–1958)
- Fuad Chehab – former president (1958–1964)
- Émile Eddé – former president (1936–1941)
- Suleiman Frangieh – former president (1970–1976)
- Amine Gemayel – former president (1982–1988)
- Bachir Gemayel – former president-elect (1982-murdered)
- Charles Helou – former president (1964–1970)
- Elias Hrawi – former president (1989–1998)
- Bechara El Khoury – former president (1943–1952)
- Émile Jamil Lahoud – former president (1998–2007)
- René Moawad – former president (1989-murdered)
- Elias Sarkis – former president (1976–1982)
- Michel Sleiman – former president (2008–2014)
- Petro Trad – former president (1943)

=== Politicians in other countries ===
- Luis Abinader – President of the Dominican Republic (2020–Present)
- Mario Abdo Benítez – President of Paraguay (2018–2023)
- Geraldo Alckmin – Vice President of Brazil (2023–Present)
- Abdalá Bucaram – former president of Ecuador (1996–1997)
- Jamil Mahuad – former president of Ecuador (1998–2000)
- Julio Teodoro Salem – former president of Ecuador (1944)
- Michel Temer – former president of Brazil (2016–2018)
- Julio César Turbay Ayala – former president of Colombia (1978–1982)

=== Speakers of Parliament ===
- Nabih Berri – Camper on his seats since 1992 (30 years)
- Kamel Asaad – former Speaker of Parliament
- Sabri Hamadé – former Speaker of Parliament
- Hussein el-Husseini – former Speaker of Parliament
- Adel Osseiran – former Speaker of Parliament

=== Prime Ministers of Lebanon ===
- Nawaf Salam – current prime minister
- Ahmad Daouk – former prime minister
- Amin al-Hafez – former prime minister
- Rafic Hariri – former prime minister
- Saad Hariri – former prime minister
- Selim al-Hoss – former prime minister
- Omar Karami – former prime minister
- Rashid Karami – former prime minister
- Najib Mikati – former prime minister
- Saeb Salam – former prime minister
- Tammam Salam – former prime minister
- Fouad Siniora – former prime minister
- Riad as-Solh – former prime minister
- Sami as-Solh – former prime minister
- Takieddin el-Solh – former prime minister
- Shafik Wazzan – former prime minister
- Abdallah El-Yafi – former prime minister
- Chafic Al Wazzan – former prime minister
- Hussain Alouieni – former prime minister
- Omar Karami – former prime minister
- Hassan Diab – former prime minister

=== Political personalities ===
- Georges Ibrahim Abdallah (born 1951) - communist militant serving a life sentence for complicity in murder
- Emir Majid Arslan – independence leader
- Prince Talal Arslan – Druze leader and president of the Lebanese Democratic Party
- Raymond Baaklini – (1943–2013) Lebanese ambassador to Canada
- Gebran Bassil – minister, Free Patriotic Movement
- Dany Chamoun – former National Liberal Party leader
- Dory Chamoun – National Liberal Party leader
- Khaled Daouk – former Honorary Consul General of Ireland in Beirut
- Walid Daouk – former minister of Information and Justice
- Jad Demian – head of the Lebanese Forces Youth Association
- Carlos Edde – politician
- Raymond Edde – politician, former leader of National Bloc
- Juliette Elmir – nurse and political activist
- Issam Fares – businessman and politician, former deputy prime minister
- Suleiman Frangieh, Jr. – politician, leader of the Marada Movement
- Tony Frangieh – politician
- Maurice Gemayel – founder of Institute for Palestine Studies
- Pierre Gemayel – politician and founder of the Kataeb Party
- Pierre Amine Gemayel – legislator and minister
- Samir Geagea – leader of the Lebanese Forces
- Fadi Frem - former leader of the Lebanese Forces
- Fouad Abou Nader - former leader of the Lebanese Forces
- Elie Hobeika - former leader of the Lebanese Forces
- Marwan Hamadeh – former minister (6 times) and part of the Lebanese Parliament since 1992, politician and influential presence
- Kamal Jumblatt – founder of Progressive Socialist Party
- Walid Jumblatt – politician, leader of the Progressive Socialist Party
- Sobhi Mahmassani – legal scholar, former deputy and minister
- Charles Malik – former president of the United Nations General Assembly and Minister of Foreign Affairs
- Talal El Merhebi – politician and former deputy and minister, leader of Akkar area
- Nayla Moawad – politician
- Elias Murr – former deputy prime minister
- Gabriel Murr – politician; owner of Murr Television and Mount Lebanon Radio Station
- Michel Murr – politician and former deputy prime minister
- Abbas al-Musawi (1952–1992) - secretary-general of Hezbollah
- Hassan Nasrallah (1960–2024) – leader of Hezbollah
- Ali Hussein Nassif (d. 2012) - politician and high-ranking founding member of Hezbollah
- Salim Saadeh – economist and politician
- Habib Sadek – former politician, writer
- Violette Khairallah Safadi (born 1981) – politician, television personality and social activist
- Ibrahim Amin al-Sayyed (born 1960) - Head of the Political Council of Hezbollah
- Gebran Tueni – journalist and deputy

=== Other political personalities ===
- Alain Aoun – nephew of former president Michel Aoun
- Caroline Ziadeh – Lebanese diplomat
- Joyce Gemayel – former first lady and political activist
- Ghassan Tueni – diplomat, politician and journalist

== Sciences ==
=== Medicine ===
- Afif Abdul Wahab – surgeon
- Amin J. Barakat – Lebanese-American physician known for the diagnosis Barakat syndrome
- Anthony Atala – American Director of the Wake Forest Institute for Regenerative Medicine
- Edma Abouchdid – physician; first Lebanese woman to obtain a doctorate of medicine
- Sami Ibrahim Haddad – physician, surgeon and writer
- Michael Debakey – Lebanese-American Cardiovascular Surgeon who pioneered many surgical techniques and procedures
- Saniya Habboub – medical doctor known for being the first Lebanese woman to study medicine abroad
- Ali A Haydar – physician who is an emeritus professor at the American University of Beirut
- Israa Seblani – Lebanese-American physician and endocrinologist
- Afif Abdul Wahab – medical doctor, general surgeon and urologist
- Michael DeBakey – American vascular surgeon and cardiac surgeon
- Emile Riachi – orthopaedic surgeon
- Fuad Sami Haddad – neurosurgeon, humanitarian, and writer
- Sami A. Sanjad – Lebanese-American pediatrician
- Tony Nader – neuroscientist, university president, author and leader of the Transcendental Meditation movement.
- Farid Fata – hematologist/oncologist and the mastermind of one of the largest health care frauds in U.S. history.
- Nabil F. Saba – American oncologist and professor of hematology and medical oncology at Emory University School of Medicine
- Elias I. Traboulsi – physician in the fields of ophthalmic genetics and pediatric ophthalmology
- Toni Choueiri – Lebanese American medical oncologist and researcher
- Naji Abumrad – Lebanese-American surgeon

==== Psychiatry ====
- Aziz al-Abub – psychiatrist and medical torture expert affiliated with Hezbollah
- Hagop S. Akiskal – Lebanese-born American psychiatrist and professor
- Gad Saad (born 1964) - Lebanese-born JewishCanadian evolutionary behavioral scientist

=== Scientists ===
==== Archeology ====
- Maurice Chehab – archaeologist and museum curator, father of "modern Lebanese archaeology"
- George El Andary – researcher in archaeology, museums and manuscripts
- Leila Badre – director of the Archaeological Museum of the American University of Beirut
- Maya Haïdar Boustani – archaeologist and curator of the Museum of Lebanese Prehistory
- Assaad Seif – archaeologist and associate professor in archaeology at the Lebanese University

==== Astronomy ====
- Charles Elachi – astronomer and professor of electrical engineering, former director of Jet Propulsion Laboratory and vice president of Caltech
- Doris Daou – Director for Education and Public Outreach of the NASA Lunar Science Institute

==== Biology ====
- Pierre Zalloua – biologist and researcher
- M. Amin Arnaout – nephrologist best known for seminal discoveries in the biology and structure of integrin receptors.
- Myrna T. Semaan – botanist, notable for identifying a number of new plant species in Lebanon with Ricardius M. Haber.
- Asmar Asmar – specialization in cardiology
- Huda Zoghbi – Lebanese-born American geneticist
- Jack Makari – Lebanese-American cancer immunologist
- Justine Sergent – researcher in the cognitive neuroscience field

==== Chemistry and materials science ====
- Niveen Khashab – chemist and professor known for her contributions in the field of drugs and Chemistry, L'Oréal-UNESCO For Women in Science Awards laureate
- Hassan Naim – Lebanese-Swiss biochemist
- Mona Nemer – Lebanese-Canadian biochemist
- Najat A. Saliba – professor of analytical chemistry and an atmospheric chemist at the American University of Beirut
- Ziad Rafiq Beydoun – petroleum geologist and emeritus Professor at the American University of Beirut
- George Doumani – Lebanese Palestinian geologist and explorer

==== Computing and engineering ====
- Mario El-Khoury – Lebanese-Swiss engineer and business executive
- Hassan Kamel Al-Sabbah – Lebanese-American electrical and electronic engineer and technology innovator known for receiving 43 patents in television transmission
- Nadim Kobeissi – French-Lebanese computer science researcher specialized in applied cryptography

==== Physics ====
- Ali Chamseddine – physicist known for his contributions in particle physics, general relativity and mathematical physics
- Edgar Choueiri – Lebanese-American physicist known for his work on Plasma propulsion engine and for conceiving and developing new spacecraft propulsion concepts
- Rammal Rammal – condensed matter physicist
- Ani Aprahamian – Lebanese-born Armenian-American nuclear physicist
- Eid Hourany – French-Lebanese nuclear physicist
- Hassan Khachfe – innovator, researcher and professor
- Salwa Nassar – nuclear physicist and college administrator known for being the first Lebanese woman to earn a PhD in physics
- Bahāʾ al-dīn al-ʿĀmilī – Islamic scholar, philosopher, architect, mathematician, astronomer and poet
- Rammal Rammal – condensed matter physicist
- Ghassan Afiouni – inventor, developed a kind of compressed wood that cannot be burned

== Sports personalities ==
=== Athletes ===
- Samir Bannout – Lebanese-American professional bodybuilder who won the prestigious Mr. Olympia competition in 1983. Nicknamed the "Lion of Lebanon"
- Maxime Chaya – extreme sports athlete
- Zakaria Chihab – sportsman and Olympian
- Nabil Choueiri – track and field athlete and Olympian
- Maya Nassar – Dutch-Lebanese fitness model
- Jalal Bazzaz – known for his involvement in the Lebanese national team during the Rugby world cup. He also drives a c35 laurel

=== American/Canadian football ===
- David Azzi – football player in the Canadian Football League (CFL)

=== Automobile racing ===
- Khalil Beschir – professional race car driver
- Tony Kanaan – Brazilian professional race car driver
- Noel Jammal – Lebanese-Spanish professional race car driver
- Felipe Nasr – Brazilian professional race car driver
- Graham Rahal – American professional race car driver
- Toni Breidinger – American professional race car driver

=== Baseball ===
- Joe Lahoud – Lebanese-American retired Major League baseball player for over 11 years

=== Basketball ===
- Ramy Akiki – basketball player
- Wael Arakji – basketball player
- Rony Fahed – basketball player
- Matt Freije – Lebanese-American basketball player
- Fadi El Khatib – basketball player
- Ali Mahmoud – Lebanese-Canadian basketball player
- Elie Mechantaf – basketball player
- Bashir Saad – professional basketball player
- Rony Seikaly – Lebanese-American professional basketball player
- Joe Vogel – American-Lebanese professional basketball player and member of Lebanon's national team
- Jackson Vroman – American-born Lebanese professional basketball player and member of Lebanon's national team
- Marwan Ziade – Lebanese basketball player

=== Ice hockey ===
- Ed Hatoum – Lebanese-born Canadian former professional hockey player for the Vancouver Canucks
- Nazem Kadri – Canadian professional hockey player for the Calgary Flames
- Alain Nasreddine – Canadian former professional hockey player for the Pittsburgh Penguins

=== Football ===
- Faisal Antar – football player
- Roda Antar – football player
- Mohammed Ghaddar – football player in Syria
- Wartan Ghazarian – football player of Armenian origin
- Moussa Hojeij – football player/manager
- Youssef Mohamad – football player in Germany
- Soony Saad – football player
- Jamal Taha – football player
- Claudio Husaín – football player of Argentina

=== Playing card tournament titleholders ===
- Kassem 'Freddy' Deeb
- Ihsan 'Sammy' Farha
- Joseph 'Joe' Hachem - Lebanese-Australian

=== Rugby league ===
- Hazem El Masri – Canterbury-Bankstown Bulldogs player and highest NRL point scorer
- Anthony Farah – hooker for the West Tigers in the New South Wales Cup
- Robbie Farah - former NRL player, most notably for the Wests Tigers
- Tim Mannah - former NRL player for the Parramatta Eels
- Mitchell Moses - current NRL player for the Parramatta Eels
- Jacob Kiraz - current NRL player for the Canterbury-Bankstown Bulldogs
- Adam Doueihi - current NRL player for the Wests Tigers
- Josh Mansour - former NRL player, most notably for the Penrith Panthers
- David Bayssari - former NRL player for the Wests Tigers and coach of the Lebanese national team
- Benny Elias - former NRL player for the Balmain Tigers who is an inductee in the National Rugby League Hall of Fame

=== Rugby Union ===
- Ahmad Harajly – American World Rugby Sevens Series USA Rugby player and first Arab American rugby athlete to represent the US; professional athlete for Major League Rugby for the New England Free Jacks

=== Skiing ===
- Ibrahim Jaja

== See also ==
- Lebanese diaspora
- List of Lebanese people (Diaspora)
