= Chidiac =

Chidiac is a Levantine surname. Notable people with the surname include:

- Alex Chidiac (born 1999), Australian soccer player
- Antoine Chidiac (born 1952), Lebanese judoka
- Daniel Chidiac, Australian writer
- Jorge Estefan Chidiac (born 1963), Mexican politician
- May Chidiac (born 1963), Lebanese journalist and politician
- Nayla Chidiac (born 1966) French-Lebanese clinical psychologist, poet and essayist
