= Ghassan (given name) =

- Pronunciation: Arabic: [ɣasːaːn]
- Gender: Male

Origin
- Origin: Arabic
- Meaning: Youthful

Other names
- Alternative spelling: "Ghasan", "Gassan", "Gasan"

Ghassan (Arabic: غسان) is an Arabic given name, the name of the founder of the Christian Ghassan dynasty (Ghassanids). It is used among Muslims, Christians, and Druze. Notable people with the name include:

- Abu Ghassan (born 1953), Palestinian politician
- Ghassan Abu-Sittah (born 1969), Palestinian-British surgeon
- Ghassan Achi (born 1993), Lebanese skier
- Ghassan Alian (born 1972), Israeli commander of the IDF Golani Brigade
- Ghassan Afiouni (born 1972), Lebanese scientist
- Ghassan Andoni (born 1956), Palestinian Christian physicist and peace activist
- Ghassan Ashqar (1937–2022), Lebanese politician
- Ghassan Ben Jeddou (born 1962), Tunisian/Lebanese journalist
- Ghassan Elashi (born 1953), Palestinian American imprisoned political/charitable activist
- Ghassan Hage (born 1957), Lebanese/Australian anthropologist and social theorist
- Ghassan Ibrahim (born 1977), Syrian journalist
- Ghassan Rahbani (born 1964), Lebanese producer, songwriter and composer
- Ghassan Salhab (born 1958), Lebanese screenwriter, film director, and producer
- Ghassan al-Sharbi (born 1974), Saudi held in Guantanamo Bay
- Ghassan Kanafani (1936–1972), assassinated Palestinian poet and writer
- Ghassan Khatib (born 1954), Palestinian politician
- Ghassan Massoud (born 1958), Syrian actor and filmmaker
- Ghassan Muhsen (born 1945), Iraqi diplomat
- Ghassan Shabaneh, Arab-American political academic
- Ghassan Shakaa (1943–2018), Palestinian politician
- Ghassan Tueni (1926–2012), Lebanese diplomat and journalist
- Ghassan Saliba (born 1956), Lebanese musical artist
- Ghassan al-Zamel (born 1963), Syrian politician
