= Maysaa =

Maysaa, Mayssa, or Maysa is a feminine given name of Arabic origin. Notable people with the given name include:

== Given name ==
=== Maysa ===
- Maysa Assaf, Lebanese television presenter, fashion journalist, and celebrity stylist
- Maysa Ghadeer, Emirati educator, writer, and politician
- Maysa Jbarah (born 1989), Jordanian footballer
- Maysa Leak (born 1966), American jazz singer
- Maysa Wali Jaxateh Manneh, West African king
- Maysa Matarazzo (1936–1977), Brazilian singer-songwriter, performer, and actress
- Maysa Hussain Matrood (born 1977), Iraqi runner
- Maysa Pardayeva (born 2005), Turkmen judoka
- Maysa Rejepova (born 1993), Turkmen sprinter
- Maysaa Sabreen (born 1974), Syrian economist and public servant

=== Mayssa ===
- Mayssa Bastos (born 1997), Brazilian jiu-jitsu competitor
- Mayssa Jallad (born 1990), Lebanese singer, songwriter, and urban researcher
- Mayssa Karaa (born 1989), Lebanese-American singer-songwriter
- Mayssa Maghrebi (born 1978), Emirati-Moroccan actress
- Mayssa Pessoa (born 1984), Brazilian handball player

== See also ==
- Maysa: Quando Fala o Coração, Brazilian television series
