= Hassan Hamdan =

Hassan Hamdan may refer to:

- Hasan Hamdan, Lebanese actor and voice actor
- Hassan Abdullah Hamdan or Mahdi Amel (born 1936), Lebanese journalist and poet
