= Sharara (disambiguation) =

Sharara is a 1984 Indian film.

Sharara may also refer to:

- "Sharara", a song by Jeet–Pritam and Asha Bhosle from the 2002 Indian film Mere Yaar Ki Shaadi Hai
- Sharara (surname)
- El Sharara oil field, Murzuk, Libya
- Nickname of Mohammad Abu Zrayq, Jordanian footballer
- ash-Sharara, or Iskra, former communist organization in Egypt
