= Hoda Ziade =

Lebanese fashion model

- هدى زيادة
- Born: 1940 (age 85–86); Lebanon
- Occupation: Model
- Years active: 2019–present

Hoda Ziade (also spelled Ziadé; Arabic: هدى زيادة; born c. 1940) is a Lebanese model. She began modeling in 2019 for Emergency Room, an independent Beirut-based fashion brand founded by her grandson, designer Éric Mathieu Ritter. She has appeared in regional and international publications, including Marie Claire Arabia, Savoir Flair.

== Early life ==
Ziade was born in Lebanon in 1940. As a child, she practiced ballet and learned to play the piano. She had no experience in commercial media or modeling before beginning her modeling work in her eighties. Prior to the rise of mass ready-to-wear, she designed her own clothing and overseaw their construction. She considered a career in mental health and did not aspire to become a model.

== Modeling career ==
Ziade's involvement in fashion began by chance, entering modeling in 2019–2020 through her grandson, Éric Mathieu Ritter, who established the sustainable fashion label Emergency Room in Beirut. The brand uses upcycled textiles and casts non-professional local models instead of agency talent. Ziade appeared in lookbooks, promotional photographs, and runway events for the label; her images circulated across fashion publications and online platforms. In 2021, she was featured in an editorial for Marie Claire Arabia and in a series for Savoir Flair focused on creative figures in Lebanon. She also modeled in events featuring student collections from ESMOD Beirut. Profiles on Ziade and her work with Emergency Room were later published by regional and international media outlets. Press coverage of Ziade has often noted that older women rarely appear in fashion campaigns in the region.

== Personal life ==
Ziade has two daughters; in an interview, she said that modeling was a way to cope with grief after her husband's death.
