= Sharara (surname) =

Sharara or Charara (Arabic: شرارة) is a surname:

- Ali Youssef Charara
- Adham Sharara
- Hadi Sharara
- Hassan Abu Sharara
- Hayat Sharara
- Riad Sharara
- Zakaria Charara
