= Raymond Baaklini =

Lebanese diplomat (1943–2013)

Raymond Abdo Hatim Baaklini (12 October 1943 – 2013) was the Lebanese ambassador to Canada between 15 September 2000 and 20 January 2007. He had a long history in serving the Lebanese diplomatic corp. He was an ambassador among others to France and Libya. He was born in Bzebdine, a village in Mount Lebanon.

He was part of a well known and old Maronite family descendant of the Kairouz and Helou families from the north of Lebanon.

In August 2003, he made controversial comments suggesting that Jews or Zionists control 90% of Canadian media. He stated this following the diplomatic crisis between Lebanon and Canada due to the arrest of Bruce Balfour, a Canadian priest, in Lebanon. Therefore, Baaklini replied the accusations of the Canadian newspapers expressing these views.

He died in his home country, Lebanon, in 2013.
