= Sanaoud Baad Kalil =

- Genre: Drama
- Created by: Rafi Wahbi
- Directed by: Al Laith Hijo
- Country of origin: Syria
- Original language: Arabic
- No. of seasons: 1
- No. of episodes: 30

Production
- Production company: Clacket Media

Original release
- Release: 10 July 2013

Sanaoud Baad Kalil (Arabic: سنعود بعد قليل) is a 2013 Syrian drama television series. It was first aired in Ramadan, and the filming location is in Lebanon.

== Plot ==
Spin the conditions of the series in the social context, where Najib decides to leave his home in Damascus because of deteriorating health conditions and travels to Lebanon for circumstances in the country to discover that his children are far away from life that he thinks they live.

The series is social drama most of events in Lebanon, His stars are six brothers and his father is Najib that came from Damascus.

== Cast ==
- Duraid Lahham as Najib
- Takla Chamoun
- Bassel Khayyat as Kareem
- Abed Fahed as Sami
- Naji Makhoul
- Hasan Hamdan
- Ouday Raad
- Ali Tahan
- Pierre Dagher
- Kosai Khauli as Fouad
- Kinda Alloush
- Sulafa Memar
- Rafi Wahbi as Raji
- Nadine Al Rassi as Dina
