= George Doumani =

Palestinian American geologist

George Alexander Doumani (16 April 1929 – 16 March 2021) was a Lebanese Palestinian geologist and explorer.

== Early life and education ==
George Alexander Doumani was born in Akko, British Mandate of Palestine, on 16 April 1929. He joined Terra Sancta College in Jerusalem and awarded the Palestinian matric in 1948. Doumani began working in the legal profession. During the 1948 Palestinian expulsion and flight he left with his family to Bkassine village in Lebanon. He and his brother went to Saudi Arabia in 1949/50 and worked for the oil company, Saudi Aramco, supervising laboratory testing and inspecting tankers. Contact with Americans there led him to move to the US to pursue higher education.

Doumani graduated with a Bachelor’s degree in paleontology from University of California, Berkeley in 1956, with a thesis titled Stratigraphy of the San Pablo Group, Contra Costa County California.

== Career ==
Doumani joined the International Geophysical Year in 1957 and 1958 in Antarctica, doing fieldwork at Byrd Station. Doumani made other trips to the southern continent in the early 1960s. His findings helped prove the continental drift theory. Two Antarctic mountains are named after him: Mount Doumani and Doumani Peak. His name was also included in that of fossil crustacean he identified in Antarctica, Cyzicus doumanii.

In 1963, Doumani joined the Science and Technology Division of the Library of Congress, where he worked on the Antarctic Bibliography. He subsequently worked for the Congressional Research Service. From 1970 to 1971, he was the president of The Antarctican Society. In 1976, Doumani was a presidential appointee to the Peace Corps in Yemen.

In 1999 he published a book about Antarctica, The Frigid Mistress: Life and Exploration in Antarctica. Doumani died in Washington D.C. on 16 March 2021, at the age of 91.

Doumani was interviewed for the Byrd Polar Research Center Archival Program in 2001. In 2005, Doumani was honored with an exhibit at the opening of the Arab American National Museum in Michigan, to which he donated artefacts from his life and career.
