= George Yammine =

Lebanese poet, literature

George Yammine (Arabic: جورج يمين; Ǧōrǧ Yammīn; born in Zgharta, Lebanon on April 10, 1955 - died in Lebanon in 2000) was a Lebanese poet, media manager, and literature and arts critic in An-Nahar daily newspaper.

Earning a BA in Arabic literature, he became the director of Radio Free and United Lebanon from the years 1984 to 1987. During this last year of 1987, he was appointed as the Director of the National Press in the North of Lebanon. He was also a member of the Association of Writers, Composers and Publishers of Music (SASEM).

George Yammine was known for writing lyrics to songs that ranged from a number of different topics, and were sung by a number of famous Lebanese artists. Titles include:

- Oumeima El Khalil - Yā Rifāqī l-Abriyāʾ (Oh My Innocent Comrades)
- Samira Toufiq - 3a Neba3 Mar Sarkis jinna
- Sammy 7awat - 3al Midan Tlaqaina
- Joseph Nassif - El Ma3moura bil Koura
- Wadi3 el-Safiy - El-youbil
- Nour al Malla7 - Baddy B'Ailou
- George Wassouf - Dally Tlejy
- Ghassan Saliba - Ehden 3arouss
- 3azar Habib - Ehden Jammal
- Majida El Roumi - Ha Ataiyna
- Ragheb Aalameh - Hab Al Hawa
- George Wassouf - Jayii Ana Ghanni
- Ghassan Shedrawi - Jinna 3al Midan
- Samir Yazbek - Kamshet etTrab
- Joseph Abou Malheb - Khalf Al
- Ragheb Aalameh - Layl W'taljj
- Ghassan Shedrawi - Layl Wa Dabab
- Asmara - Ya Layl Ehden Ya Hellou
- Hayyam Younes and Joseph Abou Mrad
- Saba7 - Tal El-rabei3
- Hayyam Younes - Tal El-rabei3
- Yola Bandali - Waraq Al Khariif (Autumn Leaves)
- Joseph Abou Melheb - Ya Tiyarra

Yammine also wrote a script for a children's movie called Amani Under the Rainbow. The lyrics to the songs in it were also written by him.

George Yammine died in the year 2000. He was given the Lebanese Medal of Honor.
