= Adnan Al Kakoun =

Lebanese journalist and businessman (born 1967)

- Born: 1967 (age 58–59)
- Occupation: Journalism
- Known for: Journalism, Directing and Producing

Adnan Al Kakoun (Arabic: عدنان القاقون; born 1967) is a Lebanese journalist and businessman. As of 2019, he has over two decades of experience in politics.

== Early years ==
Adnan was born in Beirut, Lebanon in 1967.

== Career ==
Adnan began his career in Al Anwar then moved to Al-Anbaa until 1996-1997, before he moved to Al-Qabas for around 20 Years. He also worked in Al-Jarida for a short period of time. He also directs/produces documentary movies that are broadcast in most of the Arab world but primarily on Murr Television.
