= Widad Sakakini =

Syrian writer and critic

Widad Sakakini (Arabic: وداد سكاكيني; 1913–1991) was a writer and critic from Syria.

== Life ==
Sakakini was born 1913 in Sidon, Ottoman Syria (now Lebanon) to a Damascene father and a Lebanese mother. She studied under the theologian Mustapha Al-Ghalayini in Beirut. She wrote for the literary weekly al-Makshouf before marrying poet Zaki Mahasin in 1932 and moving to Mandatory Syria. There she wrote for her husband's newspaper, al-Muqtabas.

She published her first book, Maraya al-nas in 1945, which may be the first published collection of short stories by an Arab woman. She achieved another first in 1949 with the publication of her first novel, Arwa bint al-khutub, described as the first true novel published by an Arab woman. The novel tells the story of a woman, Arwa, who is falsely accused of adultery by her husband's brother. She is convicted by a judge, stoned, and banished from Damascus. She suffers many persecutions before obtaining vengeance. Sakakini intended for the book to illuminate the "slander and abasement that women have endured" in Arab society.

In total, Sakakini published five collection of short stories, two novels, and numerous essays, article and criticisms.

== Works ==
- Maraya al-nas (People's Mirrors), 1945.
- Bayn ai-Nil wa-I-nakhil (Between the Nile and the Palm Tree), 1947.
- al-Hubb al-muharram (Forbidden Love), 1947.
- Arwa bint al-khutub (Arwa, Daughter of Woe), 1949.
- al-Sitar al-marfu' (The Raised Curtain), 1955.
- Nufus tatakallmn (Souls Speak), 1962.
- Aqwa min al-sinin (Stronger Than the Years), 1978.
