= Ziad Raphael Nassar =

Lebanese celebrity wedding designer

- زياد رفايال نصار
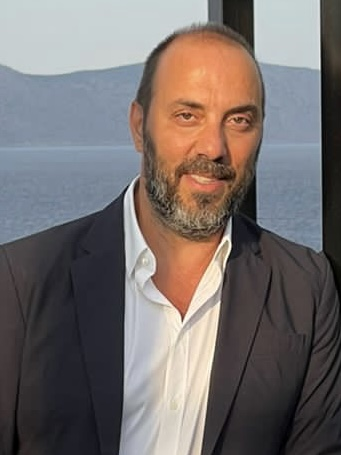
- Born: 22 October 1969 (age 57); Byblos, Lebanon
- Occupations: Celebrity event planner, wedding planner, author

Ziad Raphael Nassar (Arabic: زياد رفايال نصار, born 22 October 1969) is a Lebanese celebrity wedding designer, luxury event designer, author, and entrepreneur. His work was featured in regional and international fashion and lifestyle magazines and publishing houses, including Assouline Publishing, Architectural Digest, Harper's Bazaar, Vanity Fair, and Vogue.

== Early life and education ==
Nassar was born in Byblos, Lebanon, where he attended school. He pursued his higher education in fine arts at the Academie Libanaise des Beaux Arts from which he graduated in 1992.

== Career ==
After his graduation, Nassar worked in advertising in Lebanon before traveling to Egypt in 1998, where he served as art director for a local advertising agency. In 2004, a chance favor for a friend, who had asked him to organize his eight hundred-guest wedding, was Nassar's first venture into this domain. A Saudi royal who was among the attendees was so impressed that he offered Nassar to plan his son's wedding. One year later, Nassar relocated to Riyadh to pursue his new wedding designer career. He returned to his native Lebanon in 2007, where he established Once, a wedding design company.

Nassar is best known for designing extravagant, themed weddings, catering to the Middle Eastern and Gulf Arab countries' elite. His event designing list includes Elie Saab Jr.'s wedding to Lebanese socialite Christina Mourad, the wedding of Miss Lebanon 2007 Nadine Wilson Njeim, the wedding of Malek, son of Lebanese billionaire and prime minister Najib Mikati, and more than fifty Saudi royal weddings.

Book publishers and owners of luxury lifestyle company, Prosper and Martine Assouline, attended a conference at the Regent's College in London where they met Nassar, and in 2012, Assouline published Once Weddings, a luxury design coffee table book covering more than a hundred of Nassar's wedding designs. Nassar wrote another eponymous work in 2020, also published by Assouline. In 2021, Ziad Raphael Nassar and his team at Once were selected to manage the Lebanese Pavilion at Expo 2020 held in Dubai.

== Publications ==
- Once Weddings (2012)
- Ziad Raphael Nassar: Designing the World's Greatest Weddings (2020)

== Bibliography ==
- Nassar, Ziad Raphael (2012). Once Weddings. Perseus Distribution Services. ISBN 978-1-61428-048-4.
- Nassar, Ziad Raphael (2020). Ziad Raphael Nassar. Assouline. ISBN 978-1-61428-934-0.
