= Marcel Ghanem =

Lebanese journalist

Marcel Louis Ghanem
- Marcel Ghanem in 2020
- Born: 4 April 1964, 64 Years Old; Yahchouch, Lebanon
- Occupations: Journalist and TV Host
- Years active: 1991 – Present
- Known for: Host of Kalam AL NASS, Sar El wa2et

Marcel Ghanem (born 1964) is a Lebanese journalist and television presenter known for political and current-affairs broadcasting. He is particularly associated with the Lebanese television programs Kalam el-Nass, which he presented on LBCI from 1995 to 2018, and Sar El Wa2et, which he began presenting on MTV Lebanon in 2018.

Ghanem studied law at the Lebanese University and practiced as an attorney before entering broadcasting. His career has included live political interviews, current-affairs programming, election coverage, public-policy discussions, audience participation and humanitarian fundraising broadcasts. In 2017, the Lebanese American University awarded him an honorary doctorate in Humane Letters.

== Early life and education ==
Ghanem was born in Lebanon in 1964. He studied law at the Lebanese University and obtained a Bachelor of Law. The Lebanese American University states that he practiced as an attorney for approximately ten years before moving into broadcasting.

His legal background later became part of the way his television work was presented publicly, particularly in discussions involving legislation, government policy and political affairs. Accounts of his early years also describe a period in which he combined his studies with tutoring and other work before establishing himself in the media.

== From Law to Journalism ==
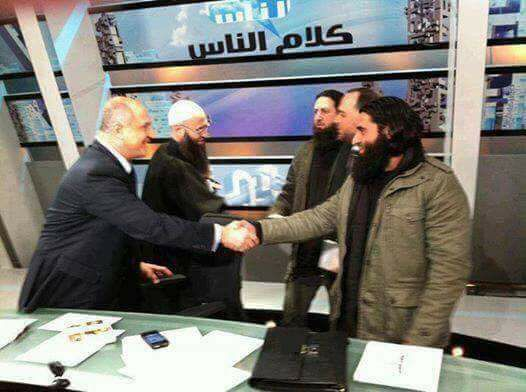
Marcel Ghanem (left) hosting Ahmed al-Assir in his political talk show Kalam El-Nas

Ghanem entered journalism through radio. He joined Radio Liban Libre, where he initially worked as a speaker before moving into the news and editorial departments. He later served as an editorial secretary and presented programs in different formats.

His early television work included Kalam Massoul, which he co-presented with journalist May Chidiac. This period established the combination of live interviewing, political discussion and direct questioning that would become central to his later career.

Ghanem has described his years at Radio Liban Libre as formative. In a 2018 profile, he recalled that the radio environment taught him how to handle information and helped him develop as a broadcaster and overcome his earlier shyness. His brother, journalist Georges Ghanem, was also part of his early professional environment.

== Early television career ==
In 1995, Ghanem became the presenter of Kalam el-Nass on LBCI. The program developed into a long-running political talk show and established him as a prominent television interviewer. Its coverage extended beyond political personalities to economic, social and public-policy questions, including issues such as water resources, food safety and waste management.

The program also included humanitarian broadcasts. Ghanem later identified episodes concerning families of people missing in Syria and children receiving cancer treatment among the most significant and memorable parts of his television career.

After more than two decades at LBCI, Ghanem left the broadcaster in 2018 and moved to MTV Lebanon. The move marked a new phase in his career and led to the launch of Sar El Wa2et.

== Sar El Wa2et on MTV Lebanon ==
In 2018, Ghanem joined MTV Lebanon as the host of Sar El Wa2et (Arabic: الوقت صار; English: It's About Time). MTV describes the program as a weekly political talk show dealing with current developments and political topics in Lebanon and around the world.

The program retained the live interview format associated with Ghanem while expanding the range of people participating in the discussion. Its broadcasts have brought together ministers, members of parliament, political representatives, journalists, specialists, academics, activists and members of the public.

A defining feature of Sar El Wa2et has been its effort to connect political discussion with the experiences and questions of people outside the political establishment. Studio audiences and public participants have been incorporated into discussions, allowing political guests to respond directly to questions and concerns raised by viewers and citizens.

=== Evolution of the format ===
Over successive seasons, Sar El Wa2et has developed beyond a conventional political interview program. Its coverage has included political and economic developments, social questions, public services, national events and humanitarian causes. The program has also experimented with different forms of audience interaction and digital participation as television and social media have become increasingly connected.

The ninth season, airing in 2026, continues the program's political-talk format while incorporating newer forms of audience and digital interaction. Elements such as live voting, audience feedback and technology-assisted analysis have been introduced into the program's evolving television format.

=== Youth participation and public discussion ===
An important part of Sar El Wa2et's development was its youth-participation initiative, including a collaboration documented by the National Democratic Institute. Young Lebanese participants received preparation in policy discussion and debate and were given opportunities to engage directly with political leaders on television.

The initiative involved large numbers of young participants and was adapted during the COVID-19 pandemic so that young people could continue participating remotely. The youth-debate component was a distinct phase of the program's development and is not presented here as a permanent feature of every current episode.

=== MTV Academy and opportunities for young people ===
The broader youth-oriented work associated with Sar El Wa2et has also included collaboration with MTV Academy. The initiative provides students with exposure to television, media and digital-content production, with areas including television presenting, communication, content creation, social media and digital media.

The academy model extends the program's relationship with young people beyond the television studio by connecting participants with practical media experience and professionals working in broadcasting. The wider Sar El Wa2et production environment has likewise provided opportunities for participants to gain experience in television and digital media.

=== Humanitarian broadcasts and fundraising ===
Humanitarian television has remained a recurring part of Ghanem's work. Sar El Wa2et has been used on several occasions as a platform for fundraising campaigns supporting medical and social causes.

In December 2022, an extended Sar El Wa2et broadcast in partnership with the American University of Beirut raised more than US$5 million for cancer patients. AUB credited Ghanem, MTV and the wider team for their contribution to the campaign.

In December 2023, the Children's Cancer Center of Lebanon organized a live telethon with Ghanem as part of Sar El Wa2et. The center described the broadcast as an appeal for public support during a major financial deficit.

MTV also aired a Sar El Wa2et telethon supporting the Sisters of the Cross Association in 2025. These broadcasts illustrate a recurring part of the program's identity alongside its regular political coverage.

== Notable interviews and television moments ==
Ghanem's television career has included interviews with Lebanese political leaders, public officials, journalists, artists and representatives of civil society. His interviews have often combined direct political questioning with broader discussion of social and economic issues.

One of the long-standing political relationships described by Ghanem was his friendship with former Lebanese prime minister Rafic Hariri. In a 2007 interview, Ghanem recalled Hariri as one of the political friends he had lost and described an occasion on which he had questioned Hariri particularly firmly during a live program. Ghanem said that Hariri later remarked that someone with friends like Ghanem did not need enemies, which Ghanem cited as an example of his ability to separate personal relationships from professional journalism. He also recalled that their relationship had temporarily been interrupted before being restored through the intervention of former minister Bahij Tabbarah.

Other notable television appearances have included political interviews with figures such as Saad Hariri and discussions involving major Lebanese political and public issues. In 2018, Saad Hariri appeared on Ghanem's program Sar el Wa2et on MTV Lebanon for a discussion of political and institutional matters.

Ghanem has also expressed interest in interviewing figures outside conventional political circles. In a 2018 profile, he named Pope Francis, Fairuz and the Dalai Lama among people he hoped to interview. This reflects the broader range of public personalities he has sought to bring into the world of television conversation.

== Approach to journalism and relationship with audiences ==
Ghanem has described his approach to television as based on direct questioning, credibility and a distinction between professional journalism and personal relationships. In a 2007 interview, he said that he could separate his professional work from his personal relationships with political figures and emphasized the importance of asking the questions he believed needed to be asked.

He has also spoken about the importance of avoiding sectarian alignment in media and of presenting different Lebanese political viewpoints. In interviews, he has described the relationship between a television presenter and the public as interactive, with audiences influencing the development of a program as much as the presenter influences the conversation.

The human side of journalism has been another recurring theme in his public comments. He has singled out humanitarian programs as among the most meaningful broadcasts of his career and has expressed an interest in journalism that moves beyond the studio to document the lives and difficulties of ordinary people.

In a 2018 interview with Forbes Middle East, Ghanem described the affection of the public as one of the highlights of his career and said that his broader goal was to help people achieve a better future. Such statements provide context for the combination of political discussion, audience participation and humanitarian broadcasting that has characterized his later work.

== Professional continuity and television teams ==
Continuity in the people working around Ghanem has been a recurring feature of his television career. Some members of his wider production environment continued working with him when he moved from LBCI to MTV, while the launch and development of Sar El Wa2et brought additional journalists, producers, digital-media contributors and audience-coordination staff into the program.

The program has also provided a pathway for younger participants to gain practical experience in television and digital media. This continuity between established professionals and newer participants has become part of the production environment surrounding Sar El Wa2et.

== Other television work ==
In addition to Sar El Wa2et, Ghanem has participated in MTV Lebanon's coverage of major national television events. His work has included special programming connected with the 2018 Lebanese parliamentary elections and the Miss Lebanon 2018 competition.

Marcel Ghanem at Miss Lebanon 2018

His broader television career has included election-night coverage, political and economic specials, current-affairs programs and broadcasts devoted to major national developments.

== Other professional activities ==
In 2013, Société Générale de Banque au Liban (SGBL) appointed Ghanem as an ambassador for a two-year period. Contemporary reporting stated that his role included participation in the bank's cultural and social activities and initiatives related to economic and social development.

== Awards and honors ==
Ghanem has received professional distinctions and institutional recognition during his broadcasting career.

· 2005 – Murex d'Or, Best Journalist.

· 2017 – Honorary Doctorate in Humane Letters, Lebanese American University. LAU awarded Ghanem an honorary doctorate during its 2017 commencement ceremonies and described him as an award-winning journalist with more than 25 years of experience in political talk shows.

· 2021 – Khalaf Ahmad Al Habtoor Achievement Award. Ghanem was among the Arab media figures honored with the award in 2021 for distinguished achievement in the media sector.

== Personal life ==
Ghanem has generally kept his private life relatively separate from his television career, while occasionally speaking publicly about his family, friends and personal interests.

He is the brother of Lebanese journalist and broadcaster Georges Ghanem, who was also part of his early professional environment. His wider family has included media professionals, and he has maintained close relationships with relatives, friends and colleagues.

His mother, Saydeh Maroun Aouad, died in November 2019. Following her death, Ghanem publicly paid tribute to her, describing her as his “guardian angel” and the “queen crowned on my heart.”

People who have known or worked with Ghanem have at times described him in warm and affectionate terms. Personal accounts have referred to his having a “child's heart,” a phrase used to describe his warmth, spontaneity and attachment to the people around him. These descriptions are best understood as attributed personal characterizations rather than objective assessments.

Ghanem has also spoken publicly about travel and his appreciation of Lebanese food and culture.

== Public life ==
Across more than three decades in broadcasting, Ghanem's public profile has been shaped primarily by live television and his direct relationship with audiences. His work has moved between political interviews, public-policy discussion, youth participation, digital interaction and humanitarian broadcasting.

MTV's current archive places Sar El Wa2et in its ninth season in 2026, with hundreds of episodes listed since its first broadcast in August 2018. The continuity of the program, together with its changing formats and subjects, represents the latest phase of Ghanem's long-running television career.
