= Jad Demian =

Lebanese politician

Jad Demian is a Lebanese politician who is the head of the Lebanese Forces Youth Association.
