= Ghassan Shabaneh =

Ghassan Shabaneh (Arabic: غسان شبانة) was an associate professor of Middle East and international studies at Marymount Manhattan College in New York City. He held a B.A. from William Paterson State University, a master's degree in international relations from Rutgers, the State University of New Jersey. and a Ph.D. in international relations from the Graduate Center of the City University of New York. He taught and lectured at Rutgers, Hunter, and Queens Colleges in the last few years. He appeared on many Arab TV stations especially on Al-Arabiya and on Al Jazeera.
