= Jacqueline Massabki =

Lebanese writer and lawyer

File:Jacqueline Massabki
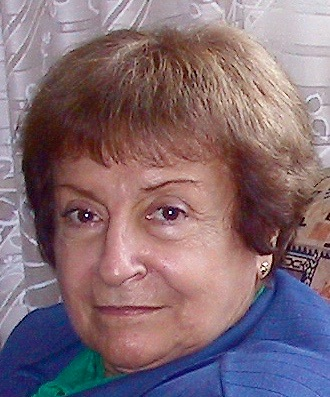
- Born: Beirut, Lebanon
- Died: 1 September 2015; Beirut, Lebanon
- Burial place: Ras el-Nabeh cemetery
- Occupations: Writer and lawyer
- Spouse: Antoine Boulos Abi Ghosn

Jacqueline Massabki was a Lebanese writer and lawyer born in Beirut, Lebanon. She died there on 1 September 2015.

== Life and work ==
Jacqueline Massabki was by turns a lawyer and a journalist. She worked as a municipal employee while she studied law at the university. After graduation, she did an internship with Henri Jalkh and Roger Najjar. She married Antoine Boulos Abi Ghosn.

=== Advocate ===
She was inspired to become an advocate as a young girl, according to an interview she gave to Henoud.

I only dreamed of one thing, to do this job. When I was 12 years old, I had seen a movie with Daniele Darrieux, she was wearing the [court robes]. Maybe that's it, I don't know!

Massabki specialized in banking and commercial law.

In 1965, she ran for election to the council of the Lebanese Bar Association and was the first woman to compete with her male colleagues and win. There she felt she could "finally give voice to a woman, to give her place and a role in this profession where they were still very rare to whisper their claims." She went on to win a second time but declined a third try.

She was a member of the International Federation of Women Lawyers and, as such, she represented Lebanon around the world. Her speaking engagements took her to China, the United States, Africa, India, Russia and Germany.

=== Writer ===
In an interview, Massabki said, "I always wanted to be a writer; besides, I did journalism for a long time in my youth."

Her best known work is the novel La Mémoire des cèdres (The memory of the cedars), co-written with François Porel, and published in October 1989. She wrote the novel over ten years during the Lebanese civil war (1975-1990) when she was among the massive exodus of almost one million people from her homeland.

=== Later years ===
Affected by Alzheimer's disease since 2006, Massabki died in 2015 in Beirut, where she is buried in the Ras el-Nabeh cemetery.

In the book by Swiss author Gilberte Favre, La Langue des dieux, the author pays tribute to Massabki.

== Awards ==
Massabki's novel, published in October 1989, by Robert Laffont, earned many awards in 1990 including:

- the prize of the Houses of the Press,
- the prize of the newspaper La Vie,
- the RTL-Lire Grand Prize.
