= George El Andary =

Lebanese researcher

Dr. Sheikh George El Andary
- الدكتور الشيـخ جورج العنداري
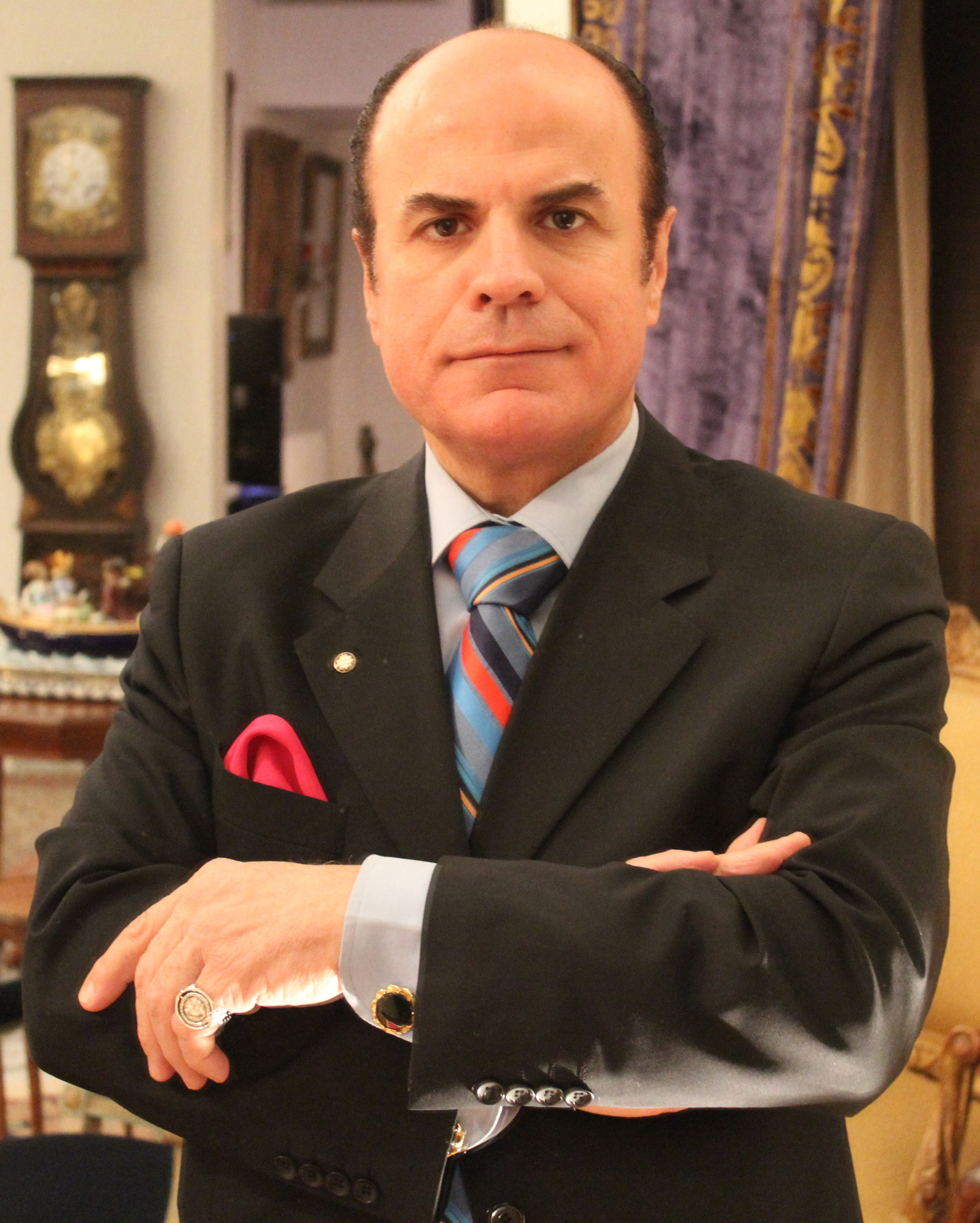
- El Andary in 2012

Personal details
- Born: 1958 (age 67–68) Kfour Al Arbe, Batroun District, North Lebanon
- Children: 3
- Education: University of Johannesburg
- Occupation: Researcher

Dr. Sheikh George El Andary (Arabic: الدكتور الشيـخ جورج العنداري; born 1958) is a Lebanese researcher in archaeology, museums and manuscripts. He is the son of sheikh Nematallah El Andary, the grandson of sheikh Isaac bin sheikh Elias El Andary.

== Personal life ==
He was born in 1958 in the village of Kfour Al Arbe, Batroun District, North Lebanon. From a young age he gained interest in collecting rare and unique old royal artistic masterpieces, old writings and papers, unique and valuable documents and manuscripts and many archaeological and special items and then maintaining them. He inherited this passion from both his grandfathers.

He is married to the honorable Mrs. Yvette Madi El Andary and together have three sons.

== Early life and education ==
Dr. El Andary continued his studies at the University of Johannesburg, South Africa where he obtained a master's degree and then in 1984 a PhD in archaeology from his article entitled: The role of the archaeological documents in revealing the civilizations through the history. He also obtained a bachelor's degree in museum sciences from the same university. He worked as a researcher in the Archaeological Researches Center at the university between 1984 and 1985.

== Professional career ==
In 1984 he established the International Transaction System in Johannesburg, and then in Lebanon and abroad. This became an international institution dealing with restoration of archaeological sites, museum equipment and trade of rare, unique and authentic royal artistic masterpieces for museums and archaeological enterprises.

For five years he worked as an expert and museum consultant with the National Museum of Pretoria and the Durban Museum (South Africa). Later, he worked with the delegates and representatives of other international museums including the Metropolitan Museum of Art (New York), Luxembourg National Museum and the Museum of Islamic Art (Berlin).

During his international travels of visiting various museums and universal antiques auctions such as Sotheby's, Christie's and others, Dr. El Andary was able to collect precious, rare and authentic royal masterpieces and belongings of famous personalities including King Louis XIV, Napoleon Bonaparte, Napoleon III, King George III, King George V, Empress Maria Theresa, King Abdulaziz Al-Saud, Adolf Hitler, Grand Admiral Kilic Ali Pasha, shah Abbas I Al Safavid, Sultan Suleiman Al Qanuni, Ottoman Sultans, Princes, Sheikhs of tribes in the Arabian Peninsula, the Prophet, Saints, Patriarchs, Bishops, Gentlefolk, painters, authors, philosophers, scientists and others.

Dr El Andary collected rare and authentic gold coins from Mecca and Constantinople, as well as ancient weapons dating back to 1650. He also compiled a collection of eighteenth and nineteenth century Porcelain de Sèvres that had been manufactured for emperors, kings and dignitaries.

Dr El Andary also collected oil paintings from famous European and other painters in the seventeenth, eighteenth and nineteenth centuries.

Over 35 years, Dr El Andary has collected a number of authentic historical documents deemed important, and rare ancient manuscripts, some of which are a thousand years old.

== Awards and honors ==
Dr. Sheikh George El Andary joined the International Group of Archaeology & Museums experts (I.G.A.M) in New York in 1990. Citing "the international importance of his unique artistic and historical collection", the I.G.A.M ranked him in the third place among international collectors in its annual book issued in October 1991. He obtained this classification because "he owns the most important collection of genuine historical documents and rare ancient manuscripts in the world reaching today to eight thousand manuscripts in thirty-nine languages, which some are exhibited in the museums worldwide".

He was awarded several medals from presidents, ministries, universities and foundations for his researches and special studies in showing some of the ancient cultures through the remaining historical manuscripts; he also honored in his turn many international high-standard personalities, famous in various societies.

Dr. El Andary's work improved academic publicity of West Asian countries through hundreds of interviews and audiovisual and written cultural media sessions. These sessions were held by the Arabic and international media, local and global, for more than thirty five years of his continuous contribution to archaeology and museum sciences. These contributions include the manuscripts and historical document's sciences, and how to maintain the international legacy, under his direction (and through the mass media) for the international audiences, spectators and readers to connect the youth to the ancient civilizations.
