= Hassan Khachfe =

Lebanese scientist

Hassan Khachfe (born October 19, 1970) is a Lebanese innovator, researcher and professor. He is an academic manager at the Lebanese International University.

== Early life ==
Khachfe was born to Lebanese parents from the southern part of the country. He started his college studies in the Physics program at the American University of Beirut, and later continued his formal education in the United States, where he earned a M.Sc. in Polymer Chemistry from Wichita State University and a Ph.D. in Biophysics and Molecular Medicine from Boston University School of Medicine

== Career ==
Khachfe started his career as a research fellow at Northeastern University and also at the Center for Advanced Biomedical Research in Boston. He started his teaching career at the American University of Beirut, and later became the head of the Bioinformatics and Structural Biology Unit. He then joined the Lebanese International University and became Academic Director at its Nabatieh campus. He is a national (Lebanese Ministry of Education and Higher Education) and international (Association of Arab Universities) accredited auditor of higher education programs.

Khachfe runs multidisciplinary research projects and supervises several interdisciplinary research groups such as the Lebanese Institute for Biomedical Research and Application (LIBRA).
