= Savoir Flair =

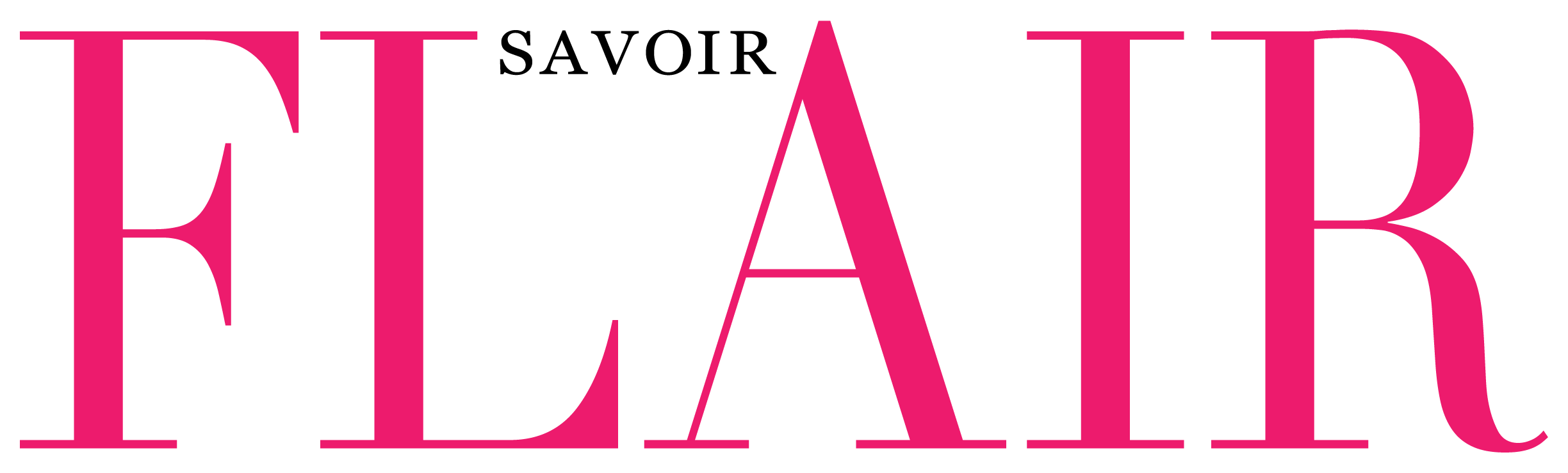
- Editor: Haleh Nia
- Frequency: Daily
- Founder: Haleh Nia
- Founded: 2009
- Country: United Arab Emirates
- Language: Arabic, English
- Website: https://www.savoirflair.com/

Savoir Flair is a digital women’s fashion, beauty, and culture magazine based in Dubai, UAE, founded in June 2009 by Haleh Nia, who is the magazine’s current publisher and editor-in-chief. Savoir Flair focuses on fashion in The Middle East.

== History ==
When Haleh Nia launched Savoir Flair at the age of 24, she was, at the time, the youngest publisher and editor-in-chief in the Middle East.

Savoir Flair launched a new version of its website in October 2015. In May 2016, Savoir Flair launched an Arabic-language sister website, Savoir Flair Al Arabiya, with a photo-shoot and interview with Arab singing sensation Nancy Ajram. In early 2017, Savoir Flair and Savoir Flair Al Arabiya were incorporated under the publishing media company and creative agency Halo Media umbrella.

In June 2019, the magazine announced the launch of a coffee-table book in celebration of its tenth anniversary. The book, titled SFX, will be published by Assouline and released globally in late 2020.

== Publications ==
- Savoir Flair - SFX: The little magazine that could (and did), ed. Assouline. December 2020.
