= Maya Nassar =

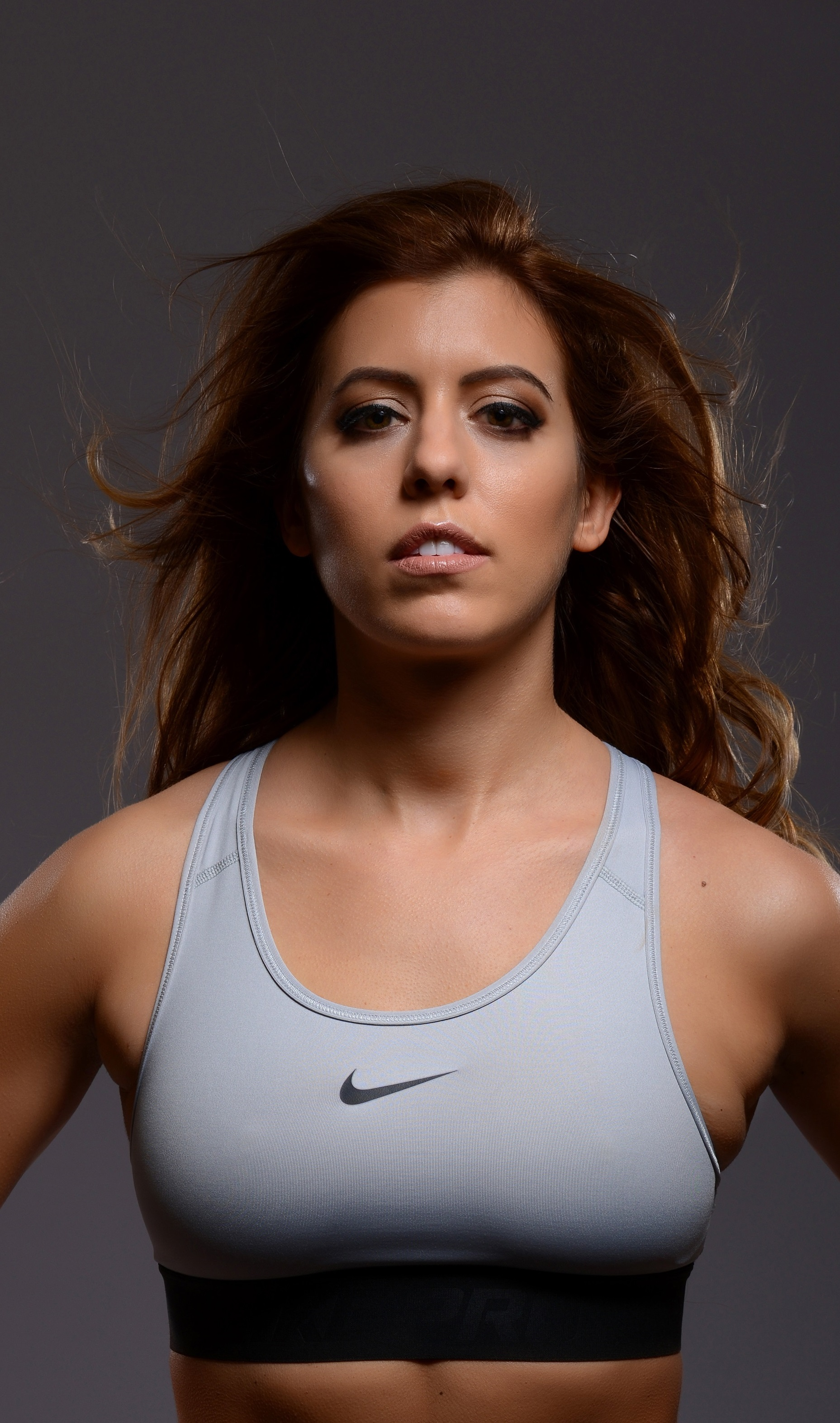
- Born: October 3, 1986 (age 39)
- Occupation: Sports Nutritionist
- Website: startlivingright.net

Maya Nassar (born October 3, 1986) is a Dutch-Lebanese competitive fitness model, entrepreneur, and radio host. She gained recognition as Ms. Fitness Universe 2025 in Las Vegas and has a background in various fitness competitions, including winning first place at the 2014 Pure Elite UK Championships.

== Early life ==
Maya Nassar was born in Long Island, New York to a Lebanese father and a Dutch mother. She grew up in Nigeria, and spent several years in England before moving to Lebanon for high school, where she has lived since.

== Career ==
Nassar began her fitness journey in 2010, following a training program and diet regimen that resulted in a significant weight loss. She first competed in the Miami Pro European Championships in 2013 and returned to the competitive scene in 2014, becoming the first Lebanese athlete endorsed by the Lebanese government to participate in a bodybuilding event outside of Lebanon. In addition to her competitive achievements, Nassar has built a substantial online presence through her blog, “Start Living Right,” which focuses on fitness and wellness. This platform led to the development of the Start Living Right fitness application, which has been endorsed by the Lebanese Ministry of Youth and Sports and has achieved high rankings on the Apple Store. Nassar is also a certified personal trainer and sports nutritionist. She opened a physical location for Start Living Right in 2017 in Antelias, Lebanon, which offers various fitness services, including personal training and nutrition counseling. The gym is notable for being sponsored by Nike and providing Nike Training Club classes.

== Workshops and speaking engagements ==
Nassar conducts workshops and talks focused on health, nutrition, and fitness. She has spoken at various events, including conferences and initiatives aimed at women’s empowerment and health awareness.
