= Georges Chakra =

Lebanese fashion designer

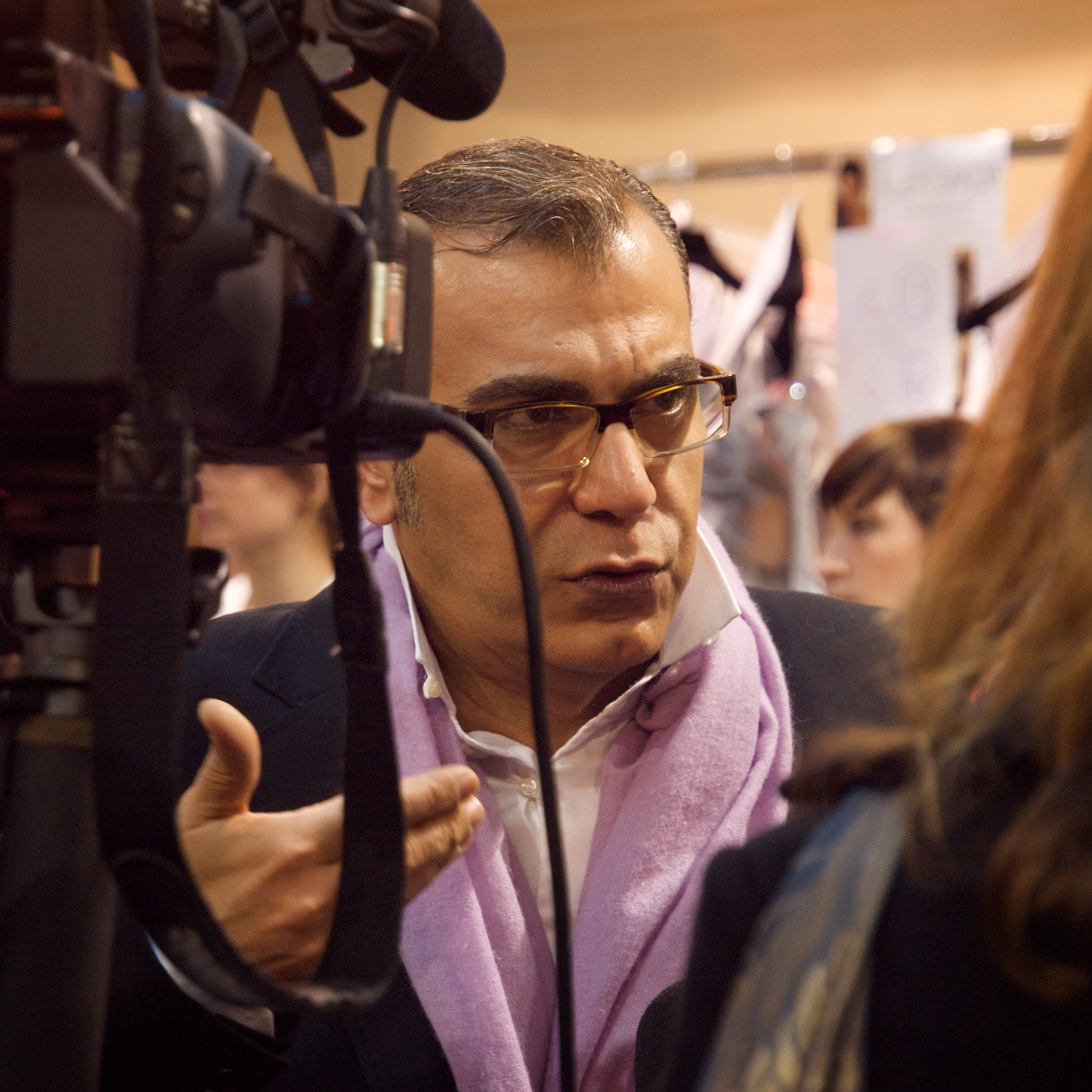
- Industry: Fashion
- Founded: 1985
- Headquarters: Beirut, Lebanon
- Key people: Georges Chakra (Creative Director)
- Website: www.georgeschakra.com

Georges Chakra (Arabic: جورج شقرا) is a Beirut-based Lebanese haute couture fashion designer. Chakra founded his eponymous brand in 1985 and has been showcasing his collections at Paris Fashion Week since the mid-1990s.

== Biography ==
In 1985, he returned to Lebanon and opened his first store.

His breakthrough came in 2006 when his designs were featured in the film The Devil Wears Prada, after 20 years in the industry. This exposure helped propel his brand to international recognition, transforming it into a global haute couture fashion house. Over the years, he has dressed numerous high-profile celebrities, including Rihanna, Beyoncé, Tyra Banks, Jennifer Lopez, and Helen Mirren.

== TV and film ==
Aside from his creations appearing in the 2006 film The Devil Wears Prada, featuring Meryl Streep, Georges Chakra's designs have also been prominently featured in the television series Gossip Girl, worn by stars Blake Lively and Leighton Meester.

== Notable clients ==
- Gwen Stefani
- Hiba Tawaji - Cannes Film Festival 2017
- Goldie Hawn
- Catherine-Zeta Jones
- Rebecca Romijn
- Sophie Marceau
- Dakota Fanning
- Julia Louis-Dreyfus
- Juliette Lewis
- Kristen Bell
- Hilary Duff
- Jane Fonda
- Kelly Osborne
- Sheryl Crow
- Queen Latifah
