= Talal El Merhebi =

Lebanese politician (born 1946)

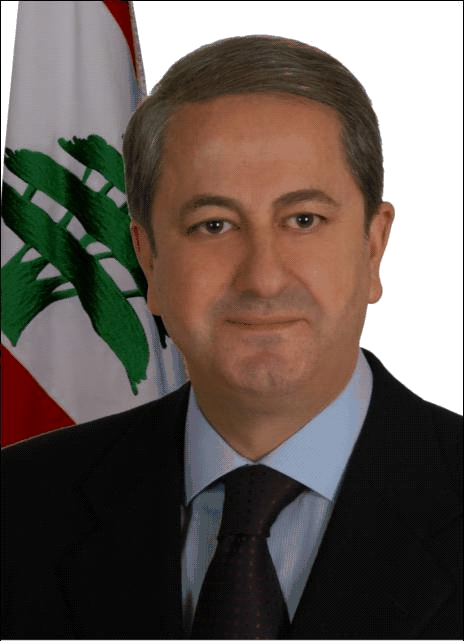
Talal El Merhebi

Talal El Merhebi (Arabic: طلال المرعبي), born in late 1946, is the son of Khaled Beik Abdulkader El Merhebi, politician and leader in the North Lebanon district of Akkar (Deputy of Akkar since 1934). Khaled Beik had eight children, six daughters and two sons, Khaldoun and Talal.

== Education ==
El Merhebi started school at "Les Frères" in Tripoli, then moved to "Les Appotres" Jounieh as a boarding school. He continued his education at Saint Joseph University (Yessouiyye) (USJ) Beirut and finished his law degree at Arab University.

Highly active in student affairs, he was elected President of North Lebanon Students in Tripoli. In 1970, he founded The Akkar youth club that held educational, social, health-related, and sports events. He was also one of the founders of the North Lebanese students association in Beirut that regrouped many northern students in Beirut.

== Political career ==
Talal, referred to as the Beik by tradition and leadership since he presented himself in the 1972 elections and was elected, or His Excellency since he was appointed Minister twice (Minister of Public Health in 1979 and Minister of the National Economy later that same year).

At that time, The Second bureau (el maktab el thani) which was created by Fouad Chehab and some high-ranking military officers was on his downfall. The president Sleiman Beik Frangie was Khaled Beik's friend and neighbor, he proposed to Talal to present for the elections with Mikhael El Daher, Dr Abdallah El Rassi and Sleiman Beik El Ali El Merhebi who was a relative because at that time in Akkar it was only the Merhebis who ran elections for the Sunnis in Akkar. The Merhebi family is the biggest family in Lebanon, with almost 20,000 members of the family living mainly in Akkar, Tripoli, and some in Beirut.

While the others failed, Sleiman Beik El Ali El Merhebi's list (named the "Popular List" (Al Laiha al chabiya)) was elected entirely and Talal Beik received many votes, especially from women who considered him "a young, educated leader".

Talal entered the parliament in April 1972 and was the youngest deputy in the parliament. He was elected Secretary of the Parliament with Amine Jumayyel as President of the Republic and Kamal El Assaad as prime minister. Later that same year, he was appointed member of the Financial Committee and Decider in the Public Affairs Committee.

Being a lawyer himself, the Beik presented many proposals for laws and regulations and participated in getting them executed, most of them were related to student affairs, student and workers rights and betterment of the governmental employees’ situation. As a new entrant to the Lebanese political world, Talal consistently requested a change in the system and tried as much as possible to contain the corruption.

Akkar was an impoverished region ripe for improvement, Talal Beik presented and executed many projects in order to develop the region like new roads construction, water facilities, telephone centers, power plants projects and many governmental hospitals and schools.

In 1973 Talal was nominated as Minister, but wasn't chosen due to his age.

The spark that ignited the war occurred in Beirut on April 13, 1975, when gunmen killed four Phalangists (Kataeb) during an attempt on Pierre Jumayyil's life. Perhaps believing the assassins to have been Palestinian, the Phalangists retaliated later that day by attacking a bus carrying Palestinian passengers across a Christian neighborhood, killing about twenty-six of the occupants. The next day fighting erupted in earnest, with Phalangists pitted against Palestinian militiamen (thought by some observers to be from the Popular Front for the Liberation of Palestine). The confessional layout of Beirut's various quarters facilitated random killing. Most residents of Beirut stayed inside their homes during these early days of battle, and few imagined that the street fighting they were witnessing was the beginning of a war that was to devastate their city and divide the country.

The government could not act effectively because leaders were unable to agree on whether or not to use the army to stop the bloodletting. When Jumblatt and his leftist supporters tried to isolate the Phalangists politically, other Christian sects rallied to Jumayyil's camp, creating a further rift. Consequently, in May 1975 Prime Minister Rashid as Sulh and his cabinet resigned, and a new government was formed under Rashid Karami. Although there were many calls for his resignation, President Frangiye steadfastly retained his office.

Syria, which was deeply concerned about the flow of events in Lebanon, also proved powerless to enforce calm through diplomatic means. And, most ominous of all, the Lebanese Army, which generally had stayed out of the strife, began to show signs of factionalizing and threatened to bring its heavy weaponry to bear on the conflict.

In light of the recent events, Talal Beik created the National Opposition party "Jabhat el mouwajaha el wataniyya" which held members from all religions in order to insist on keeping the national unity among the Lebanese since Talal was a strong believer in an independent, united Lebanon. This party had political power and Military power that was only used for the protection of civil property and citizens of Akkar. Talal defended the Lebanese Independence against the division conspiracy that many foreign countries tried to impose at that time.

In 1976, The Riyadh Conference, followed by an Arab League meeting in Cairo also in October 1976, formally ended the Lebanese Civil War; although the underlying causes were in no way eliminated, the full-scale warfare stopped. Syria's presence in Lebanon was legitimized by the establishment of the Arab Deterrent Force (ADF) by the Arab League in October 1976.

Talal Beik was against the intervention of the Palestinians in Lebanese affairs and disagreed with Palestinian figures on many issues, consequently he was forced to hide in Akkar the North of Lebanon for a while. He worked hard with national figures to stop the war and allowing the entering of Deterrent Force and attended the meetings in Damas and Riad in 1976.

In 1979, he was appointed Minister of National Economy and Minister of Public Health under Prime Minister Salim El Hoss's government which was a small government with only 14 ministers. He had great success in both ministries and was very close to President Elias Sarkis.

As a Minister of Public Health, the major event was the improvement of the Operations Center for the implementation of the Open-heart operations at the American University hospital: For the First time in Lebanon, the ministry, under his excellency's order (Talal Beik) could donate 6 million Lebanese pounds to every open-heart operation patient since the costs were reduced and patients wouldn't have to travel abroad to operate themselves. As a minister of the national economy, he worked on boosting the economy by creating strong ties and good collaboration with the Chamber of Commerce and Industry.

Later that year, there had been disagreements with some of the Syrian leaders and he was forced to leave the country for Paris where he stayed for around two years.

With Bachir El Jumayyel elected as president El-Merhebi was back to help bringing back the legitimacy of the government. Talal and many other figures were working on keeping their neutral position after president Jumayyel's assassination and the country was divided again.

In 1989, he went with other deputies to the Taef agreement in the Kingdom of Saudi Arabia, and was elected member of the new constitution writing committee. He worked very hard with President Hussein Al Housseiny and the other 16 members in order to reach the necessary constitutional modifications that had to be made in a political context blessed by Saudi Arabia, Arab countries, the United States, and the East.

Talal insisted on returning to Lebanon after the Taif agreement and refused to go elsewhere regardless of all the threats he received; he lived with his family.

May 6, 1992 was a disaster, known as "6 ayyar", when the government resigned.

Talal Beik was afterward nominated as Prime Minister and after President Elias El Hraoui informed him of approval, a last-minute Syrian intervention took place and stopped him from being appointed.

While in Taif, Talal was introduced to the President Rafik El Hariri through president Rene Mouawad. Talal El Merhebi was an active member in the Islamic reunion with the Mufti Cheikh Hassan Khaled and worked with president Hariri after being elected Prime minister on the approval of the Solidere project.

All throughout the years Talal El Merhebi continued his work and was a friend and loved by everyone, due to his kind, helpful, and supporting personality. According to Talal corruption was unjustified and he tried his best to fight corruption in the political class and that was one of his most important priorities, that's why he didn't abuse his power to make money while others were. It's true he came from a wealthy family, but he was a supporter of an anti-corruption cause.

He presented to the 1992 elections in the North of Lebanon and was elected. In 1996 he was reelected and received the highest number of votes between competitors.

After the elections he created the Independent National party (Al takattol el watani el moustakill) with a group of deputies and ministers like Minister Sleiman Frangie, Minister Talal Erslan, Cheikh El Khazen and many others. He presented many proposals for laws and regulation for the betterment of the society with some of his colleagues like Botross Harb, Khatshik Babikian and Mohamad Beydoun.

He presided the parliamentary emigrants committee as well as both the Lebanese-Italian and the Lebanese-Japanese friendship committees.

In the year 2000, he presented to the elections with the same allies but the Syrian officers worked their best on failing him using all sort of methods, like threatening and imprisoning his supporters, and with all that the difference was minimal. Talal El Merhebi kept his place as a leader in the region and he still is exercising his political life due to the strong ties he had made with a lot of the government officials and is known to be a man of Justice, Equality and fairness.

On October 14, 2012, The Lebanese Decision movement was launched by Talal El-Merhebi, the launching ceremony is symbolic and one of a kind; priests and Muslim sheikhs were seated next to each other in the ceremony and the public unity is cited as one of the main objectives of the movement. Also strong emphasis was made regarding the women's role in the society, "she is there to lead instead of be led".
