= Nazek Abu Alwan Abed =

Lebanese educator and writer (1937–2022)

Nazek Abou Alwan Abed
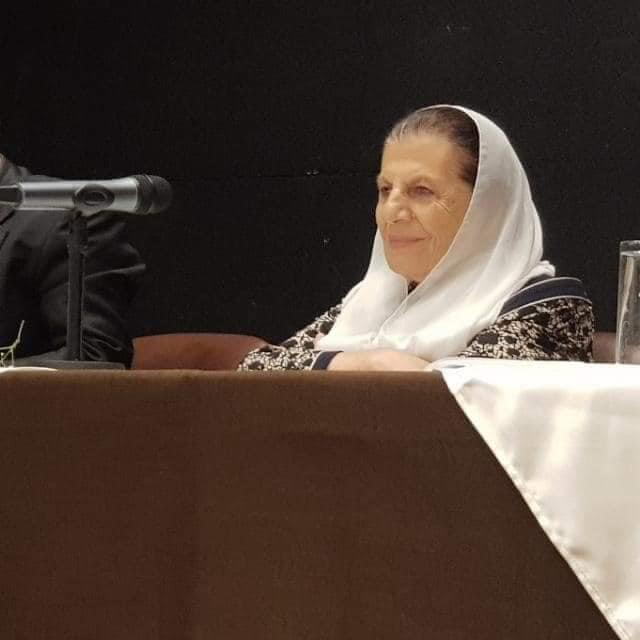
- Born: March 8, 1937; Barouk, Chouf District, Mount Lebanon
- Died: March 24, 2022 (aged 85)
- Education: PhD in philosophy; Bachelor's degree in philosophy and sociology
- Occupations: Educator; Writer
- Spouse: Fawzi Abed
- Children: 5

Nazek Abou Alwan Abed (Arabic: نازك ابو علوان عابد, March 8, 1937 – March 24, 2022) was a Lebanese educator, lecturer, and writer of journalistic and philosophical articles and books. She was born in Barouk into a Lebanese family and was best known for her books about enlightenment, humanity, ethics and society. Abed believed in a life of purpose, where peace and harmony should prevail over, and where a person's relationships are at the essence of their success and happiness. Nazek Abed was a living icon of "Leading by Example" whether in her professional or personal life. She was known for her great deal of wisdom and as a reference within her community.

She believed in the philosophies of Kamal Jumblatt, whom she wrote her doctorate dissertation on.

== Early education and career ==
Nazek Abou Alwan Abed was born to a prominent family in Barouk village, mount Lebanon, where she spent her childhood and studied at the village school, before the family moved to Beirut. There she enrolled at The Anjeleye AL Wataniya School from 1949 - 1956, afterwards earning a bachelor's degree from the Beirut College for Women in 1961, known today as Lebanese American University (LAU). Continuing her studies at the Beirut Arab University in Lebanon, she earned a bachelor's degree in philosophy and sociology in 1970, then in 2002 had earned her doctorate at Fairfax University, in the United States. She wrote her PhD dissertation on Kamal Jumblatt.

After her marriage to Fawzi Abed from the Shouf village of Moukhtara, she worked in the Lebanese Ministry of Urban Design and, after the latter was abolished, in the Lebanese Ministry of Housing. She was also a teacher at several schools in Lebanon. In 1987, Nazek and Fawzi co-founded West Hill College in Baakleen, Al Shouf, where Abed still councils, guides, and influences students and teachers alike (as of January, 2022).

== Kamal Jumblatt ==
Abed has always emphasized Kamal Jumblatt's impact not only on her life but on humanity as a whole. Her family lived next door to Jumblatt's residence (in Moukhtara). She has studied and written about his political, social and personal life. When Jumblatt was assassinated in March 1977, she was the first to arrive to the scene; she thoroughly writes about this experience in her book "The Walnut Tree".

== Published works ==
In addition to her published articles in many national and regional magazines, newspapers and newsletters ( اللواء, الأنباء ,الأنوار, البيرق), Abed has published five books so far, including the first biography of Kamal Jumblatt in English. Her first book was Shajarat al-jawz (Arabic: "شجرة الجوز"; The Teacher, The Leader), a translation of her doctoral thesis. Salawat Fi Haykal Alrouh (Arabic: صلوات في هيكل الروح; Prayers in the temple of the soul) is an inspiring book based on true stories, published in 2013. It contains reflections on the author's views of life and spirituality and her personal thoughts about Jumblatt. She has also published Al-mazar (Arabic: المزار) and Ayna Anti Ya Safaa (Arabic: أين أنت يا صفاء), a novel that discusses various social and cultural issues, and 365 Days with Kamal Jumblatt (Arabic: 365 يوما مع كمال جمبلاط).

== Honors and awards ==
- A ceremony in her honor was held by the municipality of Barouk on 17, 07, 2010 and attended by Hassan Mneimneh, the Minister of Higher Education, along with various social groups.
- "Lebanese Women Who Made A Difference" by USPEaK - TWE Chouf (March, 2022)
- A Medal of Appreciation on 30, 07, 2018 for her intellectual and spiritual contributions by "Sayyedat Liqa'a Al Mahabbah"
- A Medal of Appreciation and Progress on 15, 06, 2013 by The Association of Progressive Graduates
- LAU (Lebanese American University" 50th Graduation Anniversary in 2011
- The Kamal Jumblat Freedom Medal
- Diploma of Merit for her continuous support by the "Arab Physical Culture Federation" on 16, 09, 2012
- A Medal of Appreciation for her "Message of Love" by the Sami Makarem Cultural Center, Aytat on May 19, 2018.
