= Naji Shamil =

Actor from Lebanon

- Occupations: Actor, voice actor
- Father: Muhammad Shamil
- Family: Hassan Shamil (son)

Naji Muhammad Shamil (Arabic: ناجي شامل) is a Lebanese actor.

== Filmography ==
=== Plays ===
- Waylon Le Omma - Shaker. 2013
- I Reached to the 99. 2008

=== Dubbing roles ===
- 1001 Nights - Majid (first voice)
- Batman: The Animated Series - James Gordon (Lebanese dub)
- Mokhtarnameh - Khouly, Harmala ibn Kahel
- Prophet Joseph
- Samurai Jack (Classical Arabic version)
- The Looney Tunes Show - Yosemite Sam (Lebanese dub)
- The Powerpuff Girls - The Mayor of Townsville
- The Powerpuff Girls (2016 TV series) - The Mayor of Townsville
- Wabbbit - Yosemite Sam
- Xiaolin Showdown - Master Fung
