= Helou =

Helou, Hélou or Helu is a surname that means "sweet" or "pretty" in Arabic. Notable people with the surname include:

- Abdul Latif Helou (born 1971), Syrian footballer
- Anissa Helou (born 1952), British food writer of Lebanese/Syrian descent
- Carlos Slim Helu (born 1940), Mexican business magnate of Lebanese descent
- Charles Helou (1913–2001), President of Lebanon
- Henri Helou, Lebanese politician and Member of Parliament
- John Helou (died 1823), Lebanese religious leader
- Nina Helou (1904–1989), Lebanese lawyer and First Lady
