= Salima Abi Rashed =

Lebanese lawyer and journalist

- Born: 1887; Wadi Shahrur, Lebanon
- Died: 1919 (aged 31–32)
- Occupations: Lawyer, journalist

Salima Abi Rashed (1887–1919; Arabic: سليمة أبي راشد), was a Lebanese lawyer and journalist, considered the country's first female lawyer. She founded one of Lebanon's earliest women's magazines, Fatat Lobnan, in 1914.

== Biography ==
Salima Abi Rashed was born in 1887. Her family were Christians from the village of Wadi Shahrur in Lebanon's Baabda District.

Abi Rashed is considered the first woman to become a lawyer in Lebanon. She practiced in the courts of Baabda District. She is also considered a pioneer among Lebanese women journalists. In 1911, she was tasked with managing the newspaper al-Nasir, a daily political publication owned by her brother. Then, in 1914, she founded a monthly magazine called Fatat Lobnan, meaning "The Woman of Lebanon," in Beirut.

Considered one of the earliest women's magazines in the country, Fatat Lobnan covered both scientific and literary topics, and it advocated for an equal place for women in the workplace. "A woman is capable of following a man's suit in the majority of life's tasks," Abi Rashed, who edited the magazine, wrote in the debut issue. The magazine was part of an influential wave of women's publications across the region in this period. It was discontinued after an eight-month run due to the onset of World War I.

In her work, Abi Rashed also emphasized the importance of women's education, connecting women's liberation with the aim of bringing the nation into the modern era, and viewing women as key players in Lebanon's future. However, she and her contemporaries "sought not merely to imitate Western women but to define an autonomous, 'Eastern' vision of modern womanhood," the scholar Charlotte Weber writes.

While managing her publication in Lebanon, Abi Rashed also lived for a period in Egypt, where she worked as a teacher. She died in 1919, while she was only in her early thirties. After her death, she was memorialized in the publication Fatat al-Sharq as "an exemplar for women in gravity, pleasantness, well-considered opinions, and fine principles," an "excellent literary woman."
