= Afif Abdul Wahab =

Lebanese physician

Afif Abdul Wahab (1915–2003) was a Lebanese medical doctor, general surgeon and urologist, businessman and philanthropist, born and raised in El Mina. After receiving his Medical Doctorate from the American University of Beirut in 1941, he opened up a hospital in his hometown of El-Mina in 1946 in partnership with Joseph Yamine and Richard Jebara, for a short period before moving to Saudi Arabia in 1949. Again with Yamine and Jebara, Abdul Wahab opened up the first Arab-owned hospital in Jeddah, The Lebanese Hospital in Jeddah, and was one of the first medical doctors to live and work in Saudi Arabia. In 1953 Abdul Wahab received the Saudi Citizenship from King Saud Bin Abdul Aziz, In 1962 all three partners opened another hospital in the eastern province of Saudi Arabia, Ash-Sharq Hospital which was a medical contractor for ARAMCO.

Abdul Wahab, along with Yamine received the National Cedars Medal from Lebanese president Suleiman Frangieh, which is the highest honor given to a Lebanese citizen. He died in January 2003, aged 87.

== See also ==
- Kheireddine Abdul Wahab
