= Daniel Chidiac =

Australian writer

- Born: Melbourne, Australia
- Occupation: Writer
- Genre: Philosophy; Self help; Wellness

Website
- Official website

Daniel Chidiac (born 1987 in Melbourne, Australia) is an author known for his work in personal development, lifestyle, and motivational literature. His books, including Who Says You Can’t? You Do, The Modern Break-Up, and Stop Letting Everything Affect You, have been published internationally and translated into multiple languages.

== Career ==
Chidiac began publishing works in the personal development and self-improvement genres in the mid-2010s. His writing commonly addresses themes such as mindset, emotional resilience, personal relationships, and individual agency.

His 2012 book Who Says You Can’t? You Do was republished by Penguin Random House, giving the work wider international distribution and exposure. The book centers on the concept of personal responsibility and overcoming psychological and emotional barriers.

In addition to Who Says You Can’t? You Do, Chidiac has published several other titles focused on emotional resilience, personal relationships, and self-improvement, including The Modern Break-Up and Stop Letting Everything Affect You, which have appeared in multiple international editions.

Beyond publishing, Chidiac has worked as a coach and consultant for media and entertainment professionals, including contestants on Dancing with the Stars, radio show hosts, DJs, television presenters, and business figures. In July 2021, BBC Radio London hosted a talk show with Chidiac on the topic relationships and heartbreak. In 2025, he appeared as himself in two episodes of the American reality television series The Real Housewives of Miami.

== Publications ==
Chidiac’s bibliography includes both fiction and non-fiction works, often centered on themes of personal growth and mindset. His books have been released in various formats, including paperback, e-book, and audiobook editions. His books include:

- 2015 - Awaken Your Mind Open Your Heart - The Steps to Success, Wealth and Happiness ISBN 9781922175649, 1922175641
- 2018 - Who Says You Can't? You Do ISBN 9780525573616, 0525573615
- 2019 - The Modern Break-Up ISBN 0987166557, 9780987166555
- 2023 - Thoughts and Feelings - Volume One
- 2025 - Stop Letting Everything Affect You - How to Break Free from Overthinking, Emotional Chaos, and Self-Sabotage
