= Nabil F. Saba =

Atlanta oncologist

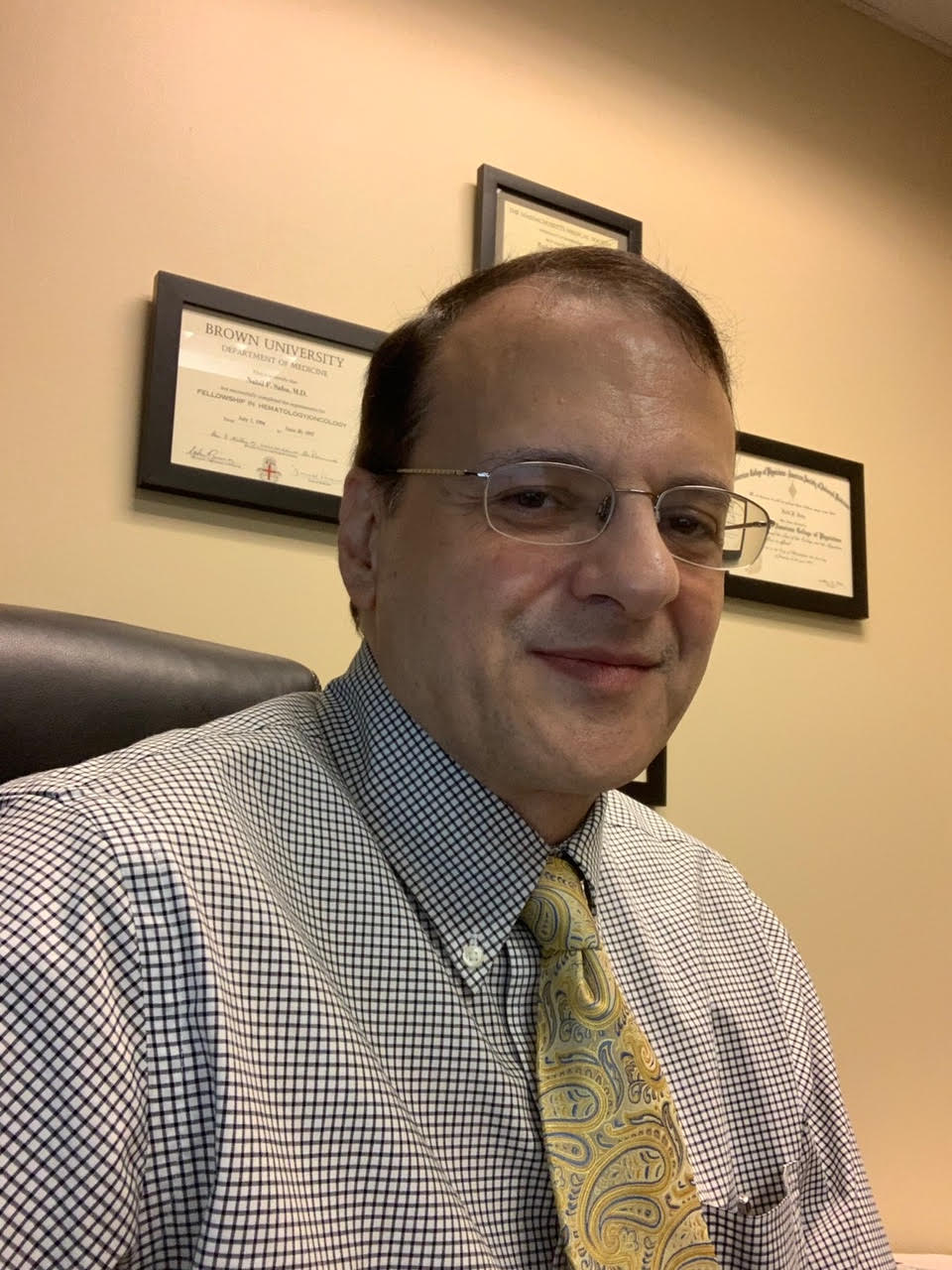
- Education: American University of Beirut
- Awards: Received Distinguished Doctor (2015)
- Scientific career
- Workplaces: Emory University
- Website: winshipcancer.emory.edu/bios/faculty/saba-nabil.html

Nabil F. Saba is an American oncologist. He is currently Professor and Vice-chair of Hematology and Medical Oncology, and Professor of Otolaryngology at the Winship Cancer Institute at the Emory University School of Medicine in Atlanta, Georgia. He is a specialist in the field of head and neck oncology. Saba has authored more than 200 peer-reviewed articles. He is the inaugural Lynne and Howard Halpern Chair in Head and Neck Cancer Research.

Saba is an elected member of the American Head and Neck Society (AHNS) and also specializes in immunotherapy for head and neck cancer, and T cell and B cell activation related to HPV-positive disease.

Saba's work focused on translational research and the study and development of novel therapeutic agents and modalities in the head, neck, and esophageal cancer. He led several clinical trials and chaired national and investigator-initiated multi-institution studies focused on novel approaches for treating these diseases. He is also the editor of two published textbooks, Sinonasal and Skull Base Malignancies and Esophageal Cancer, prevention, diagnosis, and therapy.

== Research and career ==
Nabil Saba earned a B.S. in chemistry at the American University of Beirut in Lebanon, completed his medical degree from the American University of Beirut Medical School.

Saba's research focused on targeting the epithelial growth factor receptor and related pathways in head and neck cancer and immunotherapy approaches for this disease. He investigated the role of related receptors such as HER3 and the mTOR pathway in treating advanced head and neck cancers. He also researched the role of chemoprevention in head and neck cancers. Saba is a national leader in cooperative group trials and chairs two NCTN studies within the ECOG-ACRIN cooperative group, EA3161 and EA3163.[6]

Among Saba's research is the examination of the role of targeting H-Ras in combination with EGFR inhibition in non-HRas mutated head and neck squamous cell cancers.

Saba researched the relationship between radiation dose and overall survival in cervical esophageal cancer. He also conducted research on the peritumoral vasculature in head and neck cancer, revealing that patients with metastatic disease were more likely to have high peritumoral blood microvessel density (MVD).

Saba has been the director of house staff education program at the Winship Cancer Institute of Emory University. He co-directed the head and neck cancers multi-disciplinary program and directed the Head and Neck Medical Oncology Program.

Saba was an assistant professor in the Department of Hematology and Oncology, and served as the director of house staff education programs at the Winship Cancer Institute of Emory University. During his tenure at Emory University School of Medicine, he has served in different positions including Hematology and Medical oncology Professor, Otolaryngology Professor, also lending his services at the Winship Cancer Institute of Emory University as the director of the Head and Neck Medical Oncology Program.

== Memberships and awards ==
Saba won numerous awards including:

- Atlanta Magazine's Top Doctors (2005, 2016-2018)
- Certificate of Appreciation for dedicated volunteer service on Evidence Based Medicine Committee, American Society of Clinical Oncology, 2022
- MilliPub Club Award, Emory University School of Medicine, 2020
- Director's Service Award, National Cancer Institute, 2019
- Outstanding reviewer for journal, Cancer, 2017
- Castle Connolly Top Doctors, 2011 and 2014
- Distinguished Doctor, Expert Network, 2015
- Recognition for outstanding contribution to the Fellowship program, University of Minnesota, Hematology Oncology and transplant section

Saba is a member of numerous professional organizations including the American College of Radiology, American College of Physicians, American Society of Clinical Oncology, and Massachusetts Medical Society.

== Publications ==
- N Saba, DM Sutton, HJ Ross, S Siu, RM Crump, A Keating & AK Stewart. "High treatment-related mortality in cardiac amyloid patients undergoing autologous stem cell transplant". Journal of Bone Marrow transplantation.
- Saba N.F, Goodman M, Ward K, Flowers C, Ramalingam S, Owonikoko T, Chen A, Grist W, Wadsworth T, Beitler J.J, Khuri F.R, and Shin D.M. "Gender and Ethnic Disparities in Incidence and Survival of Squamous Cell Carcinoma of the Oral Tongue, Base of Tongue, and Tonsils: A Surveillance, Epidemiology and End Results Program-Based Analysis". Journal of Oncology.
- Saba NF, Hurwitz SJ, Kono SA, Yang CS, Zhao Y, Chen Z, Sica G, Müller S, Moreno-Williams R, Lewis M, Grist W, Chen AY, Moore CE, Owonikoko TK, Ramalingam S, Beitler JJ, Nannapaneni S, Shin HJ, Grandis JR, Khuri FR, Chen ZG, Shin DM. "Chemoprevention of head and neck cancer with celecoxib and erlotinib: results of a phase ib and pharmacokinetic study". Cancer Prevention Research.
- Saba NF, Wang X, Müller S, Tighiouart M, Cho K, Nie S, Chen Z, Shin DM. "Examining expression of folate receptor in squamous cell carcinoma of the head and neck as a target for a novel nanotherapeutic drug". Journal of the Sciences and Specialties of the Head and Neck.
- Saba NF, Choi M, Muller S, Shin HJ, Tighiouart M, Papadimitrakopoulou VA, El-Naggar AK, Khuri FR, Chen ZG, Shin DM. "Role of cyclooxygenase-2 in tumor progression and survival of head and neck squamous cell carcinoma". Journal of Cancer Prevention Research.
