= Patrick Mubarak =

Lebanese actor

- Occupation: Actor

Patrick Mubarak (Arabic: باتريك مبارك) is a Lebanese actor.

== Filmography ==
=== Film ===
Year	Title	Role	Notes	Sources
2011	Alkhat	Beiruti	Short film	
2016	Karun Treasure		Voice only	

=== Television ===
- Al Haram. 2016
- Nos Yawm. 2016
- Cello. 2015
- Al Ghaliboun. 2011
- Me, You and the Internet. 2007
- Strange. 2005
- A Man from the Past. 2004
- Arabic Language Club. 1998
- Youngs and Girls. 1996
