= Rosie Al-Yaziji =

Lebanese actress

- روزي اليازجي
- Occupation: Actress

Rosie Al-Yaziji (Arabic: روزي اليازجي) is a Lebanese actress.

== Filmography ==
=== Dubbing roles ===
- Xiaolin Showdown - Wuya
- Pokémon Horizons: The Series - Onia
