= Ramsay G. Najjar =

Lebanese business executive, journalist, and writer (1952–2020)

Ramsay George Najjar (26 July 1952 – 19 November 2020) was a Lebanese business executive, journalist, and writer.

He was the founder of Saatchi & Saatchi Levant where he also served as a chief executive officer. Najjar also founded Strategic Communication Consultancy (S2C) where he served as the managing partner

== Education ==
He received his Bachelor of Arts in Comparative Literature and Master of Arts in Mass Communication.

Najjar was known for his contribution to the Lebanese Academy of Fine Arts. He was also known for his books such as Arab Philosophy Through History (published 1977), So That God Comes Back to Lebanon and The Right Not to Remain Silent.

He died from COVID-19 complications in Beirut, on 19 November 2020, aged 68, amidst the COVID-19 pandemic in Lebanon. After his death, Elie Jabre, chief executive officer of DDB Lebanon tributed Ramsay for his contributions to the advertising industry in Lebanon.
