= Milad Rizk =

Lebanese actor (born 1972)

- ميلاد رزق
- Born: 1 January 1972 (age 54)
- Occupation: Actor

Milad Rizk (Arabic: ميلاد رزق) (born 1 January 1972) is a Lebanese actor.

== Filmography ==
=== Television ===
- Takht Sharqi, 2010 (photographer)
- Al Arrab Nadi Al Sharq, 2015 (photographer)

=== Plays ===
- Khabar Agel, 2012
