= Jad Al-Akhaoui =

Lebanese journalist

Jad Al-Akhaoui, also known as Jad Akhawy or Akhawi, is a prominent Lebanese journalist.

== Background ==
Al-Akhaoui attained a BA in communications from Beirut University College (now Lebanese American University).

== Career ==
He reported stories in war-torn and disaster areas, covered the Lebanese-Israeli war in Southern Lebanon, conducted many interviews with leaders of the Middle East. In addition to reporting on the war on terrorism in Afghanistan, he took part in covering many Arab summits.

Al-Akhaoui was consulted in the LBC TV and Al Hayat newspaper merger. He was also brought in as a consultant in an effort to revamp Dubai TV.

He acted as the Project director of Quantum Communications, a corporate communications sister company to Saatchi and Saatchi. He then moved on to CNBC Arabiya, where he attained the role of vice president and head of programming and News. He then acted as an advisor to the general manager of Al Arabiya and headed the bureau of Al Arabiya in Lebanon. He was appointed as consultant to the Minister of Culture and Communications in Bahrain, and put in charge of revamping the local television station. Al-Akhaoui also attained the position of the general manager of Havas, EuroRSCG Abu Dhabi, one of the worldwide leaders in advertising and public relations companies. Mr. Al-Akhaoui is currently the consultant to the Minister of Information in the State of Kuwait.
