= Rania Zaghir =

Lebanese children's book author

Anaelle De Boulogne (Born Rania Zaghir)
- Born: July 23, 1977 (age 48); Lebanon
- Education: American University of Beirut (MA, 2007); Lebanese American University (BA, 1999)
- Occupation: Author/publisher of children's books

Anaelle de Boulogne (born Rania Zaghir) is a Paris based Lebanese French writer and publisher of children's books, several of which have been translated.

== Biography ==
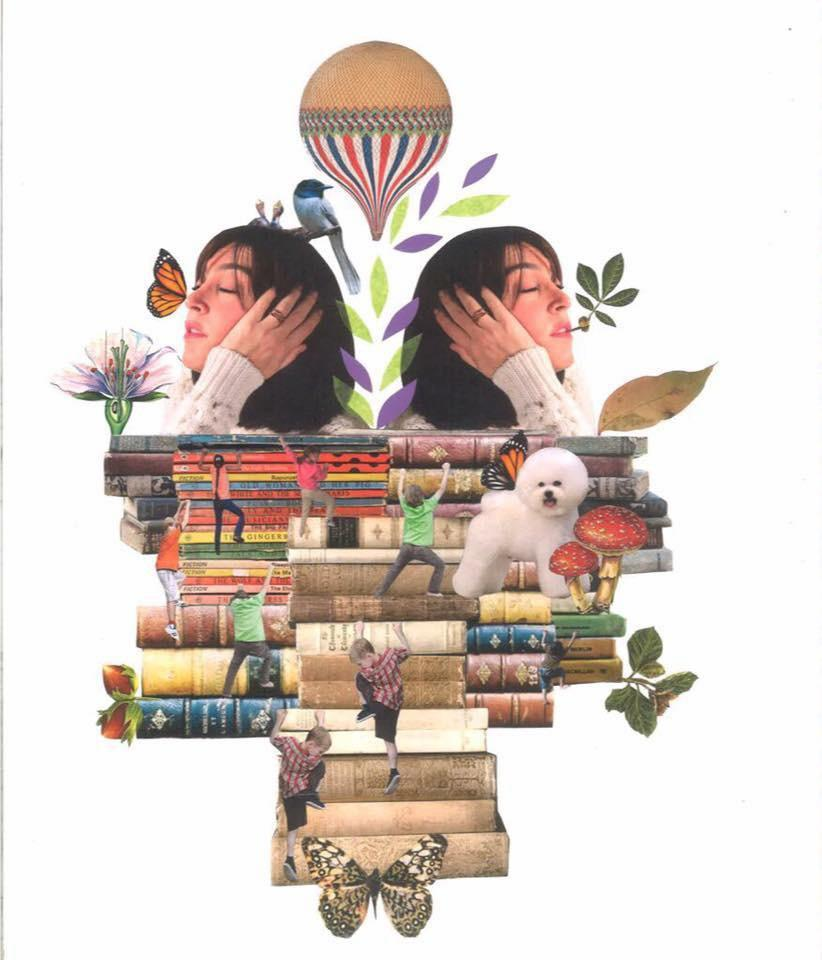
The World of Anaelle De Boulogne.

Anaëlle was born on 23 July 1977 (birth name Rania Zaghir) in Beirut, Lebanon, to Syrian parents who emigrated to Lebanon in 1960. Aged ten, she moved with her family to Syria, escaping the Lebanese civil war; there, she met her grandmother K. Rustom, who grew apple orchids, the inspiration for her book Sisi Malaket Talbas Kharofan Wa Dodatayn. Zaghir refers to her childhood years as happy despite the ongoing civil war. Her home life was characterized by strong family ties.

Anaëlle attended the same school from kindergarten to grade 12. In 1995, she passed the entrance exams and was accepted at The Lebanese American University, where she earned a BA in Communication Arts. In 1999, she started the MA program in educational psychology at American University of Beirut. Anaëlle recalls doing little work, preferring to read Amin Maalouf, Nazek Saba Yared, and Truman Capote.

She is married to French-Lebanese engineer David Sabra. They have two boys together. Anaëlle resides in Paris, France with her family.

== About ==
Anaëlle’s books have earned her numerous awards. Haltabees Haltabees earned the Berlin International Literature Festival Book Award (The Extraordinary Book 2015). She has also won the Anna Lindh Euro-Mediterranean Foundation for the Dialogue Between Cultures Award (2010), as well as Assabil (Friends of Public Libraries) 2009 Annual Award for Children's Literature granted to her in recognition of her book “Sisi Malakit Talbas Kharofan wa Dodatayn” (Al Khayyat Al Saghir Publishing House - The Little Tailor). This book has been translated into Italian and published by Serendapita, while “Lamma Balatet el Baher” has been translated into Korean and “Man Lahasa Karna il Booza” into 19 languages and is published by Edition Orient – Berlin.

She also co-founded and curated the International biannual children's literature conference known as: What a Story!

In 2013, She established a national book charity: Libraries of Hope.

In 2007, Anaëlle founded Al Khayyat Al Saghir Publishing House.

In 2022, Anaëlle founded and directed a Parisian based NGO called Le Petit Tailleur.

== Awards ==
Her books have earned her numerous awards

Beirut earned the Beirut BookFair Best Children's Book Award in 2016.

Haltabees Haltabees earned the Berlin International Literature Festival Book Award (The Extraordinary Book 2015).

The Anna Lindh Euro-Mediterranean Foundation for the Dialogue Between Cultures Award (2010).

Assabil (Friends of Public Libraries) 2009 Annual Award for Children's Literature granted to her in recognition of her book “Sisi Malakit Talbas Kharofan wa Dodatayn” (Al Khayyat Al Saghir Publishing House - The Little Tailor).

== Publications ==
- 2018: Fikreyyeh
- 2016: khkhkh, Kuttab Laysa An Harf Al Khaa
- 2015: Al-Khayyat Al Saghir
- 2014: Haltabees, Ashaar Min Sumsum Wa Khayrat
- 2011: Haltabees, Haltabees
- 2010: Man Lahasa Qarn Al-Bootha
- 2009: Limatha Amtarat Al Samaa Koursa wa Waraq Inab
- 2009: Sissi Malaket Talbasu Kharufan Wa Dudatayn
- 2007: Lamma Ballat El Bahr
- 2005: Sabbat Ayyam Fi Olbat Alwan
- 2004: Hal Raaita Ahroufi
- 2001: Akhi Al Sagheer
