= Ouday Raad =

Lebanese actor and voice actor (born 1966)

- Born: June 11, 1966 (age 59)
- Occupations: Actor, voice actor

Ouday Raad (Arabic: عدي رعد, 11 June 1966) is a Lebanese actor and voice actor.

== Filmography ==
=== Film ===
- 33 Days. 2013
- Tuff Incident (sound direction). 2007

=== Television ===
- Ain El Jawza. 2015
- Darb Al-Yasamin. 2015
- Sanaoud Baad Kalil. 2013
- Al Ghaliboun. 2011-2012
- Between Love and Dust. 2009

=== Dubbing roles ===
- Doctor Who
- The Men of Angelos
- M.I. High - Frank London, Lenny Bicknall
- Mokhtarnameh - Ubayd Allah ibn Ziyad
