= Tarek Zeidan =

Lebanese sexual and bodily rights activist

- Occupations: Sexual and bodily rights activist
- Known for: Director of Helem (2012–2024)

Tarek Zeidan is a Lebanese sexual and bodily rights activist. He led Helem in several capacities between 2012 and 2024, initially as its unpaid chairperson and later as executive director. He engaged in academic fellowships focused on digital rights and LGBTQ+ issues in the Global South. Zeidan has an academic background from Tufts University and Harvard University, and has previously worked with the Brookings Institution and the Carnegie Endowment for International Peace.

== Education and early career ==
Zeidan was raised in Beirut, Lebanon, and completed a Master in Public Administration (MPA) at the John F. Kennedy School of Government at Harvard University in 2018, specializing in human rights law and advocacy. He also holds a Master of Arts degree in international relations from the Fletcher School of Law and Diplomacy at Tufts University. Before his leadership at Helem, he held regional communications and strategic-planning roles for the Middle East and North Africa (MENA) at the Brookings Institution and the Carnegie Endowment for International Peace.

== Activism and leadership ==
Zeidan became director of Helem in 2012. Under his leadership, the organization functioned as a legal aid clinic, civil watchdog, and policy research tank. During his twelve-year administration, Helem was confronted with legal challenges, including a defamation lawsuit filed by the Lebanese Ministry of Interior bans against public gatherings. His tenure saw Helem coordinate strategic litigation addressing judicial interpretations regarding Article 534 of the Lebanese Penal Code.

After leaving Helem in 2024, Zeidan became a Fellow at the Center for Public Leadership and an Emerging Human Rights Fellow at the Carr Center for Human Rights Policy at Harvard University. He later joined the Program on Law and Society in the Muslim World at Harvard Law School as a Visiting Fellow for the 2025–2026 academic term. Zeidan's academic research concentrates on digital rights and the intersection of technology and human rights, investigating how artificial intelligence affects LGBTQ+ individuals in the Global South and the MENA region. He is a Ford Foundation Global Fellow and an Ashoka Foundation Global Changemaker.

== See also ==
- LGBTQ rights in Lebanon
- Human rights in Lebanon
