= Maya Yazbek =

Maya Yazbek مايا يزبك
- Born: 1967
- Citizenship: Lebanon
- Occupation: Singer
- Known for: Performances like Habibi Ya Eini
- Father: George Yazbek

Maya Yazbek, (Arabic: مايا يزبك, born 1967) is a Lebanese singer who is famous for her songs "Bokra Rah Betsafer" (You will leave tomorrow), and "Habibi Ya Eini" (My love, my eyes).

== Origin ==
Born and raised in Lebanon in 1967, artist Maya Yazbek comes from an artistic family. Her father is the late composer George Yazbek, and her brother Basem Yazbek is a percussionist, with whom she formed a successful trio. In 1983, she released the album "Ana w el Asfour" produced by "Sawt Beirut" and distributed by EMI. Maya Yazbek became famous for her song "Bokra Rah Betsafer" and her percussive song "Habibi Ya Eini". In 2011, she tried, along with Amir Yazbek, to present her old productions in a new format, but failed.

== Personal life ==
At the age of twenty, she married violinist Mazen Zawaidi and had two children, Basem and Lara.
