= Edma Abouchdid =

Lebanese gynecologist

- Born: 1909
- Died: 11 October 1992 (aged 82–83)
- Medical career
- Profession: Medicine
- Field: Obstetrics, gynecology
- Institutions: American University of Beirut
- Sub-specialties: Infertility

Edma Abouchdid (1909–11 October 1992) was a Lebanese obstetrician-gynecologist. Abouchdid became a well-regarded specialist in infertility, and her patient base included Middle Eastern royal families. She advocated for family planning at a time when the promotion of contraception in Lebanon was punishable by a jail sentence.

== Early life ==
Born in Brazil, Abouchdid grew up in Lebanon and decided at age 15 that she wanted to become a physician. At the time, Lebanese women were expected to simply choose good husbands rather than pursuing higher education. In 1924, the American University of Beirut (AUB) announced that it would be open to admitting women into its medical school. Abouchdid was able to meet the criteria for medical school admission in 1926, but she had to pass herself off as two years older than her actual age.

Abouchdid's admission to medical school was contingent upon the school's ability to recruit a second female student. The dean did not want Abouchdid to enter medical school as the lone female in a class of 70 students. Abouchdid's acceptance to the school almost fell through when her female classmate, who was coming from the U.S., decided to get married rather than attending medical school. However, AUB's dean ultimately allowed Abouchdid to enroll anyway. Abouchdid graduated from AUB's medical school in 1931; for several years, she was the school's only female medical student or graduate.

== Career ==
Abouchdid wanted to be an obstetrician-gynecologist, but she was sensitive to the impact that her gender might have on her credibility in the specialty. There were few women in medicine in the Middle East, and she thought that by working in obstetrics, she would be mistaken for a midwife. She decided to first become a pediatrician, where she could establish a reputation for herself as a competent physician before entering obstetrics and gynecology. She trained in pediatrics and obstetrics in Paris and London before working for several years at the Royal Medical College in Baghdad.

In 1945, Abouchdid began a three-year stint of postgraduate training in the U.S., gaining experience at Johns Hopkins University, Duke University and Columbia University. During her time in the U.S., she was exposed to advances in reproductive endocrinology and infertility, and that became a particular focus for the rest of her work in medicine. Returning to Lebanon, Abouchdid established an infertility clinic, joined the AUB faculty and started an association for Lebanese female physicians. She became an expert in the treatment of infertility, treating both men and women and serving some of the royal families in the Middle East.

By the 1950s, Abouchdid was involved in medicine on a worldwide level, having been named the Lebanese national secretary to the International Fertility Association. She visited the U.S. again in 1958 as a guest of Robert Hardy Andrews and his wife, and she spoke in support of the U.S. military presence in the Middle East to facilitate Lebanese independence.

== Later life ==
Abouchdid founded the Family Planning Association of Lebanon and served as its first president. By 1970, the association was working to change opinions and legislation related to contraception in Lebanon, but the group carefully limited its activities because the promotion, possession or sale of contraception was associated with a six-month to twelve-month prison sentence. For her contributions to medicine, Abouchdid was honored with a chivalry medal from the Equestrian Order of the Holy Sepulchre of Jerusalem, a distinction that had been previously reserved for men. She retired in 1985 and died of heart problems seven years later.
