= Renee Ghosh =

Lebanese actress

- رينيه غوش
- Occupation: Actress

Renee Ghosh (Arabic: رينيه غوش) is a Lebanese actress.

== Filmography ==
=== Film ===
- I Offered You Pleasure - Imane (Short). 2011
- Love Me. 2003 Helper Director

=== Television ===
- Samra. 2016
- Youngs and Girls. 1996
- Spring of the Love. 1995
- Fingers from Gold. 1995

=== Dubbing roles ===
- M.I. High
- Prophet Joseph - Tama
- Toy Story 2 - Barbie (Classical Arabic version)
  - Toy Story 3 - Barbie (Classical Arabic version)
- Xiaolin Showdown - Kimiko

=== Writing career ===
- Yara (film)
