= Samir Maalouf =

Lebanese actor and voice actor

- Occupations: Actor, voice actor
- Spouse: Marcelle Marina

Samir Maalouf (Arabic: سمير معلوف) is a Lebanese actor and voice actor.

== Filmography ==
=== Film ===
- Fire of Love. 1968
- Hello Love. 1968

=== Television ===
- Stingies. 1983
- Honesty - Samir. 1982
- The White Mask. 1974
- Adventures of Nader - Zakarya. 1969
- International Comedy

=== Dubbing roles ===
- Ben 10: Alien Force - Max Tennyson
- Ben 10: Ultimate Alien - Max Tennyson
- Ben 10: Omniverse - Max Tennyson, Mr. Baumann, Will Harangue
- Cars - Mater (Classical Arabic version)
- Cars 2 - Mater (Classical Arabic version)
- Chicken Little - Turkey Lurkey (Classical Arabic version)
- Finding Nemo - Gill (Classical Arabic version)
- Inside Out - Fear
- Meet the Robinsons - Bud Robinson (Classical Arabic version)
- The Looney Tunes Show - Elmer Fudd (Lebanese dubbing version)
