= Ali Youssef Charara =

- Occupation: Businessman
- Organization: Spectrum Investment Group Holding SAL
- Known for: Financial ties to Hezbollah
- Title: Chairman and General Manager of Spectrum Investment Group Holding SAL
- Criminal charge: Sanctioned for financing terrorism
- Criminal status: Sanctioned by the U.S. Department of the Treasury and the Saudi State Security Presidency

Ali Youssef Charara is a Lebanese businessman and financier, best known for his involvement in the telecommunications sector and his financial ties to the militant group Hezbollah. Charara has been implicated in supporting Hezbollah through commercial ventures and has faced sanctions from multiple governments as a result.

== Business Ventures ==
Charara serves as the chairman and general manager of Spectrum Investment Group Holding SAL, a telecommunications company based in Lebanon that provides services across the Middle East, Africa, and Europe. According to the U.S. Department of the Treasury, Charara and his company have received millions of dollars from Hezbollah to invest in commercial projects that provide financial support to the group. He is also known, according to the U.S. government, to have extensive business interests in the telecommunications industry in West Africa and has worked on oil ventures in Iraq.

== Sanctions ==
On January 7, 2016, the United States imposed sanctions on Charara and Spectrum Investment Group for their alleged involvement in financing Hezbollah. The U.S. Treasury designated Charara as a Specially Designated Global Terrorist (SDGT) under Executive Order 13224, which allows for the freezing of any assets held under U.S. jurisdiction and prohibits U.S. citizens and entities from engaging in transactions with him. The sanctions were implemented as part of a broader effort to cut off Hezbollah's access to international financial systems through individuals like Charara, who have facilitated the group's financial operations.

In addition to Spectrum's activities, Charara has been linked to various business dealings in oil and telecommunications, particularly in Iraq and West Africa, which have been used to generate financial support for Hezbollah.

In 2019, Charara faced additional legal consequences when the government of The Gambia declared him "persona non grata" and banned him from entering the country. This followed the findings of the Gambian government's Janneh Commission, which implicated Charara in a fraudulent deal with former Gambian president Yahya Jammeh, involving the state telecommunications companies GAMTEL and GAMCEL. Spectrum Investment Group purchased 50% of the companies for less than their market value, leading to significant financial losses for the Gambian government.

The U.S. government has offered a reward of up to $10 million for information that could disrupt Charara's financial operations in support of Hezbollah, as part of the Rewards for Justice Program.

On May 31, 2018, the Kingdom of Saudi Arabia has also designated Charara, along with his company Spectrum Investment Group, as a supporter of Hezbollah under its Law of Combating the Crimes of Terrorism and its Financing. This action was part of a joint effort by Saudi Arabia's State Security Presidency and the Terrorist Financing Targeting Center (TFTC), which includes the United States and other Gulf Cooperation Council (GCC) member states such as Bahrain, Kuwait, Oman, the United Arab Emirates, and Qatar.

The designation was part of a move targeting senior Hezbollah leadership and supporters. Charara and other individuals were included in this classification due to their financial involvement in Hezbollah's operations. The sanctions imposed by Saudi Arabia froze all property and interests in property of the designated individuals that were within Saudi jurisdiction. The law prohibits any Saudi person or entity from conducting business with these individuals. This move was coordinated with the U.S. and other TFTC members, aimed at disrupting Hezbollah's activities and cutting off its financial networks.

== See also ==
- Hezbollah
- Sanctions against Hezbollah
