= Hasan Hamdan =

Lebanese actor. and voice actor

- حسن حمدان
- Occupations: Actor, voice actor

Hasan Hamdan (Arabic: حسن حمدان) is a Lebanese actor and voice actor.

== Filmography ==
=== Film ===
- Online - Zaki + Creator. 2011 (short)

=== Television ===
- Darb Al-Yasamin. 2015
- Ain El Jawza. 2015
- Bab Almorad
- Sanaoud Baad Kalil. 2013
- Goodness Road. 1998
- Arabic Language Club. 1998

=== Dubbing roles ===
- 1001 Nights
- Alice in Wonderland - Cheshire Cat (Classical Arabic version)
- M.I. High
- Saint Mary
- The Men of Angelos
