= Maysa Assaf =

Lebanese television presenter and fashion journalist

- ميساء عساف
- Education: Political science, mass communication
- Occupations: TV presenter, fashion journalist, celebrity stylist
- Known for: TV personality - red carpet critique
- Television: The Power of Styling program; B Beirut (LBC); Fashion Time (Rotana Khalijia and LBC

Maysa Assaf is a Lebanese television presenter, fashion journalist, and celebrity stylist. She hosts and presents The Powers of Styling, and is a frequent contributor to other Lebanese and Arab variety and fashion shows. Assaf is known for her sharp runway and red carpet style critiques, and as a fashion show panelist.

== Education and career ==
Assaf holds a BA in Mass Communication and Political Science. She began her career as a fashion journalist, and master of ceremonies.

Assaf hosts and presents her own show, The Power of Styling, and she is a frequent contributor to variety show B Beirut, and Fashion Time. Following the success of her TV and fashion journalism career, Assaf started her own image consultancy, personal shopping, and etiquette business. Assaf is widely recognized in the Arab World for her stinging runway and red carpet fashion critiques, and as a fashion show panelist. Her celebrity clients include Lebanese artists Yara, Myriam Fares, and Arab and international celebrities Angham, Laila Elwi, Iveta Mukuchyan, Latifa, Maysaa Maghrebi, and Nesreen Tafesh.
