= Nayla Chidiac =

French-Lebanese psychologist and poet

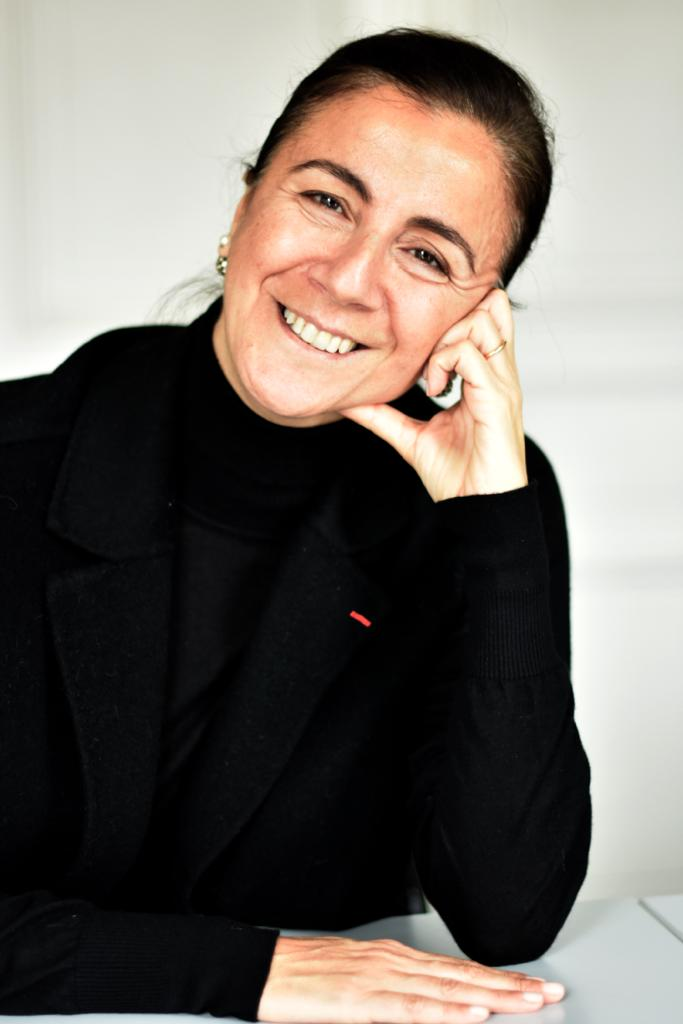
Nayla Chidiac in 2023

Nayla Chidiac (born 1966) is a French-Lebanese clinical psychologist, writer and poet. Her clinical work focuses on psychological trauma, and she founded therapeutic writing workshops at the Sainte-Anne Hospital Center in Paris. She has written four books on therapeutic writing and psychological trauma and has published five collections of poetry. She was made a knight of the Legion of Honour in 2017.

== Early life ==
Chidiac was born in Lebanon. In a 2019 interview with the Lebanese cultural publication Agenda Culturel, she said she discovered poetry at the age of 15 through the work of Paul Éluard and Georges Schehadé, and that she had wanted to care for others from an early age. She saw literature as a passion and did not think of it as a possible profession.

== Career ==
=== Clinical work and teaching ===
Chidiac is a clinical psychologist with a doctorate in psychopathology. She works on psychological trauma in adults. At the Sainte-Anne Hospital Center she created a therapeutic writing workshop, having observed that the department used art therapies such as painting, music, sculpture and dance but lacked a writing workshop. She describes the workshops as therapeutic. Participants respond to writing prompts within a fixed frame and the texts remain their own; the groups have no publication goal.

She has taught at the École des Psychologues Praticiens and at Paris 6 University. She is a member of the Literature and Psychiatry section of the World Psychiatric Association. A biographical note from her publisher states that she has worked as an external mental health specialist for the United Nations and is a former expert to the Paris tribunal de grande instance.

In a 2024 interview with L'Orient-Le Jour, published while war was again affecting Lebanon, Chidiac said that she began to see Lebanese patients mainly after the 2020 Beirut explosion. She discussed the psychological effects of the war on patients in Lebanon and in the diaspora, and said she had trained the leaders of the Association of Victims of Terrorism in Lebanon, which offers therapeutic writing workshops on request.

=== Books ===
Chidiac's manual Ateliers d'écriture thérapeutique (Elsevier Masson, 2010) is aimed at therapists who run writing workshops with patients. She has said that she began by publishing articles and was then approached by publishers who noted that no book existed on the subject. The manual is organised in four parts: history and theory, indications, narrative forms, and tools for the therapist. It has been reissued. The 2013 second edition expanded its treatment of psychological trauma and distinguished individual from group workshops.

In 2014 she contributed to Traumatismes psychiques (Elsevier Masson), a multi-author practical guide to the psychological care of victims, edited by Louis Crocq. Les Bienfaits de l'écriture, les bienfaits des mots (Odile Jacob, 2022) is, in her words, a version of the manual for a general readership, with exercises and practical cases. L'Écriture qui guérit (Odile Jacob, 2025) treats writing and war trauma through an alphabetical survey of writers.

In 2025 Elsevier Masson published Psychothérapies des traumatismes psychiques, which she co-wrote with Yann Auxéméry. It has three parts, covering the clinical aspects of trauma, principles of treatment, and therapeutic mediations such as body therapy, art therapy, animal-assisted therapy and dance therapy.

=== Poetry ===
Chidiac's poetry is published by Librairie-Galerie Racine in Paris, which has issued five of her collections between 2010 and 2023. According to the publisher's summary, the poems in the first, Le Pays où les arbres ont peur (2010), deal with sectarian conflict in Lebanon and childhood damaged by war. Une nuit un matin (2015) consists of a poem in tercets for two voices, a woman's and a man's, followed by free-verse poems. She has said that she writes to give meaning to suffering by making intimate experience visible and known.

Reviewing the most recent collection, Tu me réveilleras lorsque je serai morte ?, L'Orient-Le Jour described it as an unconventional work that mixes narrative, memories, dreams and letters. Its subjects are death, love and poetry, and Paris and Beirut recur as reference points. In May 2023 she took part in a public conversation on poetry with Michael Edwards of the Académie française, moderated by the literary journalist Simon Bentolila.

== Honours ==
Chidiac was appointed a chevalier (knight) of the Legion of Honour by decree of 14 April 2017.

== Works ==
=== Non-fiction ===
- Ateliers d'écriture thérapeutique (Therapeutic Writing Workshops). Elsevier Masson, 2010; 2nd ed., 2013. ISBN 978-2-294-72752-8.
- Contributor to Louis Crocq (ed.), Traumatismes psychiques: prise en charge psychologique des victimes (Psychological Trauma: Psychological Care of Victims). 2nd ed. Elsevier Masson, 2014. ISBN 978-2-294-71381-1.
- Les Bienfaits de l'écriture, les bienfaits des mots: un atelier d'écriture (The Benefits of Writing, the Benefits of Words: A Writing Workshop). Odile Jacob, 2022. ISBN 978-2-415-00096-7.
- L'Écriture qui guérit: traumatismes de guerre et littérature (Writing That Heals: War Trauma and Literature). Odile Jacob, 2025. ISBN 978-2-415-01065-2.
- With Yann Auxéméry: Psychothérapies des traumatismes psychiques: mieux comprendre pour mieux soigner (Psychotherapies for Psychological Trauma: Understanding Better to Treat Better). Elsevier Masson, 2025. ISBN 978-2-294-78847-5.

=== Poetry ===
All published by Librairie-Galerie Racine, Paris.

- Le Pays où les arbres ont peur (The Country Where the Trees Are Afraid), 2010
- L'Aube à genoux (Dawn on Its Knees), 2012
- Une nuit un matin (One Night, One Morning), 2015
- La Flûte de haschisch (The Hashish Flute), 2019
- Tu me réveilleras lorsque je serai morte ? (Will You Wake Me When I Am Dead?), 2023
