= Ghassan Afiouni =

Lebanese scientist

Ghassan Afiouni (Arabic: غسان أفيوني) is a scientist who was born in Tripoli, a town in Lebanon located on the coast of the Mediterranean Sea. Afiouni developed a type of compressed wood that cannot be burned. The invention has been patented in the United States of America and he holds three other related patents pertaining to the field of fire safety, for which he was awarded Pennsylvania's Gold Award.

== Career ==
A teacher who used to work at Ibn Khuldoon National School, Mr Afioni now lives with his family in his native country Lebanon(Tripoly) and works as an entrepreneurial inventor. Afiouni's achievements during his teaching career included the creation of the school's first ever middle school science fair that is still being sustained. Afiouni enjoyed an incredible rapport with his students in middle school. After he moved to teach IB physics in the Secondary School, he developed a teaching mechanism that involves a projector that allows all class lectures to be recorded. This technique might be employed in some Bahrain universities, as he has given seminars that explain the mechanism of the technique. His latest project was KAG, a car that he developed and created from nothing but shaped piping which gave the car its unique look. The car uses some technologies replacing the rear-view mirror with a camera, automatic open and close doors, and liquid electronic display (LED) lighting all over the body and engine, which is open to view. His past research involves the development of conductive polymers coated on non-conductive substrates for use in multi-spectral screening material. He also worked on the use of zero-valent metal and ultrasonic energy for an in-situ ground water remediation of chlorinated hydrocarbons. He received the Kathleen McIntyre Award for his outstanding achievements.
