= Pamela El Kik =

Lebanese actress (born 1988)

Pamela El Kik باميلا الكيك
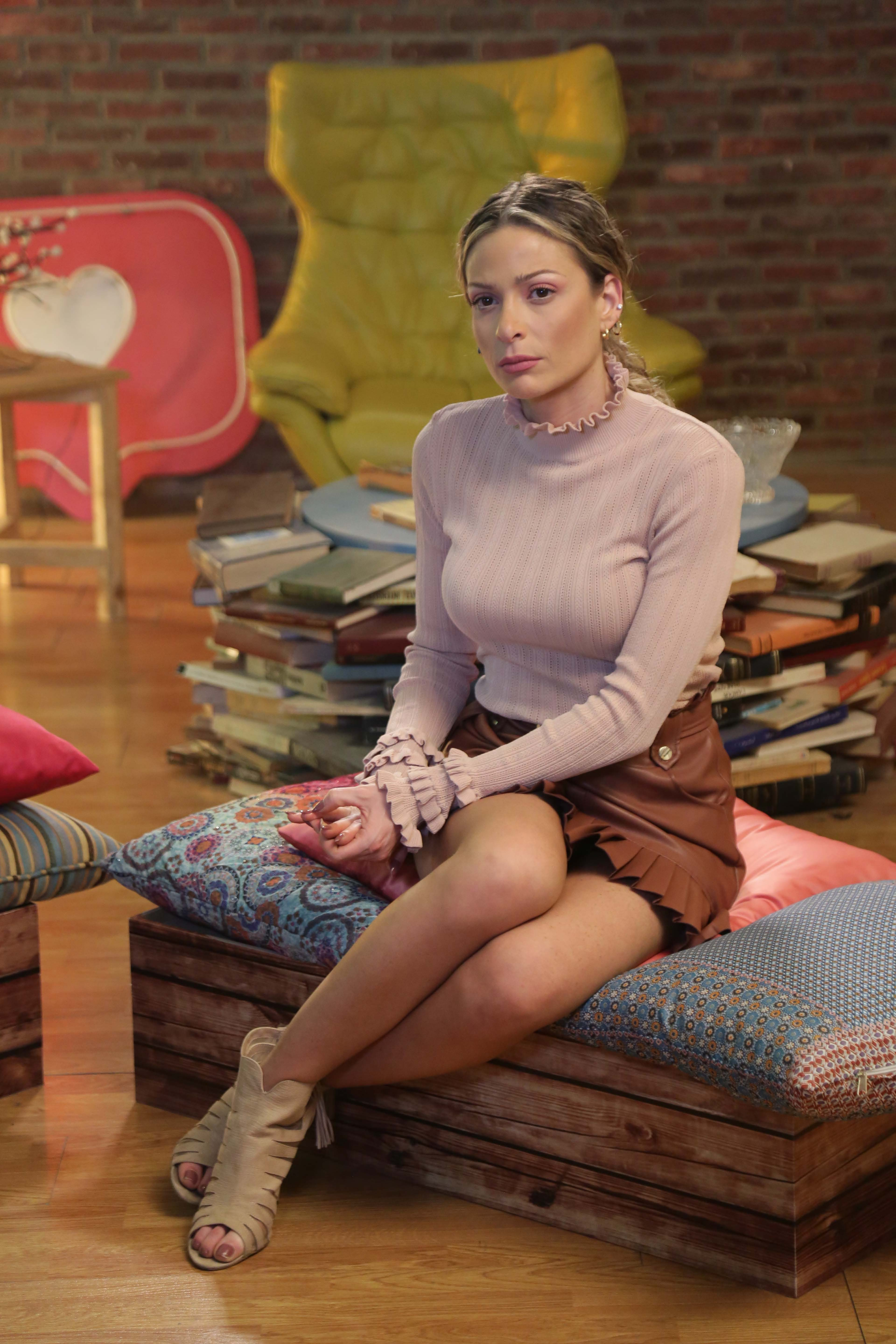
- El Kik in 2020
- Born: May 14, 1988 (age 38); Deir al-Qamar, Lebanon
- Education: Holy Spirit University of Kaslik
- Occupation: Actress
- Years active: 2008–present
- Height: 1.65 m (5 ft 5 in)
- Awards: Murex d’Or three times
- Website: http://www.pamelaelkik.com/

Pamela El Kik (Arabic: باميلا الكيك; born 14 May 1988 in Deir al-Qamar) is a Lebanese actor who grew up in Ashrafieh, Lebanon. She began her career at an early age. She won the Murex d'Or three times; her most famous wins were for Alhob Almamnou’ in 2010, Duo Al Gharam in 2012 And Samra in 2016.

== Early life and career ==
El Kik was born in Deir al-Qamar, south-east of Beirut. Her first appearances were long sketches shot with Wassim Tabbarah, at the age of 15. Tabbarah encouraged her to be follow a career in art; the young Pamela wanted since to be a professional actress.

El Kik started her early formal career at the age of 18 while studying communication arts specialized in cinema at The Holy Spirit University of Kaslik (USEK). She participated in some local works: Erbit Tenhall (2005), Imraa Min Dayaa (2005), Madame Bambino (2006) and Sara (2009).

== Personal life ==
In June 2023 during an interview on Al Jadeed, El Kik addressed speculation about her personal life, stating that she had been wrongly labeled based on her acting roles. She expressed support for personal freedom and said she would not object to marrying a woman if she fell in love. El Kik also clarified that she is attracted to men but would be open to a relationship with a woman under certain circumstances. She rejected being labeled and emphasized that love should not be limited by societal expectations, stating, "I am not a lesbian; I am everything," and explained that she loves "love in whatever form it comes," adding that if, after many years, she fell in love with a woman, she would accept those feelings rather than identify with a specific sexual orientation. She later revealed that she had received marriage proposals from both men and women. In June 2026, El Kik stated that she identifies as aromantic asexual.

== Awards ==
- Murex d’or Award for Best Supporting Actress for her performance in Samra (2016)
- Murex d’or Award for Best Supporting Actress for her performance in The Forbidden Love (2010).
- Murex d’or Award for Best Supporting Actress for her performance in Due El Gharam (2012).

== Works ==
=== Series ===
Role	Series Name	Year
Maya Daw	Asr Al Harim	2008
Ragheda	Sara	2009
Nancy	Love Step	2009
Sally	Dr Hala	2009
Natasha	Madame Carmen	2010
Tamara	Ajyal	2010
Sally	The Forbidden Love	2010
Fouda	Due El Gharam	2012
Carla Gharib	Roots	2012
Manal	The Blind Love	2013
Jaqueline Juan	Made in Iran	2014
Yassmine	Second Chance	2014
Kamilia	Mawlana Al Aasheq	2015
Raneem	Sarkhet Rouh	2016
Cozette	School of Love – Words triangle	2016
Bana	School of Love – Special Case triangle	2016
Tina	Ya Rayt	2016
Reem	Samra	2016
Noura	The Real Love	2017–2018
Three characters: Lamis, Lama and Laila	Love Is Crazy – Almaza quintet	2018
Naya	Love Is Crazy – Notebooks of the Past quintet	2019
Lana	Alal Hilwa Wa Al Morra	2021
Aliya	Crystal	2023
Nour	Hayat Okhra	2024

=== Films ===
Role	Series Name	Year
Roula	Madame Bambino	2011
Dina	Marital Rape	2013
Taghreed	By Accident	2019
Ray	Yerbo bi Ezzkoun	2019
Sahar	Yom Eh Yom La	2020
Malak	Fares	2022

=== TV shows ===
- She participated in Celebrity Duets first season on LBCI in (2011), where she sang with many artists including: Assi El-Hallani, Kathem El-Saher, Marwan Khoury, Moein Shreif and other big names.
- Casino du Liban also collaborated with Pamela when she guest starred Broadway Show that was hosted there over 3 successful nights.

=== Books ===
In 2014, El Kik revealed her mindset through a book, No’ta (نقطة), which was launched during the Arabic Book Fair in Beirut. The book is a social, artistic and political handwritten quotes diary.

=== Other works ===
El Kik joined George Khabbaz in a play called Aal Tarik.
