= Feghali =

Feghali or Feghaly is a Levantine Arabic surname. It may refer to:

- Christopher El Feghali (born 2009), Lebanese racing driver
- Bassem Feghali, Lebanese comedian, singer and drag queen
- Imad Feghaly, Lebanese actor and voice actor
- Jandira Feghali (born (1957), Brazilian politician
- Jeanette Feghali, better known as Sabah (1927–2014), Lebanese singer and actress
- José Feghali (1961–2014), Brazilian pianist
- Roger Feghali (born 1973), Lebanese rally driver
