= Jihad Al-Atrash =

Lebanese actor

- Born: January 21, 1943 (age 83)
- Occupations: actor, voice actor
- Years active: 1962–present

Jihad Al-Atrash (Arabic: جهاد الأطرش, 28 August 1943) is a Lebanese actor and voice actor.

== Filmography ==
=== Film ===
- The Lebanon I Dream Of - Himself. 2009
- Tuff Incident - Imam Husayn voice. 2007
- Alebaa Procession - Imam Husayn ibn Ali voice. 2005

=== Television ===
- Ajyal - Raif. 2010
- Cello - Narrator. 2015

=== Plays ===
- The Knight. 2016

=== Dubbing roles ===
- Around the World with Willy Fog - Willy Fog
- Arrow Emblem: Hawk of the Grand Prix - Takaya Todoroki
- Manga Aesop Monogatari
- Manga Hajimete Monogatari
- Manga Sarutobi Sasuke
- The Many Dream Journeys of Meme
- The Men of Angelos
- Nobody's Boy: Remi - Driscoll
- Pokémon - Narrator
- Saint Mary - Zechariah
- Serendipity the Pink Dragon
- UFO Robot Grendizer - Duke Fleed/Daisuke Umon

== Awards ==
Year	Award	Nominee/Work	Category	Result
	(Australia) Australian governments award	Himself	Combating the violence	Won
2001	(Tunisia) The Arab Radio and Television awards	Byblos and Blueness of the sea		Silver
2003	(Egypt) Arab States Broadcasting Union awards	Sun City - Baalbek		Gold
2003	(Egypt) The Arab Radio and Television awards	Saint Mary	Promotion	Silver
