= Muhammad Ibrahim (actor) =

- محمد إبراهيم
- Born: January 7, 1955 (age 71); Hjoula, Lebanon
- Occupations: Actor, radio actor, voice actor

Muhammad Ibrahim (Arabic: محمد إبراهيم, born January 7, 1955) is a Lebanese actor, radio actor and voice actor.

== Filmography ==
=== Film ===
- The Suspect (2009)

=== Television ===
- Dr. Hala - Nadeem. 2010
- Sarah. 2008
- Izz ad-Din al-Qassam - Salem. 1999
- Laugh and Cry. 1997
- The Third Man. 1985
- Shawl of Spring - Fuad. 1985
