= Khaled El Sayed =

Lebanese actor and voice actor

- خالد السید
- Born: 19 April 1948 (age 77); Beirut, Lebanon
- Occupations: Actor, voice actor

Khaled El Sayed (Arabic: خالد السيد) is a Lebanese actor and voice actor.

== Filmography ==
=== Film ===
Year	Title	Role	Notes	Sources
	The Final Trail			
1973	Talk in Love			
1980	Mermaid			
1981	The Adventurers			
1981	Circle of Deceit	Progressive Officer	uncredited	
1982	Savages			
1983	The Hero's Return			
1984	Cotton candy		Producer	
1985	Adolescente, sucre d'amour	Man with one eye		
1985	Kanya Ya Ma Kan, Beyrouth	Driver		
1985	Shawl of the Spring			
1985	Al-Marourah			
1986	Ayam El Lolo			
1992	Naji al-Ali			
1994	Karim Abu Chakra in Military service			
2005	Al Mashhad Al Akhir	Barhaam		
2009	Charbel: The Movie	Bou Ali	Credited as Khaled el Saied	
2011	Taxi Ballad	Cafe Owner		
2015	Princess of Rome		Voice only	
2018	Damascus Time		Role of ISIS-Terrorist "Saadiyeh"	

=== Television ===
Year	Title	Role	Notes	Sources
	Al Isa'a			
1973	Akhoot Shanay			
1974	Al Kinaa Al Abyadh			
1976	Yesed Masaokom			
1979	Al Asira			
1980	Le kol El Nas			
1980	Rijal Wa Mawafiq			
1982	Arbaa Majanin W Bas			
1982	Al Amana			
1984	Al Fatihoun			
1985	Ohrubo Jay El Qfoura			
1985	Shawl Al Rabih			
1985	Ehtharo Salem Al Fre			
1987	Ferdos El Kalemat			
1987	Al Fajr			
1989	Ela Al Shabab Maa Al Tahya			
1990	Juha Al Dahek Al Baki	Saleh		
1995	Al Siham Al Jariha			
1997	Samaa W Ataa			
1997	Adhak w Abki			
1999	Izz ad-Din al-Qassam		Voice only	
2002	Im Visier der Zielfahnder	Halim Saleh		
2003	Hikayat Amal			
2003	Soar Daea			
2005	Saemon... W Laken			
2005	Khataya Saghira			
2007	Al Sajina			
2007	Domoa Al Nadam			
2008	Wroud Momazaqa			
2009	Riah El Thawra			
2010	Tash ma Tash	Betros		
2011	Al Ghaliboun			
2011	Al Armala W Al Shaytan			
2012	Al Kinaaa			
2012	Tala Nazil			
2013	Chawareh Al Zill	Teacher		
2012	Indama Yabki Altourab			
2014	Yasmina			
2014	What If			
2015	Cello	Fawaz		
2016	Al Haram			
2016	Samra	Samra's father		
2016	Kawalis Al Madina	Fahri		

=== Plays ===
- Waylon Le Omma. - Sergeant 2013
- I Reached the 99. 2008

=== Dubbing roles ===
- 1001 Nights
- Alfred J. Kwak
- Alice in Wonderland (1951 film) - Walrus (Classical Arabic version)
- Arabian Nights: Sinbad's Adventures
- Astroganger - Ganger
- Batman & Mr. Freeze: SubZero - Dr. Gregory Belson
- Bolt (2008 film) - Dr. Calico (Classical Arabic version)
- The Bush Baby
- Chōdenji Robo Combattler V
- Courage the Cowardly Dog
- The Cramp Twins
- Dexter's Laboratory (Image Production House version)
- Dot and Keeto
- The Great Mouse Detective - Major Dr. David Q. Dawson (Classical Arabic version)
- Haikara-san ga Tōru
- Hello! Sandybell
- Huckleberry Finn Monogatari
- Igano Kabamaru - Shirakawa, Saizō Igano
- Mokhtarnameh - Abd Allah ibn al-Zubayr
- Manga Aesop Monogatari
- Manga Hajimete Monogatari
- Manga Sarutobi Sasuke
- Les Misérables (1992)
- Monsters, Inc. - Henry J. Waternoose III (Classical Arabic version)
- The Men of Angelos
- The Mysterious Cities of Gold
- The New Adventures of Gigantor
- Ohayō! Spank
- Planes - Chug
- Planes: Fire & Rescue - Chug
- Plawres Sanshiro
- The Powerpuff Girls - Mojo Jojo (Image Production House version)
- The Powerpuff Girls (2016 TV series) - Mojo Jojo
- Prophet Joseph - Amenhotep III
- Ratatouille - Auguste Gusteau (Classical Arabic version)
- Rated A for Awesome - Max Awesome
- Robin Hood (1973 film) - Friar Tuck (Classical Arabic version)
- Saint Mary
- Salad Juyushi Tomatoman
- Thumbelina: A Magical Story
- Time Travel Tondekeman
- Tokimeki Tonight - Mori Eto (Ranze's father)
- Tom and Jerry Tales - Spike
- Treasure Planet - Mr. Arrow (Classical Arabic version)
- Up (2009 film) - Gamma (Classical Arabic version)
- Xiaolin Showdown - Dojo Kanojo Cho
- Thomas & Friends
