= Ajyal (TV series) =

Lebanese soap opera

- أجيال
- Genre: Drama Series
- Created by: Claudia Marchalian
- Starring: Ward el Khal; Youssef el Khal; Nadine Nassib Njeim; Pamela El Kik; Youssef Haddad; Carlos Azar; Rita Barsona
- Opening theme: Drama
- Country of origin: Lebanon
- Original language: Arabic
- No. of seasons: 2
- No. of episodes: 70

Production
- Executive producer: Claudia Marchalian
- Running time: approx. 45 minutes
- Production company: Marwa Group

Original release
- Network: Murr TV
- Release: 2010 – present

Ajyal (Arabic: أجيال, lit. 'Generations') is a Lebanese soap opera. Season 1 was broadcast on Murr Television in Autumn 2010, with the final and second series airing during Summer 2012.

== Plot ==
=== Season 1 ===
The show centers on the residents of a private compound. Farah (Nadine Nassib Njeim), widowed in the Lebanese civil war, is raising her three children. She meets a young man named Theo (Youssef El Khal) through work, who falls in love with her. Farah faces conflict from Theo and her son who refuses to allow her to move on after her husband's death. Nayla (Ward El Khal) has two children from her ex-husband Doumet (Majdi Machmouchi) and is in a relationship with the compound pool lifeguard Serge (Carlos Azar). All seemed calm until her ex-husband was released from prison and tried to rejoin her life. Doumet threatens to kill Nayla's boyfriend but the couple remains together. The sisters Tamara (Pamela El Kik) and Mira (Dalida Khalil) live alone in the GF apartment. The two girls have opposite personalities; Mira is a very calm girl who entered medical school and fell for her teacher Roger (Youssef Haddad), while Tamara is a troubled girl who has mood swings because of a childhood trauma. Tamara is not sure about her sexual orientation; she cares for Amelia, (Carla Boutros) and Nour (Issam Braidy). She is protective of her cousin Chahid (Tarek Yaacoub) especially after discovering that he is in love with a girl who worships demons and that he is having a baby with her. Tamara manages to save the child but he dies in her arms a week later which reminds her of her brother's death.

Chahid's sister Roula (Joelle Dagher) was married against her will to an elderly man, Raif (Jihad Al-Atrash), who left his wife Hekmat (Waddad Jabbour) to marry a young girl. She is having an affair with Maher (Wissam Hanna) who lives with his family in the compound. When Roula's husband discovers this, he first imprisons her in the house but she is then freed by her friends and asks for a divorce. Maher's mother Inass (Soha Kikano), ashamed of her son having an affair with a married woman, fights with him, leaves the house, and travels to Iraq to see her parents, leaving him and his sister Abir (Lisa Debs) alone. Rita (Rita Barsona) and Johnny (Wajih Sakr) are another couple in the compound, after trying insemination several times they lose faith in having a child.

Rita's niece came to spend the summer with her aunt and falls in love with Serge. When she finds that he is in a relationship with Nayla, she accuses him of raping her and throws herself from the balcony after she finds out that no one believed her. In the season's finale a big fire surprises the neighbours at the wedding of Mira and Roger and leads to a big panic.

== International release ==
Country	Channel	Series premiere	Language	Title	English meaning generations
Lebanon	MTV Lebanon	October, 2010	Arabic	Ajyal	Season 1
Lebanon	MTV Lebanon	July, 2012	Arabic	Ajyal	Season 2
