= List of Craig of the Creek episodes =

Craig of the Creek is an American animated sitcom created by Matt Burnett and Ben Levin for Cartoon Network. The show's pilot episode premiered on the Cartoon Network app on December 1, 2017, and the first episode of its first season ("Itch to Explore") was previewed there on February 19, 2018, before officially premiering on Cartoon Network on March 30 of that year, alongside its second episode ("You're It"). The season consisted of 40 episodes of 11 minutes each and concluded on March 11, 2019.

The second season ran from March 18, 2019, until June 11, 2020, and totaled 40 episodes, of which two ("The Other Side" and "Craig and the Kid's Table") are double-length. The third season premiered with a double-length episode ("The Other Side: The Tournament") on June 21, 2020. The fourth season premiered with a special episode ("The Legend of the Library"). During the course of the series, 180 episodes of Craig of the Creek aired over six seasons, between March 30, 2018, and January 25, 2025. Additionally, five shorts were aired in late 2019.

== Series overview ==
Season	Episodes	Originally released	
Season	Episodes	First released	Last released
Pilot		December 1, 2017	
1	40	March 30, 2018	March 11, 2019
2	40	March 18, 2019	June 11, 2020
Shorts	5	November 22, 2019	December 13, 2019
3	40	June 21, 2020	July 2, 2021
4	40	October 25, 2021	May 29, 2023
5	10	July 10, 2023	July 14, 2023
Film		December 11, 2023	
6	10	June 1, 2024	January 25, 2025

== Episodes ==
=== Pilot (2017) ===
Title	Directed by	Written and storyboarded by	Original release date	Prod. code
"Craig of the Creek"	Nick Cross (art); Robert Alvarez (animation)	Matt Burnett & Ben Levin	December 1, 2017 (CN App)	1044-00
Craig drops his staff into the sewers after getting distracted by his older brother, Bernard, and his girlfriend, Alexis. He teams up with his best friends Kelsey and J.P. and ventures to the Creek to look for it, encountering other strange and wild kids along the way.

=== Season 1 (2018–19) ===
No. overall	No. in season	Title	Written and storyboarded by	Story by	Original release date	Prod. code	US viewers (millions)
1	1	"Itch to Explore"	Madeline Queripel	Matt Burnett & Ben Levin	March 30, 2018 (Note: This episode was first released online on February 19, 2018.)	1059-002	0.826
Discovering that there's an unmapped part of the Creek in the center of the Poison Ivy Grove, Craig sets out to discover what waits for him there and become a legend among his peers, only to realize something is stalking him through the ivy.
2	2	"You're It"	Matt Burnett & Ben Levin	Matt Burnett & Ben Levin	March 30, 2018 (Note: This episode was first released online on March 9, 2018.)	1059-001	0.826
While out playing at the soda bottle races, the Creek Kids are terrorized by a years-long running game of tag. Kelsey is its latest victim and Craig and J.P. resolve to have Kelsey tag someone worthy of carrying the burden. However, Kelsey's too honorable to have someone suffer her fate and threatens to leave the Creek for good.
3	3	"Jessica Goes to the Creek"	Tiffany Ford & Michelle Xin	Matt Burnett, Ben Levin & Stu Livingston	March 31, 2018	1059-003	0.673
When Craig and Jessica are locked out of the house, Craig has no choice but to bring his little sister to the Creek where he, Kelsey and J.P. have been trying to draw up plans to defend their stump, but Jessica insists that she stick to her schedule. Meanwhile, Jason wants revenge on Craig and his friends for taking the last of the Scouts favorite snacks from the Trading Tree.
4	4	"The Final Book"	Carmen Liang & Charmaine Verhagen	Matt Burnett & Ben Levin	March 31, 2018	1059-005	0.792
The last book of Kelsey's favorite fantasy series, Ythrith of Scriggth, goes missing from the library, so Craig decides to help her solve the mystery of who took it. The Stump Kids seemingly hit a dead end, until a book Craig himself has been reading gives him the answers he needs.
5	5	"Too Many Treasures"	Katie Aldworth & Jason Dwyer	Matt Burnett, Ben Levin & Jeff Trammell	March 31, 2018	1059-004	0.853
Craig cannot stop collecting junk which he deems as treasure. His mother insists that he picks things he "wants" and things he "needs". Soon, Craig's put to the challenge when he must get a replacement part for the stump and enlists the bike riding 10 Speeds to take him to the legendary Junk Pile where he encounters the Junk Lord.
6	6	"Wildernessa"	Dashawn Mahone & Najja Porter	Demi Adejuyigbe, Matt Burnett, Ben Levin, Shauna McGarry & Jeff Trammell	April 2, 2018 (Note: This episode was first released online on March 30, 2018.)	1059-006	0.897
Due to what was perceived as improperly taking care of a turtle, Craig and his friends are visited by Wildernessa and her Tibetan Mastiff, Cheesesticks, who teach them to properly care for animals. Inspired, Kelsey takes up the cause, but realizes that she may be in over her head.
7	7	"Sunday Clothes"	Deena Beck & Angel Lorenzana	Matt Burnett, Ben Levin, Stu Livingston, Shauna McGarry & Jeff Trammell	April 6, 2018	1059-007	0.678
J.P. has a terrible habit of dirtying his clothes and his sister, Laura, tells him he should be more cautious about where he goes and what he does. With all of his clothes in the wash, J.P. decides to wear his Sunday clothes, forcing Craig and Kelsey to keep him clean.
8	8	"Escape from Family Dinner"	Tiffany Ford & Michael Yates	Matt Burnett, Ben Levin, Stu Livingston, Shauna McGarry & Jeff Trammell	April 9, 2018 (Note: This episode was first released online on April 6, 2018.)	1059-008	0.667
While doing advanced math homework, Craig learns that there is an epic water balloon fight at the Creek. Unfortunately, his parents have decided to have a barbecue dinner and Craig is forced to stay. He tries to find a way to get out, but none of his plans seem to work and he feels overwhelmed.
9	9	"Monster in the Garden"	Lamar Abrams & Jeff Liu	Matt Burnett, Ben Levin, Stu Livingston, Shauna McGarry & Jeff Trammell	April 13, 2018	1059-009	0.735
Craig, Bernard and Jessica are dropped off at their grandparents for the weekend. Grandpa Earl tells Craig about a mysterious creature that breaks into his garden and is eating his vegetables. Craig then resolves to capture this "Vegan Werewolf" by any means necessary.
10	10	"The Curse"	Danny Kilgore & Charmaine Verhagen	Matt Burnett, Kate Leth & Ben Levin	April 16, 2018	1059-010	0.574
The Stump Kids discover that someone is using their stump for witchcraft. They discover the witches (who are really two goth teens named Tabitha and Courtney) who amused by their misconception decide to "curse" them. After receiving a string of bad luck, the trio decide to get the "witches" to undo the curse.
11	11	"Dog Decider"	Deena Beck & Angel Lorenzana	Matt Burnett, Ben Levin, Shauna McGarry & Jeff Trammell	April 20, 2018	1059-012	0.652
With his fear of making decisions, Craig decides to join the Fredites, a cult that worship a dog named Fred for his supposed decision making abilities. Craig comes to rely on Fred, which annoys Kelsey, but when he decides to stray from the dog's decision, Fred disappears and the Fredites blame Craig.
12	12	"Bring Out Your Beast"	Jason Dwyer & Tiffany Ford	Matt Burnett & Ben Levin	April 23, 2018 (Note: This episode was first released online on April 20, 2018.)	1059-013	0.508
Craig wants to play a card game called Bring Out Your Beast. He decides to take Bernard's vintage card collection, due to him not playing it anymore, to play and discovers the powerful Beast Snare card. Due to its infamy, Craig tries to get rid of it, but someone ends up taking it and using it to steal other players' cards.
13	13	"Lost in the Sewers"	Jon Feria & Mark Galez	Matt Burnett, Ben Levin, Stu Livingston, Dashawn Mahone, Shauna McGarry, Najja Porter & Jeff Trammell	April 27, 2018	1059-014	0.666
The Stump Kids head to the sewers at the request of the Sewer Queen to chart a map for it. When the Sewer Queen is washed away by a flood, Craig decides to take the lead in finding her and getting out. However, Craig is really bad at directions as the team gets lost in their maze-like predicament.
14	14	"The Future is Cardboard"	Dashawn Mahone & Najja Porter	Matt Burnett, Ben Levin, Stu Livingston, Dashawn Mahone, Shauna McGarry, Najja Porter & Jeff Trammell	April 30, 2018	1059-011	0.494
Craig and his friends meet Carter Brown, an eccentric cardboard connoisseur who admires Craig's cardboard making skills and asks him to join his project in making New Cardboard City mobile. When Kelsey and J.P. leave due to frustration, they come across another cardboard city who know of Carter and his dangerous ideas.
15	15	"The Brood"	Kris Mukai & Charmaine Verhagen	Matt Burnett, Ben Levin, Stu Livingston, Shauna McGarry & Jeff Trammell	May 7, 2018	1059-015	0.566
Craig's Granddad tells him about cicada swarms in Maryland, and how he collects the shells every swarm. After accidentally destroying his cicada shell, Craig, Kelsey and J.P. get another shell, but end up trapped in their stump when a cicada swarm forces them to stay for shelter.
16	16	"Under the Overpass"	Dashawn Mahone & Najja Porter	Matt Burnett, Ben Levin, Stu Livingston, Dashawn Mahone, Shauna McGarry, Najja Porter & Jeff Trammell	July 9, 2018 (Note: This episode was first released online on July 6, 2018.)	1059-016	0.434
Craig discovers a honeysuckle that Kit states is very valuable at the Trading Tree. Craig and his friends venture to where the plant came from: a honeysuckle bush that is directly behind an overpass full of strange markings. However, Craig and his friends come in conflict with a mysterious hooded archer guarding the overpass who wants them gone.
17	17	"The Invitation"	Deena Beck & Angel Lorenzana	Matt Burnett, Kate Leth, Ben Levin, Stu Livingston, Shauna McGarry & Jeff Trammell	July 9, 2018	1059-017	0.491
Craig and his friends are invited by the Tea Timers to an exclusive party along with Mackenzie, Handlebarb and the Junior Forest Scouts to try Tiramisu. However, the contrast between the guests erupts as they are slowly kicked out of the party before the cake is served, which Craig suspects is part of the Timers' intent.
18	18	"Vulture's Nest"	Jason Dwyer & Tiffany Ford	Matt Burnett, Tiffany Ford, Ben Levin, Stu Livingston, Shauna McGarry & Jeff Trammell	July 9, 2018	1059-018	0.611
Craig and his friends meet the garage band Bad Moves who teach them to be a rock band. Craig continues to have a nightmare about an incident with a vulture in an abandoned barn, but tries to overcome it when Bad Moves gets kicked out of their garage and he suggests that they have their concert in the barn.
19	19	"Kelsey Quest"	Katie Aldworth & Niki Yang	Matt Burnett, Ben Levin, Shauna McGarry & Jeff Trammell	July 9, 2018	1059-019	0.698
The Elders of the Creek have had their precious sword stolen by a boy named Jerry, so Kelsey takes it upon herself to get it back. She continues to train harder than she has ever trained before, until J.P. suggests that her opponent is also powerful causing Kelsey to feel insecure about her abilities.
20	20	"Jpony"	Angel Lorenzana & Charmaine Verhagen	Matt Burnett, Jason Dwyer, Tiffany Ford, Ben Levin, Shauna McGarry, Jeff Trammell & Charmaine Verhagen	July 9, 2018	1059-020	0.648
Maney of the Horse Girls invites J.P. to be a horse with them due to having a crush on him. He accepts even though he is clearly out of sync with the rest who nevertheless find his antics charming. This causes the Horse Girls' leader, Mackenzie, to plot a way for J.P. to get kicked out.
21	21	"Ace of Squares"	Dashawn Mahone & Najja Porter	Matt Burnett, Ben Levin, Dashawn Mahone, Shauna McGarry, Najja Porter, Jeff Trammell & Zachary Scheer	August 27, 2018 (Note: This episode was first released online on August 17, 2018.)	1059-021	0.560
Craig decides to take on Toman, the master of four square who is notorious for altering the rules of the game. Craig is successful at defeating him, but realizes that there is a heavy burden that comes with it as everyone at the Creek desperately seeks to take the title of Ace from Craig who becomes mad with power.
22	22	"Doorway to Helen"	Deena Beck & Angel Lorenzana	Matt Burnett, Ben Levin, Dashawn Mahone, Shauna McGarry, Najja Porter, Zachary Scheer & Jeff Trammell	August 28, 2018	1059-023	0.488
Craig discovers a note belonging to a girl named Helen. Helen, much like Craig, loves the Creek and begins writing letters back and forth to him. After misinterpreting her explanation about homeschooling, they come to believe she lives in another dimension, so Craig and his friends resolve to create a "dimensional" portal to see her despite her reluctance.
23	23	"The Last Kid in the Creek"	Jason Dwyer & Tiffany Ford	Matt Burnett, Ben Levin, Shauna McGarry & Jeff Trammell	August 29, 2018	1059-022	0.538
Craig refuses to try any of the nasty or dirty snacks the Creek has to offer with kids labeling him a picky eater. However, the snacks combined with Kit's sudden cold, result in everyone getting sick minus Craig. Fearing a curse has befallen the Creek, leaving him as the only one there, Craig visits the "witches" Tabitha and Courtney for advice.
24	24	"The Climb"	Katie Aldworth & Malcolm Pryor	Matt Burnett, Ben Levin, Shauna McGarry & Jeff Trammell	August 30, 2018	1059-024	0.464
While trying to record a video of the entire Creek from above, Craig's cellphone ends up getting stuck in Mt. Sycamore, the tallest tree in the Creek. Craig gets advice from the Cliffs, a group of rock climbing teens, and Craig must learn to overcome his fear of heights.
25	25	"Big Pinchy"	Charmaine Verhagen & Niki Yang	Matt Burnett, Ben Levin, Shauna McGarry, Jeff Trammell & Niki Yang	August 31, 2018	1059-025	0.458
When Jason doubts J.P.'s story of Big Pinchy, the largest crayfish ever seen, J.P. leads Craig and Kelsey to the whereabouts of the titular creature. The pathway turns out to be harsher than what J.P. remembers, but Craig is willing to push on so as to prove Jason's doubts wrong.
26	26	"The Kid from 3030"	Dashawn Mahone & Najja Porter	Matt Burnett, Ben Levin, Stu Livingston, Shauna McGarry & Jeff Trammell	October 1, 2018 (Note: This episode was first released online on September 28, 2018.)	1059-026	0.447
The Stump Kids encounter a robot boy named Deltron (Del the Funky Homosapien) who claims to be from the year 3030 where his robot superiors are oppressive against his kind. Deltron asks for the gang's help in getting more music to power him and save the future.: Special guest star: Del the Funky Homosapien as Deltron
27	27	"Power Punchers"	Jason Dwyer & Tiffany Ford	Lamar Abrams, Matt Burnett, Ben Levin, Shauna McGarry & Jeff Trammell	October 2, 2018	1059-027	0.521
Craig is tired of losing to his dad, Duane, at the game Power Punchers. He ends up getting help from David of the Elders of the Creek in learning how to master his favorite character, Admiral Anchor. However, Duane begins to pick up on Craig's sudden improvement of his skills and challenges him to a rematch.
28	28	"Creek Cart Racers"	Deena Beck & Angel Lorenzana	Matt Burnett, Ben Levin, Shauna McGarry & Jeff Trammell	October 3, 2018	1059-028	0.493
Sailor Boy announces a race with the winner being allowed to enter his backyard pool with the Tea Timers, Jason and Cannonball entering. Craig and his friends join and build a car with the help of Junk Lord, but when Craig skins his knee, J.P. must take over.
29	29	"Secret Book Club"	Katie Aldworth & Aleth Romanillos	Katie Aldworth, Matt Burnett, Ben Levin, Shauna McGarry & Jeff Trammell	October 4, 2018	1059-029	0.494
Kelsey tries to get Craig and J.P. interested in the fantasy book Baronica and the Time Spoon, so she and Stacks create a secret book club so that they can read it together. Things however get complicated when Craig tries to keep the secret book club a secret from outsiders.
30	30	"Jextra Perrestrial"	Charmaine Verhagen & Niki Yang	Lamar Abrams, Matt Burnett, Ben Levin, Shauna McGarry & Jeff Trammell	November 5, 2018 (Note: This episode was first released online on November 2, 2018.)	1059-030	0.491
After misinterpreting his sister's comments, J.P. is under the belief that he is an alien from another planet and Craig and Kelsey decide to help him "make contact" with his "family". However, the Junior Forest Scouts decide that they want to kidnap J.P. for the government.
31	31	"The Takeout Mission"	Dashawn Mahone & Najja Porter	Matt Burnett, Ben Levin, Shauna McGarry & Jeff Trammell	November 6, 2018	1059-031	0.510
On a particularly rainy day, Kelsey's father tasks her, Craig and J.P. with ordering food. They decide on Thai, but due to the weather, they can only order take out instead of delivery. The kids decide to venture out into the rain and try to be responsible despite their age.
32	32	"Dinner at the Creek"	Deena Beck & Angel Lorenzana	Matt Burnett, Ben Levin, Shauna McGarry & Jeff Trammell	November 7, 2018	1059-033	0.535
Bernard and Alexis are left in charge for the evening, much to Craig's consternation. Not wanting to try what they are preparing for dinner, Craig heads to the Creek with Kelsey and J.P. and decide to "live off the land". However, this ends up being easier said then done.
33	33	"Jessica's Trail"	Jason Dwyer & Tiffany Ford	Matt Burnett, Ben Levin, Shauna McGarry & Jeff Trammell	November 8, 2018	1059-032	0.632
While Nicole is getting errands done, Jessica wanders into an unfamiliar territory with Craig following in pursuit. He comes across the Honeysuckle Rangers who help him look for her, but he slowly begins to suspect that they want his map of the Creek for sinister purposes.
34	34	"Bug City"	Katie Aldworth & Drew Green	Deena Beck, Matt Burnett, Ben Levin, Shauna McGarry, Shakira Pressley & Jeff Trammell	January 28, 2019 (Note: This episode was first released online on December 13, 2018.)	1059-034	0.492
Craig and his friends discover a large quantity of bugs and decide to care for them by creating a Bug City. Craig suddenly begins becoming possessive of them due to outside elements, such as Mortimor, terrorizing them and decides to take extra precaution by "protecting" them.
35	35	"Deep Creek Salvage"	Dashawn Mahone & Najja Porter	Matt Burnett, Ben Levin, Dashawn Mahone, Shauna McGarry, Najja Porter & Jeff Trammell	February 4, 2019	1059-036	0.474
While complaining about having to clean his room, the Stump Kids believe that they have spotted a gold bar in the Creek. Due to all the garbage that has filled up the area, the trio build a contraption to pull out the gold bar as they all fantasize about what they will do with their share of the treasure.
36	36	"The Shortcut"	Charmaine Verhagen & Niki Yang	Matt Burnett, Ben Levin, Shauna McGarry & Jeff Trammell	February 11, 2019	1059-035	0.460
During a heatwave, all the ice pops at the Trading Tree have melted. Craig and Kit head off to search for the latter's supplier and run afoul of a bridge troll that tells simple, yet undecipherable riddles. Meanwhile, Kelsey and J.P. must run the Trading Tree, but their personalities make it difficult to run the business properly.
37	37	"Dibs Court"	Jason Dwyer & Tiffany Ford	Matt Burnett, Ben Levin, Dashawn Mahone, Shauna McGarry, Najja Porter & Jeff Trammell	February 18, 2019	1059-037	0.545
Craig and his friends return to the Stump only to discover a boy named Richard who claims that he called dibs on the spot. When Mark of the Elders confirms the claims, the Stump Kids take him to Dibs Court to argue ownership. However, they cannot seem to argue against Richard's simple claim of calling dibs on the Stump.
38	38	"The Great Fossil Rush"	Deena Beck & Angel Lorenzana	Deena Beck, Matt Burnett, Ben Levin, Angel Lorenzana & Jeff Trammell	February 25, 2019	1059-038	0.381
When J.P. finds a fossil at the Creek, everyone begins digging in the hopes of becoming "rich". Jason becomes more bossy than ever when he insists that he knows better on how to dig and look for fossils. When the Stump Kids arrive the next day, they discover that the Creek is dried up due to Jason's efforts in an attempt to get respect.
39	39	"The Mystery of the Timekeeper"	Jason Dwyer & Tiffany Ford	Matt Burnett, Ben Levin, Shakira Pressley, Zachary Scheer & Jeff Trammell	March 4, 2019	1071-042	0.415
The Timekeeper accidentally forgets daylight saving time and the kids all end up getting home late for dinner. Craig and his friends discover the Timekeeper missing and decide to take turns replacing her for the next couple of days. When they realize how difficult and boring it is to keep up with the time, the Stump Kids decide to go look for her.
40	40	"Alone Quest"	Katie Aldworth & Drew Green	Katie Aldworth, Matt Burnett, Ben Levin & Jeff Trammell	March 11, 2019	1059-039	0.414
While playing charades at the Stump, Craig suddenly has a bathroom emergency and he and J.P. take off to go and find the nearest restroom, but run into various obstacles along the way. Meanwhile, Kelsey decides to spend some alone time, albeit with Mortimor, and performs various personal tasks in total bliss.

=== Season 2 (2019–20) ===
No. overall	No. in season	Title	Written and storyboarded by	Story by	Original release date	Prod. code	US viewers (millions)
41	1	"Memories of Bobby"	Charmaine Verhagen & Niki Yang	Matt Burnett, Ben Levin, Dashawn Mahone, Shauna McGarry, Najja Porter & Jeff Trammell	March 18, 2019	1059-040	0.477
The candy-loving Bobby is moving away, though to the Creek Kids it is the equivalent of dying. As the Stump Kids "mourn", they decide to recollect on classic moments that have happened with Bobby. However, the more they talk about him, the more they realize that they never really hung out with him and become saddened with the thought of not knowing him.
42	2	"Jacob of the Creek"	Dashawn Mahone & Najja Porter	Lamar Abrams, Matt Burnett, Ben Levin, Shakira Pressley & Jeff Trammell	March 18, 2019	1071-041	0.477
Craig has grown his hair out as an afro, but it causes problems. With no other choice, he gives himself a really bad haircut. He and his friends decide to build a time machine to fix his mistake, but everyone at the Creek thinks he is a really cool kid named Jacob. With everyone treating him nicely, Craig begins to ignore Kelsey and J.P.
43	3	"Return of the Honeysuckle Rangers"	Deena Beck & Angel Lorenzana	Matt Burnett, Ben Levin & Jeff Trammell	March 25, 2019	1071-043	0.355
Craig learns from Bobby that the Honeysuckle Rangers have invaded his side of the Creek to get his map. After meeting with the Green Poncho, Craig decides to create a fake map for the Rangers to get. When he gives them the wrong one, he and his friends set out to retrieve it and Craig discovers something personal about them.
44	4	"Kelsey the Elder"	Katie Aldworth & Ashley Tahilan	Matt Burnett, Ben Levin & Jeff Trammell	April 1, 2019	1071-045	0.427
When Barry quits the Elders' campaign due to Mark's unfairness, Kelsey joins and learns that he has no place for her creativity. Barry starts hanging out with Craig and J.P., but he only seems to talk about older Cartoon Network shows. The Stump Kids decide to try to bring the Elders back together again.
45	5	"Sour Candy Trials"	Dashawn Mahone & Najja Porter	Matt Burnett, Ben Levin & Jeff Trammell	April 1, 2019	1071-046	0.427
Craig decides to take on the Sucker Pucker Challenge by sucking on a sour lemon candy without chewing. To get through it, Craig gets spiritual help from his family who tell him never to give up. However, Big Red, the previous record holder, will stop at nothing to make sure that Craig loses the challenge and retain her place.
46	6	"Fort Williams"	Lamar Abrams & Charmaine Verhagen	Lamar Abrams, Matt Burnett, Ben Levin, Shakira Pressley & Jeff Trammell	May 11, 2019	1071-044	0.341
Craig gets pink eye and has to stay at home until it heals. While Duane, Bernard and Jessica head out to the museum, Nicole suggests that she and Craig build a pillow fort. They expand on it and have it spread throughout the house. As the day goes on, Craig realizes that he does not want the day with mom to end.
47 48	7 8	"The Other Side"	Jason Dwyer, Tiffany Ford, Dashawn Mahone & Najja Porter	Matt Burnett, Ben Levin, Dashawn Mahone, Najja Porter & Jeff Trammell	June 22, 2019	1071-051 1071-052	0.378
At the beginning of summer, the Stump Kids decide to make the Green Poncho their friend by giving him an ice pop and offer to guard the overpass while he takes the day off at the fair. Things immediately get out of hand when the Honeysuckle Rangers make off with Craig's map to give to their king. The Green Poncho disguises them so that they can enter the Other Side and retrieve their map. As the Stump Kids make their way into foreign territory, they become witnesses to a new foe and earn new allies.
49	9	"Summer Wish"	Katie Aldworth & Ashley Tahilan	Matt Burnett, Jason Dwyer, Tiffany Ford, Ben Levin, Ashley Tahilan & Jeff Trammell	June 29, 2019 (Note: This episode was first released online on June 21, 2019.)	1071-050	0.422
It is the first day of summer and the Creek Kids celebrate with the annual fire fly wishing. After realizing that summer is short, Craig decides to keep a fire fly to make a wish later. However, this ends up throwing the balance of summer out of whack and making him sick, forcing him to make a wish soon.
50	10	"Turning the Tables"	Deena Beck & Angel Lorenzana	Matt Burnett, Ben Levin, Dashawn Mahone, Najja Porter & Jeff Trammell	July 6, 2019	1071-053	0.293
When Bernard messes up the bathroom Craig just cleaned, Craig decides to have his revenge by having himself, Kelsey and J.P. go to his summer job at Pasta La Vista and being rowdy customers. When a rude man comes in that makes Bernard and Alexis feel miserable, Craig begins to feel guilty about his behavior.
51	11	"Kelsey the Author"	Katie Aldworth & Ashley Tahilan	Matt Burnett, Ben Levin & Jeff Trammell	July 13, 2019	1071-055	0.326
Kelsey finally finishes her novel Robyn and the Snow Sword. She decides to have it be a real book, so she, Craig, J.P. and Stacks create numerous copies and have them secretly spread around the library. When Kelsey overhears someone say they did not like it, she decides to have all her books destroyed.
52	12	"Council of the Creek"	Jason Dwyer & Tiffany Ford	Matt Burnett, Jason Dwyer, Tiffany Ford, Ben Levin & Jeff Trammell	July 20, 2019	1071-047	0.335
The Creek Kids start playing the circle game, which quickly begins to annoy everyone. Inspired by Bernard, Craig forms the Council of the Creek which consists of the leaders of the major factions (and Bobby). Everyone agrees to altering the circle game except Paintball Mike who likes it the way it is.
53	13	"Sparkle Cadet"	Deena Beck & Angel Lorenzana	Lamar Abrams, Matt Burnett, Ben Levin, Angel Lorenzana, Shakira Pressley & Jeff Trammell	July 27, 2019	1071-048	0.396
Kelsey arrives at the stump feeling miserable and dirty when she, Craig and J.P. are greeted by Sparkle Cadet, a magical girl who decides to help them try to remove Kelsey's negativity. Throughout the day, Kelsey refuses to talk about what had happened to her while Sparkle Cadet tries to teach her to be optimistic.
54	14	"Cousin of the Creek"	Dashawn Mahone & Najja Porter	Matt Burnett, Ben Levin, Dashawn Mahone, Najja Porter & Jeff Trammell	August 3, 2019	1071-056	0.348
Craig's extended family from out of town come to visit. He wants to spend time with his cousin Bryson, but things become awkward between them. They resolve to head to the Creek for some fun and get caught up in a water balloon war. Meanwhile, Duane becomes envious of his brother Darnell when Jessica becomes more impressed with him.
55	15	"Camper on the Run"	Annisa Adjani & Charmaine Verhagen	Matt Burnett, Ben Levin, Zachary Scheer, Jeff Trammell & Charmaine Verhagen	August 10, 2019 (Note: This episode was first released online on August 2, 2019.)	1071-054	0.442
The Stump Kids meet Roxie, a girl who escaped Sleepaway Camp after all the "terrible" things that have been happening to her there. The kids do everything they can to help her until Craig meets Shannon, the camp counselor, and learns that everything Roxie told them has been a lie, putting him, Kelsey, Mortimor and J.P. in danger.
56	16	"Stink Bomb"	Drew Green & Charmaine Verhagen	Lamar Abrams, Matt Burnett, Ben Levin, Shakira Pressley & Jeff Trammell	August 17, 2019	1071-049	0.492
While showing off her own personal anti-bug spray, Wren accidentally releases a stink bomb that coats a large portion of the Creek. Craig and his friends must venture into the stinky landscape to rescue everyone, but the situation worsens when Wren's cohorts attempt to clear the air and end up increasing the stench endangering everyone.
57	17	"The Evolution of Craig"	Katie Aldworth & Ashley Tahilan	Matt Burnett, Jason Dwyer, Ben Levin, Shakira Pressley & Jeff Trammell	August 24, 2019	1071-060	0.506
As Craig prepares for 5th grade, he discovers a tadpole and decides to raise it into a frog. Parodying the Pokémon franchise, Craig tries to level him up while also coming to grips with the fact that since he is growing up in life, he will need to decide what will become of him as he is afraid of turning into someone like Bernard.
58	18	"The Haunted Dollhouse"	Tiffany Ford & Charmaine Verhagen	Matt Burnett, Ben Levin & Jeff Trammell	October 26, 2019	1071-065	0.461
The Stump Kids discover a dollhouse with a little doll inside, but leave it, only to find it following them back to their hideout. They enlist the aid of the Witches of the Creek and Stacks into finding out what the dollhouse wants from them. They learn that the dollhouse belonged to Arthur Rolly and try to make contact with him to end his haunting.
59 60	19 20	"Craig and the Kid's Table"	Tiffany Ford, Dashawn Mahone, Najja Porter & Charmaine Verhagen	Matt Burnett, Ben Levin, Dashawn Mahone, Najja Porter, Taneka Stotts & Jeff Trammell	November 23, 2019	1071-070HH	0.497
It is Leftovers Day at the Creek and Craig brings along his special leftovers to share along with a story relating to it. The Williams family gets together for Thanksgiving and Bernard is glad to finally be sitting at the adults table, only to get usurped by his college cousin Jasmine. While trying to prevent Craig, Bryson and Jessica from fooling around, Bernard accidentally destroys the sweet potato pie that their mother made. With no other choice, Bryson and Jessica do everything they can to distract the family while Craig and Bernard try to fix their mess.
61	21	"Creek Daycare"	Jason Dwyer & Tiffany Ford	Matt Burnett, Jason Dwyer, Tiffany Ford, Ben Levin & Jeff Trammell	April 18, 2020 (Note: This episode was first released online on December 13, 2019.)	1071-057	0.391
Jessica comes with Craig to hang out at the Creek. When she refuses to go grass sledding with him and his friends, he takes her to the Creek Daycare. The daycare's owner, Angel, steps out to help a child, leaving Jessica and the Stump Kids to look after the tiny tots. While Craig is having a hard time sitting them, Jessica gives him a lesson.
62	22	"Sugar Smugglers"	Deena Beck & Angel Lorenzana	Deena Beck, Matt Burnett, H. Michael Croner, Jason Dwyer, Ben Levin, Angel Lorenzana & Jeff Trammell	April 18, 2020 (Note: This episode was first released online on April 10, 2020.)	1071-058	0.397
The Honeysuckle Rangers come asking for help. Due to the King's hoarding of candy, they hired the Stump Kids to smuggle candy into the Other Side and make a speakeasy called the Candy Bar. However, the King's BFF Maya catches on to their scheme and begins to double down on security, forcing Craig and his friends to act fast.
63	23	"Sleepover at JP's"	Marie Lum & Charmaine Verhagen	Deena Beck, Matt Burnett, H. Michael Croner, Ben Levin & Jeff Trammell	April 25, 2020	1071-059	0.365
J.P. invites Craig and Kelsey over for a sleepover and late night watching. However, the Creek suddenly begins a game of flashlight tag, much to J.P.'s consternation. Despite having fun, J.P. wants to get back home in time not just for his show, but also to see his mom who is coming late. Things are complicated when they end up getting tagged.
64	24	"Tea Timer's Ball"	Dashawn Mahone & Najja Porter	Matt Burnett, Ben Levin, Dashawn Mahone, Najja Porter, Jeff Trammell & Charmaine Verhagen	April 25, 2020	1071-062	0.343
The Tea Timers throw a dance and invite everyone in the Creek. While J.P. and Maney get ready together, Craig believes that the party is a ruse to get back at him as revenge. Meanwhile, Aaron asks out Kelsey and she reluctantly accepts. While Aaron is nice, Kelsey does not want to hurt his feelings as she is not romantically in love with him.
65	25	"The Cardboard Identity"	Jason Dwyer & Kellye Perdue	Matt Burnett, Ben Levin & Jeff Trammell	May 2, 2020	1071-063	0.312
The Stump Kids come across an underground bunker made of cardboard, courtesy of Carter Brown. Recruiting Zoe, they head down and discover that Carter had been trying to make up for his past misdeeds by bettering himself. However, this involves transforming himself into a "card-borg" and attacks his former allies in an induced rage.
66	26	"Ancients of the Creek"	Deena Beck & Angel Lorenzana	Matt Burnett, Ben Levin, Edgar Momplaisir & Jeff Trammell	May 2, 2020	1071-064	0.361
While out with their usual exploring, the Stump Kids find a hidden underground bunker called Founder's Keep. They deduce that it belonged to the first group of kids to play in the Creek from as far back as 1976. As they find it strange that the kids would leave their things behind, Craig discovers a letter written in secret code that might explain their abandoned hideout.
67	27	"Mortimor to the Rescue"	Katie Aldworth & Ashley Tahilan	Matt Burnett, Ben Levin, Taneka Stotts & Jeff Trammell	May 9, 2020 (Note: This episode was first released online on May 1, 2020.)	1071-066	0.411
The Stump Kids decide to venture into the Algae Abyss, but lose their paddle and get stuck there. Kelsey sends Mortimor to get help as he flies throughout the Creek trying to look for someone who can help. Meanwhile the kids becomes desperate trying to get out of the swamp and Craig, in his madness, punctures a hole in the raft.
68	28	"Secret in a Bottle"	Jason Dwyer & Kellye Perdue	Matt Burnett, Ben Levin, Taneka Stotts & Jeff Trammell	May 9, 2020	1071-068	0.399
When Craig gets annoyed at how Kelsey and J.P. do not respect his things, he seeks out the Keeper of Secrets to have his secret about how they sometimes annoy him kept in his lair. A flood washes all the Creek Kids' secrets out. While the Stump Kids collect them all, Eliza finds one and threatens to have its secret read out loud at an auction.
69	29	"Trading Day"	Deena Beck & Angel Lorenzana	Matt Burnett, Ben Levin, Taneka Stotts & Jeff Trammell	May 16, 2020	1071-069	0.342
When Craig accidentally destroys Kit's entire supply of red velvet choco rolls, he has to pay her back by making trades for her throughout the day. First, he must sell some lame headgear, then get a certain sour snack from the Ninja Kids for the Elders and finally get a very bland granola bar from the Junk Lord, or rather his feral junk cats.
70	30	"Crisis at Elder Rock"	Katie Aldworth & Ashley Tahilan	Deena Beck, Matt Burnett, Ben Levin, Angel Lorenzana, Taneka Stotts & Jeff Trammell	May 16, 2020	1071-071	0.337
The Stump Kids head over to the Elder Rock to ask the Elders something, only to discover that they have been trapped underneath their rock for five days after their support gave way. Not wanting their parents to come, Craig and Kelsey try to free them while J.P. fills in at Mark's job. The Elders live stream their struggle as the Creek Kids all over watch them.
71	31	"Kelsey the Worthy"	Dashawn Mahone & Najja Porter	Matt Burnett, Ben Levin, Dashawn Mahone, Najja Porter, Taneka Stotts & Jeff Trammell	May 23, 2020	1071-072	0.357
While playing at Craig's house, Kelsey accidentally lodges her sword into the wall and destroys some of it. Her father, Neil, is upset and takes her sword away as punishment. To prove her "worthitude", Craig and J.P. put her through a series of hero trials to reclaim her sword. However, she soon learns that this is not enough to sway her father.
72	32	"The End Was Here"	Jason Dwyer & Drew Green	Matt Burnett, Ben Levin, Taneka Stotts & Jeff Trammell	May 23, 2020	1071-073	0.367
In trying to uncover what caused the Ancients of the Creek to disband, following a game of capture the flag, Craig realizes that their map perfectly lines up with his own and ventures with Kelsey and J.P. to look for the remainder of the old Creek. They believe to have found information, but in order to get it, they need to go to Jason's backyard.
73	33	"In the Key of the Creek"	Roan Helfer & Ashley Tahilan	Katie Aldworth, Matt Burnett, Ben Levin, Shakira Pressley, Zachary Scheer, Ashley Tahilan & Jeff Trammell	June 8, 2020 (Note: This episode was first released online on June 5, 2020.)	1071-081	0.408
In this musical episode, Craig is suffering from the indoor blues as it continues to rain; preventing him and his friends from going to the Creek. At his father's suggestion, Craig decides to invent an imaginary adventure for him and his friends where they find a mysterious key at the Creek and try to discover what it could lead to.
74	34	"The Children of the Dog"	Deena Beck & Angel Lorenzana	Matt Burnett, Jason Dwyer, Ben Levin, Angel Lorenzana, Taneka Stotts & Jeff Trammell	June 8, 2020	1071-074	0.388
Craig is jealous of the fact that Kelsey and J.P. have pets to call their own. Wanting a pet, he is approached by former Fredite Brigid to join her three-step-program of training so that he can own a dog. When nothing seems to be working out for him, the Stump Kids slowly begin to realize that Brigid is taking advantage of them by pampering her.
75	35	"Jessica Shorts"	Tiffany Ford & Charmaine Verhagen	Matt Burnett, Jason Dwyer, Ben Levin, Taneka Stotts & Jeff Trammell	June 9, 2020	1071-075	0.520
A series of shorts focusing on Jessica. "The Jessica & Small Uncle Show": Jessica entertains Craig with her show, "Operation: Jessica": Jessica gets Kelsey's sword back, "Power Punchers": Bernard trains Jessica in a video game, "Incisor Trading": Jessica tries losing her tooth to get sweets, "Payup!": Jessica takes the rules of a game too far.
76	36	"Ferret Quest"	Katie Aldworth & Ashley Tahilan	Matt Burnett, Tiffany Ford, Ben Levin, Zachary Scheer, Jeff Trammell & Charmaine Verhagen	June 9, 2020	1071-076	0.494
When a ferret is spotted in the Creek, Kelsey teams up with Stacks and Wildernessa to find it. However, Kelsey quickly becomes jealous when the two of them start becoming closer, leaving her feeling left out. Meanwhile, Craig wants to prove that he knows about animals to Wildernessa by creating elaborate traps for the ferret.
77	37	"Into the Overpast"	Dashawn Mahone & Najja Porter	Matt Burnett, Ben Levin, Dashawn Mahone, Najja Porter, Shakira Pressley, Zachary Scheer, Taneka Stotts & Jeff Trammell	June 10, 2020	1071-077	0.420
While trying to retrieve an arrow from the Other Side, Craig and the Green Poncho run into Maya and Craig finally learns the Green Poncho's backstory. His real name is Omar, he and Maya used to be best friends and the two of them were friends with the King named Xavier who pitted the two against one another to ensure their loyalty to him.
78	38	"The Time Capsule"	Lamar Abrams & Jason Dwyer	Matt Burnett, Ben Levin, Shakira Pressley, Zachary Scheer & Jeff Trammell	June 10, 2020	1071-078	0.422
Craig's mother tells him of his childhood that he does not remember. Feeling that he will forget things when he gets older, he, Kelsey and J.P. decide to convert their stump into a time capsule and have Bobby guard it for ten years. Craig's mother convinces him that he needs to create new memories regardless, but Bobby will not give the stump back.
79	39	"Beyond the Rapids"	Deena Beck & Angel Lorenzana	Matt Burnett, Ben Levin, Shakira Pressley, Zachary Scheer & Jeff Trammell	June 11, 2020	1071-079	0.324
Wren approaches the Stump Kids with an expedition to see why the salt levels have risen in the Creek; thinking that it could mean that the ocean is nearby. They head out down to the rapids, which no kid has ever crossed, and upon making it through, discover that a "creature" of some kind is following them through the water stream.
80	40	"The Jinxening"	Tiffany Ford & Charmaine Verhagen	Matt Burnett, Ben Levin, Dashawn Mahone, Najja Porter, Zachary Scheer & Jeff Trammell	June 11, 2020	1071-080	0.322
Craig, Kelsey, and J.P. help a kid named Paloma when they learn that she has been jinxed for an entire year after her friend had moved away. Angered over being ignored all this time, Paloma begins going all over the Creek jinxing everyone as revenge for choco-rolls. The only person who can defeat her is J.P. due to his unpredictable way of speaking.

=== Season 3 (2020–21) ===
No. overall	No. in season	Title	Written and storyboarded by	Story by	Original release date	Prod. code	US viewers (millions)
81 82	1 2	"The Other Side: The Tournament"	Angel Lorenzana, Dashawn Mahone, Najja Porter & Ashley Tahilan	Matt Burnett, Christina Catucci, Ben Levin, Mia Resella, Zachary Scheer & Jeff Trammell	June 21, 2020	1091-082 1091-083HH	0.234
It is Duane's birthday and the Williams family is doing everything they can to surprise him. Feeling that Bernard got a better gift for their father, Craig and his cousin Bryson head to the Creek to create a water cooling system for their friends. Craig notices that the Other Side is setting off fireworks and is informed by Omar the Green Poncho that King Xavier is holding a tournament to get rid of his old birthday gifts. Wanting to get one for his father, Craig and his friends venture over to win the tournament. While things seem smooth at first, the Stump Kids quickly find themselves in danger.
83	3	"The Ground is Lava!"	Lamar Abrams & Charmaine Verhagen	Matt Burnett, Christina Catucci, Ben Levin, Zachary Scheer & Jeff Trammell	June 29, 2020 (Note: This episode was first released online on June 26, 2020.)	1091-084	0.404
After Craig berates Jessica for her lack of "character design", Toman suddenly calls out a game of the ground is lava, forcing all the kids to rush to grounded objects for protection. Realizing that he left Jessica all alone at the Creek, the Stump Kids make a trek to reach her before the dinner horn, or worse, Jessica becomes a victim of the game.
84	4	"Council of the Creek: Operation Hive-Mind"	Deena Beck & Amish Kumar	Matt Burnett, Christina Catucci, Ben Levin, Zachary Scheer & Jeff Trammell	June 30, 2020	1091-085	0.375
In a parody of the Marvel Cinematic Universe, bees have suddenly taken over the Trading Tree. After getting stung, Craig is forced to once again reform the Council of the Creek. Things seem to be running smoothly when transferring the colony, until council member Bobby suddenly steals the bees for himself in an effort to procure honey from them.
85	5	"The Bike Thief"	Jason Dwyer & Roan Helfer	Matt Burnett, Christina Catucci, Ben Levin & Jeff Trammell	July 1, 2020	1091-086	0.429
On the day the 10 Speeds were supposed to hold a bike show, their bikes are suddenly stolen. Craig, feeling that he has an obligation to find them due to a childhood incident involving his own bike, sets off to look for them in a detective noir style scenario. Things come to a head when Craig realizes that there may be more than one culprit.
86	6	"Craig of the Beach"	Dashawn Mahone & Najja Porter	Matt Burnett, Christina Catucci, Tiffany Ford, Ben Levin, Zachary Scheer & Jeff Trammell	July 2, 2020	1091-087	0.406
Craig, Kelsey, J.P. and the Williams family, minus Bernard, all head to the beach for some fun. Craig starts to feel uncomfortable when his friends begin having more fun with his father Duane than with him. He intends to keep Kelsey and J.P. to himself when they discover a treasure map that could lead to buried treasure. Meanwhile, Jessica feeds the birds.
87	7	"Plush Kingdom"	Angel Lorenzana & Ashley Tahilan	Matt Burnett, Christina Catucci, Tiffany Ford, Ben Levin, Mia Resella, Zachary Scheer & Jeff Trammell	August 24, 2020 (Note: This episode was first released online on August 21, 2020.)	1091-088	0.298
The Stump Kids and Jessica take a vote and head into a cave where they encounter the Plush Kids; kids who have an entire collection of plush dolls. While Kelsey and J.P. take to their new surroundings, Craig finds the whole thing ridiculous. He soon discovers that the Plush Kids have a plan to make Jessica their new leader, permanently.
88	8	"The Ice Pop Trio"	Lamar Abrams & Charmaine Verhagen	Matt Burnett, Christina Catucci, Tiffany Ford, Ben Levin, Zachary Scheer & Jeff Trammell	August 25, 2020	1091-089	0.323
Most of the Creek Kids have gone for vacation and Craig finds himself without Kelsey and J.P. on a hot summer day. With Kit gone and no one to sell ice pops, Craig finds himself teaming up with Cannonball of the 10 Speeds and Sparkle Cadet in a quest to the Duck Mart to get ice pops; resulting in the three of them dubbing themselves the Ice Pop Trio.
89	9	"Pencil Break Mania"	Deena Beck & Amish Kumar	Matt Burnett, Christina Catucci, Ben Levin, Zachary Scheer & Jeff Trammell	August 26, 2020	1091-090	0.286
With Summer almost over, Craig learns that J.P. is a pro at pencil fighting, a sport that he abhors. When J.P. unwittingly beats the champion, he is approached by Nate Moger III who enters him into the pencil breaking championships to defend the title. When Moger proceeds to make it difficult for J.P., Craig becomes invested and starts supporting his friend.
90	10	"The Last Game of Summer"	Jason Dwyer & Roan Helfer	Matt Burnett, Christina Catucci, Tiffany Ford, Ben Levin, Zachary Scheer & Jeff Trammell	August 27, 2020	1091-091	0.340
On the solemn last day of summer, Stacks contacts the Stump Kids and she reveals that she has read through all of the Game Master's journals and discovered a clue that could lead to his forgotten treasure. The kids decide to discover it on their last day and must traverse through a series of underground traps and puzzles that test their abilities to find it.
91 92	11 12	"Trick or Creek"	Deena Beck, Jason Dwyer, Roan Helfer & Amish Kumar	Lamar Abrams, Matt Burnett, Tiffany Ford, Ben Levin, Ashley Tahilan, Jeff Trammell & Charmaine Verhagen	October 19, 2020 (Note: This episode was first released online on October 2, 2020.)	1091-095 1091-096	0.260
The Stump Kids learn from the Witches about the legend of No-Neck Natthew, a boy who ate popping candy and drank soda at the same time, causing his head to explode. Later, Kit collects on Creek Kids' candy debt, under threat of being banned from the Trading Tree. The Stump Kids, joined by Jessica, plan to trick-or-treat as much as possible to clear themselves, but must take a detour through the Creek, where No-Neck Natthew supposedly resides. Meanwhile, Bobby haunts an unprepared Duane, who quickly runs out of candy.: Note: This is a double-length episode.
93	13	"Fall Anthology"	Dashawn Mahone & Najja Porter	Matt Burnett, Christina Catucci, Jason Dwyer, Tiffany Ford, Ashleigh Hairston, Roan Helfer, Ben Levin, Jeff Trammell & Cody Ziglar	October 20, 2020 (Note: This episode was first released online on October 16, 2020.)	1091-092	0.304
Craig is assigned to create a poster on what Fall means to him. Thinking that Fall is boring, he gets support from his mother, Nicole, who asks him to talk about what he thinks of when it comes to Fall. Craig then proceeds to recall stories about, seasonal desserts, windy hills, moongazing, chapped lips and diving into a pile of leaves while adding to his poster of Fall.
94	14	"Afterschool Snackdown"	Angel Lorenzana & Ashley Tahilan	Matt Burnett, Tiffany Ford, Ashleigh Hairston, Christine Le, Ben Levin, Angel Lorenzana, Ashley Tahilan, Jeff Trammell & Cody Ziglar	October 21, 2020	1091-093	0.210
It is the Afterschool Snackdown at the Creek where Craig, Yustice, Angel, Sewer Queen, Faraday and Roger introduce a new snack to the judges, J.P., Kit and Toman to figure out which snack gets to be a delicacy for the Trading Tree for a whole month. While Craig is happy with his bug-like snacks, he becomes demoralized by everyone else's more imaginative dishes.
95	15	"Creature Feature"	Lamar Abrams & Charmaine Verhagen	Matt Burnett, Tiffany Ford, Ben Levin, Mia Resella & Jeff Trammell	October 22, 2020	1091-094	0.341
Craig accidentally watches a scary movie called "Swamp Monster from the Swamp" with Bernard and his friends, and he gets made fun of by Bernard for crying. The next day, the Stump Kids encounter the real life Swamp Monster and run home just as Bernard and his friends are watching another movie. The Swamp Monster invades the house as they try to defend themselves.
96	16	"King of Camping"	Dashawn Mahone & Najja Porter	Matt Burnett, Tiffany Ford, Ben Levin, Jeff Trammell & Cody Ziglar	October 23, 2020	1091-097	0.209
When Duane forgets the trailer for his children's camping trip, he suddenly gets a surprise visit from his brother Darnell, who is camping in a high tech RV he rented along with his children. Wanting to keep his title as "The King of Camping", Duane takes Craig and Bryson out to show how to camp properly while the rest have trouble using the modern amenities.: Note: This episode was dedicated to the memory of Kiersten Harris, who provided three voice-works for the series, who passed away due to the brain tumor in May 2020.
97	17	"The Rise and Fall of the Green Poncho"	Angel Lorenzana & Ashley Tahilan	Matt Burnett, Christina Catucci, Tiffany Ford, Ben Levin, Dashawn Mahone, Najja Porter, Zachary Scheer & Jeff Trammell	December 28, 2020	1091-098	0.221
The Stump Kids invite the rest of the Council to meet Omar the Green Poncho. He in turn reveals his origin story of when he teamed up with the original Green Poncho, Michelle Green, and trained under her tutelage to protect the Overpass. Omar, still wanting to be friends with Maya, attempts to reconnect with her, but King Xavier reveals something about Michelle that ruins her.
98	18	"I Don't Need a Hat"	Lamar Abrams & Charmaine Verhagen	Lamar Abrams, Matt Burnett, Tiffany Ford, Ben Levin, Jeff Trammell & Charmaine Verhagen	December 29, 2020	1091-099	0.254
It is a chilly day at the Creek, which means that Craig's mom must force him to wear his winter gear. Not wanting to wear something that he finds constrictive, Craig slowly begins to remove every important article of clothing that is keeping him warm. When it is time to go home for dinner, Craig must rush through the Creek to find his winter gear before he freezes.
99	19	"Alternate Creekiverse"	Deena Beck & Amish Kumar	Lamar Abrams, Matt Burnett, Tiffany Ford, Ashleigh Hairston, Ben Levin, Jeff Trammell, Charmaine Verhagen & Cody Ziglar	December 30, 2020	1091-100	0.281
The Stump Kids imagine an alternate reality where they are not friends. In an alternate version of "Itch to Explore", Craig is a member of the Junior Forest Scouts, Kelsey and a rat version of Mortimor are members of the Ninja Kids and J.P. is with the Paintball Kids. Dissatisfied with their groups, they team up to explore the patch of poison ivy in the center of the Creek.: Note: This was advertised as being the 100th episode of the series. Additionally, it reuses footage from the Pilot episode.
100	20	"Snow Day"	Jason Dwyer & Roan Helfer	Lamar Abrams, Matt Burnett, Tiffany Ford, Ashleigh Hairston, Ben Levin, Jeff Trammell, Charmaine Verhagen & Cody Ziglar	December 31, 2020	1091-101	0.328
Craig is hoping for a snow day, but is told that there will only be a two-hour delay. He and his friends ask the Witches of the Creek for help where they ask for items (consisting of breakfast and a phone charger) in exchange for a full-on snow day. As they go to retrieve the requested items, Craig learns that Bernard has lost all hope on a snow day and tries to stop him.
101 102	21 22	"Winter Break"	Angel Lorenzana, Dashawn Mahone, Najja Porter & Ashley Tahilan	Matt Burnett, Tiffany Ford, Ben Levin, Dashawn Mahone, Najja Porter & Jeff Trammell	January 18, 2021 (Note: This episode was first released online on January 8, 2021.)	1091-102 1091-103HH	0.386
After two weeks of Winter Break, Craig returns to the Creek to find it abandoned, save for Kit and Bobby. He eventually finds J.P. and a very feral Kelsey who are both mad at him as he spent his two weeks playing a new video game he got for Christmas instead of heading to the Creek to play with them. As they argue, they are alerted by the Green Poncho that King Xavier and his forces from the Other Side are launching their attack. Outnumbered and out-snowballed, Craig, Kelsey and J.P. cannot mend their split as war continues to loom over them and the Creek.: Note: This is a double-length episode.
103	23	"Snow Place Like Home"	Lamar Abrams & Charmaine Verhagen	Matt Burnett, Tiffany Ford, Ashleigh Hairston, Ben Levin, Dashawn Mahone, Najja Porter & Jeff Trammell	February 6, 2021	1091-104	0.318
After spending a day in the cold, the Stump Kids return to Craig's house to warm themselves up. They are promised grilled cheese sandwiches, but have to wait thirty minutes before they are finished, so they decide to find things to do in the house, such as drinking hot cocoa, playing video games and taking part in hide and seek. Over time, the kids enjoy the indoor activities.
104	24	"Breaking the Ice"	Dashawn Mahone & Najja Porter	Matt Burnett, Tiffany Ford, Ashleigh Hairston, Ben Levin, Dashawn Mahone, Najja Porter & Jeff Trammell	February 13, 2021 (Note: This episode was first released online on February 5, 2021.)	1091-107	0.254
Craig on his own, discovers an abandoned playhouse in the middle of a frozen lake. He ends up running into his rival Wildernessa and are left stranded when the ice breaks. As usual, the two end up bickering and arguing over their differing views. However, when they are forced to huddle into the playhouse to escape the cold, the two of them end up learning more about one another.
105	25	"Winter Creeklympics"	Deena Beck & Amish Kumar	Lamar Abrams, Matt Burnett, Tiffany Ford, Ashleigh Hairston, Ben Levin, Dashawn Mahone, Najja Porter, Jeff Trammell, Charmaine Verhagen & Cody Ziglar	February 20, 2021	1091-105	0.204
Presented in the form of an actual annual special, it is the Winter Creeklympics and the Stump Kids are doing everything they can to win a gold medal for the first time. However, with every new segment, the Stump Kids seem to be getting farther and farther away from winning anything. Ultimately, the group learns that it is better to have fun than win anything at all.
106	26	"Welcome to Creek Street"	Jason Dwyer & Roan Helfer	Matt Burnett, Christina Catucci, Tiffany Ford, Ashleigh Hairston, Ben Levin, Zachary Scheer & Jeff Trammell	February 27, 2021	1091-106	0.276
Craig builds a "snowme" and convinces Kelsey and J.P. to do the same, resulting in some interesting new houses. Bobby joins in on the fun, but soon they decide that in order to maintain their "lifestyles", they need to get jobs. Feeling that they are overworked, they decide to fight back against their "boss" (an inflatable clown), but get into more trouble.
107	27	"Fan or Foe"	Angel Lorenzana & Ashley Tahilan	Matt Burnett, Tiffany Ford, Ashleigh Hairston, Ben Levin & Jeff Trammell	March 6, 2021	1091-108	0.233
Elder Con comes to the Creek and the Stump Kids are excited. Craig befriends a fellow fan, but ends up in a trivia battle with her over a cup, Kelsey sets up a booth and tries to sell her book, but has trouble getting any customers and J.P. tries to get into a screening room, but encounters obstacles. When he finally enters, he discovers something unusual about the anime shown.
108	28	"The New Jersey"	Lamar Abrams & Charmaine Verhagen	Matt Burnett, Tiffany Ford, Ashleigh Hairston, Ben Levin, Jeff Trammell & Charmaine Verhagen	March 13, 2021 (Note: This episode was first released online on March 5, 2021.)	1091-109	0.262
J.P. accidentally destroys his jersey. His father sends him a new one from Canada, but it is blue instead of orange. A couple of hockey kids take to his new look and recruit him into their group. However, when he learns that the recruitment is permanent, Craig, Kelsey and Bobby must quickly learn to play on the ice in order to free J.P. from his obligation.: Special guest stars: Brad Leone as Gordy and Matty Matheson as Keef
109	29	"The Sunflower"	Deena Beck, Anatola Howard & Amish Kumar	Matt Burnett, Tiffany Ford, Ashleigh Hairston, Anatola Howard, Ben Levin & Jeff Trammell	March 20, 2021	1091-110	0.318
With winter over and spring beginning, Kelsey befriends a girl named Sun Chun who owns a hamster named Cookie and runs a giant hamster tunnel all over the Creek. When Craig and J.P. discover that Cookie has been killed by a cat, Sun Chun becomes inconsolable. Taking Kelsey's words literally, Sun decides to steal one hundred hamsters in an effort to remove her misery.
110	30	"Craig World"	Jason Dwyer & Roan Helfer	Deena Beck, Matt Burnett, Tiffany Ford, Ashleigh Hairston, Amish Kumar, Ben Levin & Jeff Trammell	March 27, 2021	1091-111	0.321
The Stump Kids discover an inflatable slide in the middle of the Creek. When the 10 Speeds commend Craig for finding it, he turns it into a mini attraction for the other kids. However, when the ride becomes stale, Craig transforms a section of the Creek into an amusement park called Craig World and begins to ignore his friends as well as the air leaking from the slide.
111	31	"Body Swap"	Dashawn Mahone & Najja Porter	Matt Burnett, Tiffany Ford, Ashleigh Hairston, Ben Levin, Jeff Trammell & Cody Ziglar	June 7, 2021	1091-112	0.207
Craig wishes he didn't have siblings, Kelsey wishes that she did and J.P. wants to have a supervisor for his projects. With Wren's help, she uses a body swap machine to grant their wishes. However, Kelsey finds Craig's family difficult to maintain, J.P. thinks that Kelsey's dad is boring and Craig thinks that the Mercer household is creepy at night.
112	32	"Copycat Carter"	Angel Lorenzana & Ashley Tahilan	Matt Burnett, Tiffany Ford, Ashleigh Hairston, Ben Levin & Jeff Trammell	June 8, 2021	1091-113	0.142
The Stump Kids and Jessica encounter Carter, now rebooted as a new robot. They decide to teach him to be a kid again, but he suddenly begins mimicking Craig to the point that he starts to look like him and do things without him. Angered over his stolen identity, Craig tries to reawaken who he once was and ends up putting Jessica in trouble.
113	33	"Brother Builder"	Pearl Low & Richie Pope	Deena Beck, Matt Burnett, Tiffany Ford, Ashleigh Hairston, Amish Kumar, Ben Levin & Jeff Trammell	June 9, 2021	1091-114	0.154
As Craig prepares a birthday gift for Jessica, he decides to tell Cannonball and Sparkle Cadet how he is such a good builder. In flashback, Craig and Bernard are dropped off at their grandparents while their parents go away to have Jessica. Thinking that he's neither the older brother nor the baby anymore, Craig helps his grandfather with a special project.
114	34	"Jessica the Intern"	Deena Beck & Amish Kumar	Deena Beck, Matt Burnett, Tiffany Ford, Ashleigh Hairston, Amish Kumar, Ben Levin & Jeff Trammell	June 10, 2021	1091-115	0.163
Craig takes Jessica to the Creek where she becomes entranced with Kit's Trading Tree business. Kit takes her on as an intern and shows her the ins and outs of running it. When Jessica gives away "sticker chips" to the Creek Kids, Kit and Jessica hit upon a new business strategy. However, when their stock runs dry, the kids turn into zombies as they demand more.
115 116 117 118 119 120	35 36 37 38 39 40	"Capture the Flag"	Roan Everly & Angel Lorenzana	Matt Burnett, Tiffany Ford, Ashleigh Hairston, Ben Levin & Jeff Trammell; Roan Everly & Angel Lorenzana (part 1 only); Lamar Abrams & Charmaine Verhagen (part 3 only); Dashawn Mahone & Najja Porter (part 5 only)	June 28, 2021	1091-118	0.539
115 116 117 118 119 120	35 36 37 38 39 40	"Capture the Flag"	Deena Beck & Amish Kumar	Matt Burnett, Tiffany Ford, Ashleigh Hairston, Ben Levin & Jeff Trammell; Roan Everly & Angel Lorenzana (part 1 only); Lamar Abrams & Charmaine Verhagen (part 3 only); Dashawn Mahone & Najja Porter (part 5 only)	June 29, 2021	1091-120	0.371
115 116 117 118 119 120	35 36 37 38 39 40	"Capture the Flag"	Lamar Abrams & Charmaine Verhagen	Matt Burnett, Tiffany Ford, Ashleigh Hairston, Ben Levin & Jeff Trammell; Roan Everly & Angel Lorenzana (part 1 only); Lamar Abrams & Charmaine Verhagen (part 3 only); Dashawn Mahone & Najja Porter (part 5 only)	June 30, 2021	1091-119	0.404
115 116 117 118 119 120	35 36 37 38 39 40	"Capture the Flag"	Jason Dwyer & Ashley Tahilan	Matt Burnett, Tiffany Ford, Ashleigh Hairston, Ben Levin & Jeff Trammell; Roan Everly & Angel Lorenzana (part 1 only); Lamar Abrams & Charmaine Verhagen (part 3 only); Dashawn Mahone & Najja Porter (part 5 only)	July 1, 2021	1091-121	0.441
115 116 117 118 119 120	35 36 37 38 39 40	"Capture the Flag"	Jason Dwyer, Dashawn Mahone, Leiana Nitura, Najja Porter & Ashley Tahilan	Matt Burnett, Tiffany Ford, Ashleigh Hairston, Ben Levin & Jeff Trammell; Roan Everly & Angel Lorenzana (part 1 only); Lamar Abrams & Charmaine Verhagen (part 3 only); Dashawn Mahone & Najja Porter (part 5 only)	July 2, 2021	1091-116HH	0.482
115 116 117 118 119 120	35 36 37 38 39 40	"Capture the Flag"	Jason Dwyer, Dashawn Mahone, Leiana Nitura, Najja Porter & Ashley Tahilan	Matt Burnett, Tiffany Ford, Ashleigh Hairston, Ben Levin & Jeff Trammell; Roan Everly & Angel Lorenzana (part 1 only); Lamar Abrams & Charmaine Verhagen (part 3 only); Dashawn Mahone & Najja Porter (part 5 only)	July 2, 2021	1091-117	0.482
"Part 1: The Candy": When Kit gets a bad score, she's unable to get her supply for the Trading Tree. The Stump Kids try to help her out, but accidentally convince her Grandma to send her to Summer School; leaving the Creek without its main source of nourishment. King Xavier and the Kids from the Other Side arrive to offer their candy and split the Council of the Creek over what to do with him.; "Part 2: The King": King Xavier's begun taking over the Creek with his promise of candy to all the children. The Stump Kids try to continue having fun, but Xavier's forces keep changing everything for the worse to the point where the Creek becomes a totalitarian state which causes many of the kids to leave and become "Indoor kids". When Craig finally tries to step up against the tyrant, Xavier has Bobby give Craig's mom's phone number to him and uses it against him; possibly getting him grounded.; "Part 3: The Legend": Craig isn't grounded, but his mom doesn't want him to visit the Creek until the whole issue with Xavier is over. He meets up with Kelsey and J.P. and decide to go see Xavier's sister Cheyenne to get him to stop. She refuses and they end up meeting his older brother Kenneth, the Elders' original fourth member. He explains his history, but cannot help them either, so the Stump Kids resort to desperate measures.; "Part 4: The Plan": Craig breaks into Xavier's house during a sleepover to challenge him to the dangerous game of Capture the Flag. He agrees and reunites with the other Creek Kids and Jason, who'd been working under Xavier, but as a mole for Craig. All the major Creek Kids gather at Craig's house along with a repentant Bobby and a reinvigorated Green Poncho. The game is just beginning.; "Part 5: The Game": Both sides take off with the Creek Kids splitting into groups so that they can find the flag on the Other Side, but must avoid getting tagged. Craig finally reaches Xavier who has the flag sewn into his jacket. Meanwhile, Maya sweeps across the Creek to where J.P. and Carter are hiding with the flag and she manages to get it. Kelsey overcomes her fear of her to face her alongside the Green Poncho and the original, Michelle. Ultimately, Craig succeeds in getting the flag to his side and dismantles the hierarchy of the Other Side; now knowing that there's more to explore. The Green Poncho officially retires, but is left without his original best friend, Maya.; Notes: This part is a double-length episode.; Special performance of "Positive Contact" by Deltron 3030.

=== Season 4 (2021–23) ===
No. overall	No. in season	Title	Written and storyboarded by	Story by	Original release date	Prod. code	US viewers (millions)
121	1	"The Legend of the Library"	Jason Dwyer & Angel Lorenzana	Matt Burnett, Tiffany Ford, Ashleigh Hairston, Ben Levin, Leiana Nitura, Michael Rodriguez, Ashley Tahilan & Jeff Trammell	October 25, 2021	1105-131	0.189
To escape the rain, the Stump Kids head to the library where other Creek Kids are staying. When the power goes out and kids disappear, Stacks believes that La Llorona is to blame. It turns out that the ghost is actually the substitute librarian who takes her job very seriously and has the kids promise to take good care of the library.
122	2	"Locked Out Cold"	Lamar Abrams & Charmaine Verhagen	Matt Burnett, Tiffany Ford, Ashleigh Hairston, Ben Levin & Jeff Trammell	December 6, 2021	1105-133	0.150
While trying to meet up with the rest of the Williams', Craig, Jessica and Bernard accidentally lock themselves out of the house when trying to get the car keys. They go to Alexis and Kelsey's house to get a spare, but fall short. Jessica hid a spare in their gutter and gets it, but accidentally destroys their car. In the end, J.P. is revealed to have one as he and Laura drive them to their family.
123	3	"Beyond the Overpass"	Dashawn Mahone & Najja Porter	Matt Burnett, Ben Levin, Jeff Trammell, Tiffany Ford & Ashleigh Hairston	January 17, 2022	1105-122	0.203
Craig is having trouble getting respect for his heroic deeds of saving the Creek until he encounters Omar who has given up being the Green Poncho. Omar gets attention, both good and bad, leaving Craig jealous. However, Craig finally gets recognized after saving a roller blader and gets a piece of a Rubik's Cube that he decides to complete. Omar officially joins the Stump Kids.
124	4	"Sink or Swim Team"	Leiana Nitura & Ashley Tahilan	Matt Burnett, Ben Levin, Jeff Trammell, Tiffany Ford & Ashleigh Hairston	January 17, 2022	1105-123	0.200
Craig learns that the Sewer Queen, real named Eileen, has been taking swimming classes, but has been ditching them and asks Craig to cover for her. While at her house, Kesley, J.P. and the Sewer Kids get into a fight, just as Craig is enjoying himself. Eileen reveals to her mother her deception and everything gets resolved with her mother inviting everyone in to eat.
125	5	"The Quick Name"	Jason Dwyer & Angel Lorenzana	Matt Burnett, Ben Levin, Jeff Trammell, Tiffany Ford, Ashleigh Hairston & Kevin Sukho Lee	January 17, 2022	1105-125	0.189
Craig gets "finessed" by Keun Sup; causing everyone to call him Finesse "and not in a good way". Keun Sup decides to help Craig lose the nickname, but all attempts fail. Craig tries to finesse Toman, but Keun Sup stops him after realizing it will cause a chain reaction and gets finessed in his place. Craig convinces everyone stop with the nicknames as he and Keun Sup make amends.
126	6	"The Chef's Challenge"	Deena Beck & Amish Kumar	Matt Burnett, Ben Levin, Jeff Trammell, Tiffany Ford, Ashleigh Hairston & Elizabeth Chee	January 17, 2022	1105-124	0.164
The Stump Kids come across Xavier's former cooking staff. Their leader Rick insists that they make only peanut butter sandwiches, so the Stump Kids challenge him, only to fail. Another chef, Tien decides to challenge him and wins with his original dish. Rick hands leadership over to Tien by earning a piece of the cube. He gives it to the Stump Kids as thanks for inspiring him, along with the bill.
127	7	"The Sparkle Solution"	Pearl Low & Richie Pope	Matt Burnett, Ben Levin, Jeff Trammell, Tiffany Ford, Ashleigh Hairston & Mia Resella	January 17, 2022	1105-126	0.168
Craig is having difficulty finishing the extra credit on his math homework. Sparkle Cadet arrives to help him out by opening his mind up and going on an adventure to fight the evil Denominator (a figment of their imagination). Later, Craig realizes that it was a trick question and he and Sparkle Cadet race back to save Kelsey and J.P. from the Demoninator, again in their imagination.
128	8	"Better Than You"	Lamar Abrams & Charmaine Verhagen	Matt Burnett, Ben Levin, Jeff Trammell, Tiffany Ford, Ashleigh Hairston, Mia Resella & Pearl Low	January 17, 2022	1105-127	0.169
Aggie the Squashinator challenges Craig, but finds that he does not care. When she discovers his talent for drawing, she takes up the hobby herself and challenges him to a competition. They even each other out with Craig better at cartooning and Aggie better at realism. Ultimately, they decide to help each other out and end their feud, but anger everyone in attendance for the competition.
129	9	"The Dream Team"	Dashawn Mahone & Najja Porter	Matt Burnett, Ben Levin, Jeff Trammell, Tiffany Ford, Ashleigh Hairston & Charmaine Verhagen	January 17, 2022	1105-128	0.184
Craig and Bryson are spending a weekend at their grandparents' house. Everything seems fine for the two boys until they decide to try to finish an old comic Duane once owned. From that point on, the boys begin to pick at each other's skills and fall apart. In the end, they must work together to get a cat Earl was babysitting and their friendship is renewed.
130	10	"Fire & Ice"	Leiana Nitura & Ashley Tahilan	Matt Burnett, Ben Levin, Jeff Trammell, Tiffany Ford, Ashleigh Hairston, Roan Everly, Anatola Howard, Angel Lorenzana & Ashley Tahilan	January 17, 2022	1105-129	0.167
While at a book club, everyone deduces that Kelsey and Stacks' fantasy story is about them. Kelsey becomes anxious, due to the clear romantic subtext, and runs away. Craig and J.P. try to help her when she plans to cancel future meetings, but J.P. takes her to see Kat who gives her words of encouragement. After a successful meeting, Kelsey tells Stacks she likes her and she reciprocates.
131	11	"Chrono Moss"	Pearl Low & Richie Pope	Matt Burnett, Ben Levin, Tiffany Ford, Jeff Trammell, Ashleigh Hairston & Richie Pope	April 11, 2022	1105-132	0.203
The Stump Kids encounter a village that follows JRPG logic. The Mayor reveals that they have a piece of the cube and Omar uses his gaming knowledge to help the group. Craig realizes that Omar does not know what to do with himself now that he is no longer the Green Poncho, but he helps him overcome this. They manage to secure the piece and the Mayor thankfully gives it to them.
132	12	"In Search of Lore"	Leiana Nitura & Ashley Tahilan	Matt Burnett, Ben Levin, Tiffany Ford, Jeff Trammell, Ashleigh Hairston, Dashawn Mahone, Leiana Nitura, Najja Porter & Ashley Tahilan	April 12, 2022	1105-134	0.207
The Stump Kids decide to go to Kenneth for answers, but find an annoyed Xavier instead. They visit the Elders who were once friends with Kenneth. David calls him, but Mark gets into an argument over how much he has changed. David and Barry leave and the kids have no answer. They watch Kenneth's anime and realize that the "Heart of the Forest" is from the show and vow to find it, as Xavier spies on them with his drones.
133	13	"Opposite Day"	Jason Dwyer & Angel Lorenzana	Matt Burnett, Ben Levin, Tiffany Ford, Jeff Trammell & Ashleigh Hairston	April 13, 2022	1105-136	0.151
During a solar eclipse, it becomes Opposite Day at the Creek, resulting in everyone suddenly acting and saying the opposite of what they are doing. The Stump Kids hide in Wren's bunker, which is set in a different time zone, and make a contraption so that they can move the sun out of alignment. Despite some setbacks, they are able to get the contraption to work and set things right.
134	14	"Adventures in Baby Casino"	Lamar Abrams & Charmaine Verhagen	Matt Burnett, Ben Levin, Jeff Trammell, Tiffany Ford, Ashleigh Hairston & Ayo Edebiri	April 14, 2022	1105-138	0.164
For J.P.'s birthday, the Stump Kids head to the Baby Casino where they discover another piece of the cube. While they manage to acquire enough chips, they are accused of cheating by Big Baby and kicked out. Craig decides to play Big Baby at ultimate tic-tac-toe while the kids steal the cube. At first, the plan seems hopeless, but Craig wins and they secure the piece and a sticky hand for J.P.
135	15	"Creek Talent Extravaganza"	Deena Beck & Amish Kumar	Matt Burnett, Ben Levin, Tiffany Ford, Jeff Trammell, Ashleigh Hairston & Mia Resella	April 15, 2022	1105-135	0.251
When the Daycare gets wrecked from a storm, and raccoons, Craig decides to hold a talent show with kids donating toys to get in. With the promise of the Sing-Along Friends showing up, Craig tries to stall as everyone does their best to perform. When the audience gets restless, Craig leads everyone into singing the Sharing Song; saving the show and succeeding in helping the Daycare.
136	16	"Dodgy Decisions"	Deena Beck & Amish Kumar	Matt Burnett, Ben Levin, Jeff Trammell, Ashleigh Hairston, Najja Porter & Dashawn Mahone	April 18, 2022	1105-130	0.120
On Dodgeball Day, Craig discovers that his name has been chosen as team captain. To combat Jackie, he forms a team, but forgets to pick Kelsey, angering her. During the match, Omar and Maya have an awkward encounter. In the final round, Omar and Maya and Craig and Kelsey make up (J.P. reveals that Kelsey put his name in) while Jackie, whom Craig was afraid of, forms a friendship with them.
137	17	"Hyde & Zeke"	Leiana Nitura & Ashley Tahilan	Matt Burnett, Ben Levin, Tiffany Ford, Ashleigh Hairston, Dashawn Mahone, Najja Porter & Jeff Trammell	April 19, 2022	1105-139	0.142
The Stump Kids meet Zeke, who has a piece of the cube and asks that they find his twin brother Hyde who has not been found after a game of hide and seek. After many failed attempts to get him, Craig suddenly realizes that Hyde is made up and the group manage to out Zeke who gives them the piece. However, after they leave, it is revealed that Hyde and Zeke really are twins who lure other kids to play with them.
138	18	"The Anniversary Box"	Pearl Low & Richie Pope	Matt Burnett, Ben Levin, Tiffany Ford, Jeff Trammell, Ashleigh Hairston, Lamar Abrams, Dashawn Mahone, Najja Porter & Charmaine Verhagen	April 20, 2022	1105-137	0.125
Duane tasks Craig with looking after a box for him while he and Nicole go to a spa for their anniversary. Craig takes Jessica to the Creek, but accidentally loses the box; forcing him and his friends to go look for it. After several near misses, Richard attempts to call "finders keepers" on it, but Jessica beats him up and gets the box back. The box has a necklace inside; surprising both Craig and Jessica.
139	19	"Lost & Found"	Jason Dwyer & Angel Lorenzana	Matt Burnett, Ben Levin, Lamar Abrams, Ashleigh Hairston, Dashawn Mahone, Najja Porter, Jeff Trammell & Charmaine Verhagen	April 21, 2022	1105-141	0.136
The Stump Kids find a piece of the cube at the Lost and Found, but the owner Salma refuses to give it up as they technically do not own it. She reveals that she lost a fish toy named Bubbles, resulting in J.P. going to get it as he found it years ago. The rest of the kids fail to get the cube and are nearly banned, but J.P. returns the toy. Seeing the life it had, Salma decides to give the cube piece to the Stump Kids.
140	20	"Grandma Smugglers"	Deena Beck & Amish Kumar	Matt Burnett, Ben Levin, Deena Beck, Tiffany Ford, Ashleigh Hairston, Amish Kumar, Dashawn Mahone, Najja Porter & Jeff Trammell	April 22, 2022	1105-140	0.153
Craig finds a rock in the Creek that Raj says looks like the one that his grandmother, Nila Ba, used to play on when she was a little girl in India. Craig and Raj decide to sneak her out of the house against the wishes of Raj's father, Ravi, while Kelsey and J.P. follow them. Ravi catches up to them, but Raj explains why he brought her to the rock. The family embraces as Craig marks the location on his map as Nila Ba's Rock.
141	21	"The Champion's Hike"	Leiana Nitura & Ashley Tahilan	Matt Burnett, Ashleigh Hairston, Ben Levin, Dashawn Mahone, Leiana Nitura, Najja Porter, Ashley Tahilan & Jeff Trammell	July 11, 2022	1105-144	0.154
Craig gets invited to join the Champions on a hike with Maya also joining. Throughout the hike, Craig tries to fit in, but ends up embarrassing himself by making strange comments. Maya realizes what is happening and tells Craig to just be himself. When they reach a waterfall, Craig decides to relax and everyone, sans Jackie, decide to do the same. Maya admits that she is still on the fence about Craig.
142	22	"Bored Games"	Pearl Low & Richie Pope	Matt Burnett, Ashleigh Hairston, Ben Levin, Dashawn Mahone, Najja Porter & Jeff Trammell	July 12, 2022	1105-142	0.090
To beat their boredom in the rain, the Stump Kids decide to combine all their board games, which are all missing pieces, into one big board game. They get "transported" to another world where they have to face numerous dangers. When they finally reach the end, Kelsey tells Craig that he needs to "end" the game instead of winning and he reluctantly agrees (Kelsey and J.P. let him win in the past).
143	23	"Scoutguest"	Deena Beck & Danny Kilgore	Deena Beck, Matt Burnett, Ashleigh Hairston, Ben Levin, Dashawn Mahone, Najja Porter & Jeff Trammell	July 13, 2022	1105-145	0.099
Jason comes to Craig asking if he can stay with him at his house as his parents are not home and he locked himself out. Craig reluctantly relents and invites him over where his family show their hospitality and convince Craig to do the same after being moody that evening. Craig comes to the realization that Jason's parents are imperfect and in the morning, he invites him to wait with him and Jessica at the bus stop.
144	24	"My Stare Lady"	Jason Dwyer & Angel Lorenzana	Matt Burnett, Ashleigh Hairston, Ben Levin, Dashawn Mahone, Najja Porter & Jeff Trammell	July 14, 2022	1105-146	0.152
The Stump Kids are met by the Stare Master who has a piece of the cube. Kelsey tries to face her, but is defeated. Craig trains so that he can face her. When the day comes, Craig tries to avoid distractions until Craig spots something that distracts the Stare Master, defeating her. While Craig is happy that he got the cube piece, he is disappointed that he missed the things that were happening around him.
145	25	"Silver Fist Returns"	Lamar Abrams & Charmaine Verhagen	Matt Burnett, Ben Levin, Jeff Trammell, Benjamin Anders, Ashleigh Hairston, Dashawn Mahone & Najja Porter	July 15, 2022	1105-143	0.113
A cat burglar is stealing items due to his diary being held captive. J.P. becomes his superhero persona Silver Fist to find the culprit. After Craig's staff is stolen, the Stump Kids find the cat burglar is working for Eliza. They defeat her and return everyone's things. The cat burglar is revealed to be the Secret Kid and reveals to George that he likes him and he agrees to go out with him on a date.
146	26	"Craig to the Future"	Leiana Nitura & Ashley Tahilan	Matt Burnett, Ashleigh Hairston, Ben Levin, Dashawn Mahone, Najja Porter & Jeff Trammell	November 7, 2022	1105-149	0.129
The Stump Kids go to visit the Witches, who read them their future, showing how their life will change 6 years in the future, with Craig becoming a commission artist, J.P. as the manager of the smoothie shop, Omar working in a comic book shop, and Kelsey as a wrestler, alongside the future of other kids of the Creek. By the end, they promise to stay friends forever, though Craig seems amiss.
147	27	"Craig of the Street"	Pearl Low & Richie Pope	Matt Burnett, Ashleigh Hairston, Ben Levin, Dashawn Mahone, Najja Porter & Jeff Trammell	November 8, 2022	1105-147	N/A
Craig and Jessica visit their relatives in New Jersey. Craig asks Bryson to show him around the city and they make a trek to go to the laundromat to play an arcade game under the guise of getting a butter roll for Bryson's dad. They make numerous stops that Craig archives onto a map. They make it to the arcade, having to trade the roll, only to play for a couple of seconds. Craig is still glad however.
148	28	"Puppy Love"	Lamar Abrams & Charmaine Verhagen	Matt Burnett, Ashleigh Hairston, Ben Levin, Dashawn Mahone, Najja Porter & Jeff Trammell	November 9, 2022	1105-148	0.157
Craig gets a text from Wildernessa, whom he now calls Vanessa, to meet her privately. She reveals that Cheese Sticks is missing, but they both discover that Brigid has her, while dressed in a dog costume. Vanessa respects Cheese Sticks' independence, but when Brigid plans to swap bodies with the dog, they thwart her. Afterwards, Vanessa admits that "Cheese Sticks" likes Craig, and he reciprocates.
149	29	"Galactic Goodbyes"	Pearl Low & Richie Pope	Khaila Amazan, Matt Burnett, Ashleigh Hairston, Ben Levin, Pearl Low, Dashawn Mahone, Richie Pope, Najja Porter & Jeff Rosenstock	November 10, 2022	1105-157	0.099
Craig learns that Sparkle Cadet had a friend, dubbed "Starboy", whom she misses after moving away. After hearing her thoughts out loud, Craig suggests converting them into a song and they gather Kelsey, J.P., Raj, Beth and Stacks to form a band called "Peanut Head". At first, their song is a bust, but due to positivity, they reconfigure and manage to make the song work.
150	30	"Back to Cool"	Jason Dwyer & Angel Lorenzana	Khaila Amazan, Matt Burnett, Jason Dwyer, Ashleigh Hairston, Ben Levin, Angel Lorenzana, Dashawn Mahone, Leiana Nitura, Najja Porter & Ashley Tahilan	November 11, 2022	1105-160	N/A
Eliza lists off the latest fashion trends which causes the Stump Kids to be self conscious. Craig tries to make a fake Ducci Bag, but Nicole buys a real one and he takes it to the Creek, only for Eliza to ruin it. Nicole is angry, but tells Craig that he should be comfortable with how he dresses. On the day of the Creek fashion show, Craig shows his casual clothes, impressing everyone.: Special guest star: Bob the Drag Queen as Nicole's Ducci Bag
151	31	"The Jump Off"	Pearl Low & Richie Pope	Matt Burnett, Ashleigh Hairston, Ben Levin, Dashawn Mahone, Najja Porter & Jeff Trammell	April 3, 2023	1105-152	0.131
Craig, Cannonball, Sparkle Cadet, and Diane are challenged by the latter's former double dutch team led by Brittani. They are trained by Nicole, but when she learns they are training out of revenge, she warns them that it will lead them nowhere. They attend the challenge and despite losing, Brittani's team congratulate them on the effort and Brittani apologizes to Diane for how she acted.: Special guest star: Missy Elliott as Carla Frazier
152	32	"The Cow-Boy and Marie"	Lamar Abrams & Charmaine Verhagen	Lamar Abrams, Matt Burnett, Ashleigh Hairston, Ben Levin, Dashawn Mahone, Najja Porter, Jeff Trammell & Charmaine Verhagen	April 4, 2023	1105-153	0.105
Marie, the one Horse Girl who tires of her lifestyle, falls in love with the Cow-Boy who breaks all the rules at the Creek. The Stump Kids and the rest of the Horse Girls discover that they are causing havoc and try to stop them. Eventually, they end up on a runaway train where Cow-Boy abandons Marie, and Mackenzie overcomes her stubbornness to help her friends. Marie rejoins the Horse Girls and Mackenzie becomes more liberal.
153	33	"The Cursed Word"	Deena Beck & Molly Flood	Matt Burnett, Jason Dwyer, Ashleigh Hairston, Ben Levin, Angel Lorenzana, Dashawn Mahone & Najja Porter	April 5, 2023	1105-155	0.264
Craig learns new "cursed" word "clonque" after his map flies into a tree. Despite getting constant warnings about the word, he continues to say it all the time, but starts to become paranoid. He goes to the witches who reveal that clonque came from an earworm song that got on everyone's nerves. Craig reveals this to the other kids at the Creek, only for a bucket to fall and hit him in the head.
154	34	"Craiggy & the Slime Factory"	Jason Dwyer & Angel Lorenzana	Matt Burnett, Jason Dwyer, Ben Levin, Angel Lorenzana, Ashleigh Hairston, Dashawn Mahone, Leiana Nitura, Najja Porter & Ashley Tahilan	April 6, 2023	1105-156	0.180
In a parody of Willy Wonka and the Chocolate Factory, the Stump Kids get invited to the Slime Factory, where the owner, Ooey, gives them a tour of the premises. J.P. and Kelsey fall to vices while Craig and Omar accidentally get some slime on them. Ooey chastises them, but after an apology, she rewards them with a lifetime supply of new slime and the next piece of the cube.
155	35	"A Tattle Tale"	Deena Beck & Brittney Williams	Matt Burnett, Ashleigh Hairston, Ben Levin, Dashawn Mahone, Najja Porter, Ashley Tahilan & Jeff Trammell	April 7, 2023	1105-150	0.142
The Stump Kids end up on a small island where they meet Lou who promises to patch up their raft. They come across a group of kids who like to tattle on every minor thing that happens, forcing the Stump Kids to try to teach them to "mind your business". They realize that Lou was trying to escape and the Stump Kids stop him and strand him on the island with the tattling kids.
156	36	"Craig of the Campus"	Jason Dwyer & Angel Lorenzana	Matt Burnett, Ashleigh Hairston, Ben Levin, Dashawn Mahone, Najja Porter & Jeff Trammell	May 29, 2023	1105-151	N/A
Bernard takes Craig against his will to Herkelston University. While there, Craig spots Kenneth and chases him while Bernard sits in on a class, only to find it difficult. Craig asks Kenneth about the cube and losing your friends and he comforts him about the hardships in life. Afterwards, Craig and a defeated Bernard head home. When Craig mentions the Creek, Bernard starts marinating on the idea.
157	37	"Wheels Collide"	Leiana Nitura & Ashley Tahilan	Matt Burnett, Jason Dwyer, Ashleigh Hairston, Ben Levin, Angel Lorenzana, Dashawn Mahone, Richie Pope & Najja Porter	May 29, 2023	1105-154	0.169
Craig gets the idea to introduce the 10 Speeds to the Maverick Splinters, but immediately regrets it when they both competitively compare their choice of sport: bicycling against rollerblading. They hold a race, but after breaking the barrier, they are forced to battle the Speed Demon. After "80 years", or mere seconds for Craig, both teams return with a better appreciation for each other.
158	38	"Bernard of the Creek"	Lamar Abrams & Charmaine Verhagen	Lamar Abrams, Harron Atkins, Matt Burnett, Ashleigh Hairston, Ben Levin, Dashawn Mahone, Najja Porter, Zachary Scheer & Charmaine Verhagen	May 29, 2023	1105-158	0.173
159	39	"Bernard of the Creek"	Leiana Nitura & Ashley Tahilan	Lamar Abrams, Harron Atkins, Matt Burnett, Ashleigh Hairston, Ben Levin, Dashawn Mahone, Najja Porter, Zachary Scheer, Charmaine Verhagen, Leiana Nitura & Ashley Tahilan	May 29, 2023	1105-159	0.201
Part 1: Bernard, still reeling from his college visit, asks Craig if he can visit the Creek with him. While upset at first, Craig ends up enjoying Bernard's presence. Bernard gets back into playing Bring Out Your Beasts, but he neglects Alexis who finds out what he is doing and asks that they have some "space" between each other. Saddened and defeated, Bernard runs into Elder Mark who takes him under his wing.; Part 2: Bernard starts hanging out with Mark and shirks his chores at home, upsetting Craig. He invites the Student Council and Barry who hold an intervention, but Bernard refuses to budge. Barry suggests challenging Mark to combat, which Alexis decides to partake in. Bernard eventually sees the error of his ways and admits he is scared of the future. Alexis decides that they should have fun and gets back with him.
160	40	"Left in the Dark"	Deena Beck & Kellye Perdue (credited as Peroroh)	Lamar Abrams, Harron Atkins, Matt Burnett, Ashleigh Hairston, Ben Levin, Dashawn Mahone, Leiana Nitura, Najja Porter, Zachary Scheer, Ashley Tahilan, Jeff Trammell & Charmaine Verhagen	May 29, 2023	1105-161	0.196
After a very awkward meeting with Maya, the Stump Kids get a tip about a cube piece in a cave. They discover it is filled with glow in the dark stars and try to find a way to light it up. Eventually, they discover that one of the cube pieces is embedded in the wall, but before they can get it, they are confronted by the mysterious Red Poncho, who silently steals the cube piece before they can get it.

=== Season 5 (2023) ===
No. overall	No. in season	Title	Written and storyboarded by	Story by	Original release date	Prod. code	US viewers (millions)
161	1	"Who Is the Red Poncho?"	Charmaine Verhagen & Lamar Abrams	Harron Atkins, Matt Burnett, Lorraine DeGraffenreidt, Ben Levin, Dashawn Mahone & Najja Porter	July 10, 2023	1119-162	0.155
The Stump Kids go through every possible candidate for the Red Poncho, with Craig reluctantly also admitting Maya as a candidate. Omar goes to meet with her to prove them wrong, but gets mad when he sees her with a cube piece. The two are attacked by the real Red Poncho, but Maya feels betrayed by Omar and she takes the piece back. Craig notices the use of drones and realizes the Red Poncho is Xavier.
162	2	"The Once and Future King"	Deena Beck & Molly Flood	Harron Atkins, Matt Burnett, Lorraine DeGraffenreidt, Ben Levin, Dashawn Mahone & Najja Porter	July 10, 2023	1119-163	0.196
In a flashback, Xavier is revealed to have become incredibly depressed and becomes obsessed with flying drones. When he learns that the Stump Kids are looking for the Heart of the Forest, he asks Kenneth who reveals that it gave him friends. Xavier has his sister Cheyenne train him once she sees how motivated he is at returning to his role as king and he officially becomes the Red Poncho.
163	3	"War of the Pieces"	Ashley Tahilan, Leiana Nitura, Jason Dwyer & Angel Lorenzana	Harron Atkins, Matt Burnett, Lorraine DeGraffenreidt, Ben Levin, Dashawn Mahone & Najja Porter	July 11, 2023	1119-164	0.123
164	4	"War of the Pieces"	Ashley Tahilan, Leiana Nitura, Jason Dwyer & Angel Lorenzana	Harron Atkins, Matt Burnett, Lorraine DeGraffenreidt, Ben Levin, Dashawn Mahone & Najja Porter	July 11, 2023	1119-165HH	0.123
The Stump Kids decide to take their searching into overdrive, but after successfully getting pieces from the Mole Kids and the Hospital Kids, begin to lose every other new find to Xavier who uses his drones and ingenuity to beat, or even steal, from them. The Stump Kids are at a loss over having lost many pieces, but begin to wonder if Xavier managed to get more. They meet with him at his house and discover he has ten while they have fifteen, meaning there is one more. Realizing that Maya has it, everyone races to her house to get it back. But upon asking her upfront, she shuts the door in their faces.
165	5	"A League of Maya's Own"	Richie Pope & Pearl Low	Harron Atkins, Matt Burnett, Lorraine DeGraffenreidt, Ben Levin, Dashawn Mahone & Najja Porter	July 12, 2023	1119-166	0.143
In a flashback, following Capture the Flag, Maya returns home and in an effort to stop thinking about Omar, and to avoid a conversation with her mother, decides to take up baseball again. She eventually meets with Omar and learns about the Heart of the Forest, which makes her realize that the cube piece was in her coat. Catching up to the present, Maya reveals that she was so angry, she threw the cube piece into the Creek.
166	6	"The Cheese Stands Alone"	Charmaine Verhagen & Lamar Abrams	Harron Atkins, Matt Burnett, Lorraine DeGraffenreidt, Ben Levin, Dashawn Mahone & Najja Porter	July 12, 2023	1119-167	0.127
Following a failed search for the piece, Craig goes home and has a nightmare about his future. He attempts to hang out with Kelsey and J.P., but they are busy hanging out with Stacks and Omar, respectively. Craig goes to talk to Vanessa whom he pours his heart out to, only to realize that his future of losing his friends is coming true. He runs into Xavier again who calls for a truce in finding the piece.
167	7	"The Team Up"	Deena Beck & Danica Dickison	Harron Atkins, Matt Burnett, Lorraine DeGraffenreidt, Ben Levin, Dashawn Mahone & Najja Porter	July 13, 2023	1119-168	0.107
Craig goes to Xavier's house to plan and discovers that he is a Slide the Ferret fan. The two of them slowly begin to connect with one another as Craig realizes that Xavier can program his drones to do anything. They teach it to find cube pieces and working together manage to find the last one. Xavier lets Craig keep it as he has started treating him like a true friend and they call everyone to come together.
168	8	"Putting Together the Pieces"	Richie Pope & Pearl Low	Harron Atkins, Matt Burnett, Lorraine DeGraffenreidt, Ben Levin, Dashawn Mahone & Najja Porter	July 13, 2023	1119-171	0.113
The rest of the Stump Kids and Maya do not trust Xavier, but Craig vouches for him as they complete the cube. During the journey to the Heart of the Forest, Xavier attempts to connect with the other kids, but they ignore him and bond with Maya. They find a waterfall entrance, but upon entering, Xavier admits he is upset that everyone still sees him as a villain and surrounds them with drones.
169	9	"Heart of the Forest" (Note: Billed as "Heart of the Forest Finale" promotionally, and on websites like The Futon Critic.)	Jason Dwyer, Leiana Nitura, Ifesinachi Orijekwe, Ashley Tahilan & Jones Wiedle	Harron Atkins, Matt Burnett, Lorraine DeGraffenreidt, Ben Levin, Dashawn Mahone & Najja Porter	July 14, 2023	1119-169HH	0.163
170	10	"Heart of the Forest"	Jason Dwyer, Leiana Nitura, Ifesinachi Orijekwe, Ashley Tahilan & Jones Wiedle	Harron Atkins, Matt Burnett, Lorraine DeGraffenreidt, Ben Levin, Dashawn Mahone & Najja Porter	July 14, 2023	1119-170	0.163
The drones immediately go haywire and attack everyone, forcing everyone to split up within an abandoned soda factory that houses a giant tree. When Xavier outs Craig's wishes to keep his friends, Kelsey and J.P. call out his hypocrisy as he is always making friends with other kids. They are separated by a flood of soda. Maya admits that she, Omar and Xavier need to give each other time before becoming friends again. Bernard and Kenneth arrive to rescue the kids as Craig calls upon the Heart of the Forest for his friends back, giving up his map in the process. Everyone is reunited with a better appreciation for one another.

=== Film (2023) ===
In January 2022, it was reported that Cartoon Network had greenlit development of Craig of the Creek: The Movie. The film was said to be a prequel to the series. In September 2023, it was confirmed that the film would release some time later that year. In November 2023, the film's trailer, release date, and finalized title were revealed. Craig Before the Creek was released on digital platforms by Warner Bros. Discovery Home Entertainment on December 11, 2023. It premiered on Cartoon Network on January 13, 2024, and was released on DVD on March 26, 2024.

Title	Directed by	Written and storyboarded by	Original release date	Prod. code	U.S. viewers (millions)
Craig Before the Creek	Matt Burnett & Ben Levin	Story by : Matt Burnett, Tiffany Ford, Ashleigh Hairston, Ben Levin, Dashawn Mahone, Najja Porter, Jeff Trammell; Written and Storyboarded by : Lamar Abrams, Ben Levin, Dave Alegre, Angel Lorenzana, Deena Beck, Pearl Low, Matt Burnett, Leiana Nitura, Danica Dickinson, Ifesinachi Orjiekwe, Jason Dwyer, Richie Pope, Erik Fountain, Najja Porter, George O. Holguin, Ashley Tahilan, Amber Jones, & Charmaine Verhagen	December 11, 2023 (digital distribution); January 13, 2024 (Cartoon Network)	1104-000	0.10

=== Season 6 (2024–25) ===
No. overall	No. in season	Title	Written and storyboarded by	Story by	Original release date	Prod. code	US viewers (millions)
171	1	"Rise and Shine"	Pearl Low & Richie Pope	Lamar Abrams, Dave Alegre, Harron Atkins, Deena Beck, Matt Burnett, Lorraine DeGraffenreidt, Erik Fountain, Ben Levin, Najja Porter & Charmaine Verhagen	June 1, 2024	1119-174	0.119
A swarm of bees infest Craig's room. While Elder Barry (now Beekeeper Barry) removes them, Craig decides to have a sleepover at Kelsey's house. He discovers that she and her dad are "morning people" and is forced to endure their early routine. He is then tasked with helping with getting rid of a couch. He overcomes his sleepiness to help them, but decides that it would be better to go elsewhere for the next night.
172	2	"Sleep Talk JP"	Jason Dwyer & J.N. Wiedle	Lamar Abrams, Dave Alegre, Harron Atkins, Deena Beck, Matt Burnett, Lorraine DeGraffenreidt, Erik Fountain, Ben Levin, Najja Porter & Charmaine Verhagen	June 8, 2024	1119-179	0.105
Craig stays at J.P.'s, but he informs him that he sleep talks after having pineapple pizza. J.P. becomes "Merl" an older business executive who loudly keeps Craig up. He eventually convinces him to help find hidden treasure and they sneak out of the house. They encounter another sleepwalker who reveals that the treasure is Laura's work shoes, which she was missing. They return them to Laura, much to her delight.
173	3	"Toman's House"	Leiana Nitura & Ashley Tahilan	Dave Alegre, Harron Atkins, Matt Burnett, Lorraine DeGraffenreidt, Jason Dwyer, Erik Fountain, Ben Levin, Leiana Nitura, Richie Pope, Najja Porter, Ashley Tahilan & Charmaine Verhagen	June 15, 2024	1119-177	0.107
Craig stays over at Toman's and meets his older siblings Maria and Angiat and his father who expresses a strict curfew so they can go to church the next day. Craig and Toman try to sneak being up late so they can play video games. While doing so, Maria and Angiat return home late and wake up their father. Craig hastily concocts a cover and saves the siblings who grow a deeper respect for him.
174	4	"Whose Dimension Is It Anyway?"	Pearl Low & Richie Pope	Dave Alegre, Harron Atkins, Matt Burnett, Lorraine DeGraffenreidt, Erik Fountain, Ben Levin, Najja Porter & Charmaine Verhagen	June 22, 2024	1119-175	0.115
Craig stays at Wren's who expresses the desire to use dimension helmets so that they can visit different worlds in their sleep. It quickly becomes apparent that Wren is using the machine to find her "perfect" universe where her parents are still together. She finds one, but her alternate self does not display a love for science. Craig and Wren return to their dimension with Wren having a better appreciation for her life.
175	5	"Dude, Where's My Bobby?"	Leiana Nitura & Ashley Tahilan	Lamar Abrams, Dave Alegre, Harron Atkins, Deena Beck, Matt Burnett, Lorraine DeGraffenreidt, Erik Fountain, Ben Levin, Najja Porter & Charmaine Verhagen	June 29, 2024	1119-176	0.050
Craig stays at Bobby's and discovers that he is not allowed to have candy whatsoever. Bobby presents his hidden ultimate candy bar and the two pass out. The next day, Bobby is missing and Craig tries to retrace his steps and remembers that they were trying to be "bad boys" for the night. He ultimately finds Bobby, in a tree, and gets him prepped for his dental appointment he was supposed to have for the day.
176	6	"The Slumber Party"	Lamar Abrams & Deena Beck	Dave Alegre, Harron Atkins, Matt Burnett, Lorraine DeGraffenreidt, Erik Fountain, Ben Levin, Najja Porter & Charmaine Verhagen	July 6, 2024	1119-180	0.115
The Stump Kids are invited to Eliza's house, along with Toman, Wren, Bobby, and Sparkle Cadet. The kids take part in a game for a special prize with losing kids getting sent to the basement. Eventually, the Stump Kids are left, but refuse to turn on each other. The basement is revealed to be an entertainment room. They turn down the prize (to be a tea timer), and Craig finally returns to his room with Barry still there.
177	7	"The Elders of the Creek"	Leiana Nitura & Ashley Tahilan	Lamar Abrams, Dave Alegre, Harron Atkins, Deena Beck, Matt Burnett, Lorraine DeGraffenreidt, Jason Dwyer, Erik Fountain, Leiana Nitura, Benji Lee, Ben Levin, Angel Lorenzana, Pearl Low, Richie Pope, Najja Porter, Hannah Lee Stockdale, Charmaine Verhagen, Ashley Tahilan & J.N. Wiedle	January 4, 2025 (Note: This episode was uploaded to and removed from Hulu on August 1, 2024.)	1119-184	0.074
Jerry has stolen all the toys and taken over Elder Rock. Mark explains that the only way to defeat him is to bring all the Elders back. The Stump Kids successfully recruit Barry, David, and Kenneth (as well as Barry's girlfriend Melody) and confront Jerry. Mark apologizes and Craig convinces Jerry to concede. Elder Rock is turned into a hangout for the other kids and the Elders' friendship is renewed.
178	8	"JP's Bucket List"	Pearl Low & Richie Pope	Lamar Abrams, Dave Alegre, Harron Atkins, Deena Beck, Matt Burnett, Lorraine DeGraffenreidt, Jason Dwyer, Erik Fountain, Leiana Nitura, Benji Lee, Ben Levin, Angel Lorenzana, Pearl Low, Richie Pope, Najja Porter, Hannah Lee Stockdale, Charmaine Verhagen, Ashley Tahilan & J.N. Wiedle	January 11, 2025	1119-181	0.045
J.P. writes down a bucket list of things he wants to do, many of which seem impossible, yet probable in their world. He recruits Craig, Kelsey, and later Omar and Maney to help him out, though some of this list items end with them getting harmed in some way. After completing it, J.P. feels sad that it's over, but Craig and Kelsey convince him to write a new list, also full of ridiculous things.
179	9	"The Little Warrior"	Jason Dwyer & J.N. Wiedle	Lamar Abrams, Dave Alegre, Harron Atkins, Deena Beck, Matt Burnett, Lorraine DeGraffenreidt, Jason Dwyer, Erik Fountain, Leiana Nitura, Benji Lee, Ben Levin, Angel Lorenzana, Pearl Low, Richie Pope, Najja Porter, Hannah Lee Stockdale, Charmaine Verhagen, Ashley Tahilan & J.N. Wiedle	January 18, 2025	1119-182	0.092
Kelsey is preparing for picture day, but during a decisive moment, she pulls out her favorite book The Little Warrior which tells of a young warrior who learns to be confident on her own. The book is revealed to have been written by her late mother Grace as a guide of sorts to help her in life. Kelsey opts to wear her usual clothes for picture day and shows it to an amazed Craig and J.P.
180	10	"See You Tomorrow at the Creek"	Lamar Abrams & Deena Beck	Lamar Abrams, Dave Alegre, Harron Atkins, Deena Beck, Matt Burnett, Lorraine DeGraffenreidt, Jason Dwyer, Erik Fountain, Leiana Nitura, Benji Lee, Ben Levin, Angel Lorenzana, Pearl Low, Richie Pope, Najja Porter, Hannah Lee Stockdale, Charmaine Verhagen, Ashley Tahilan & J.N. Wiedle	January 25, 2025	1119-183	0.060
Craig's family take Bernard to college while he stays home. Feeling lonely, he goes to the Creek and presents his new and improved map to his friends. They decide to post it at the Trading Tree. Impressed, everyone suddenly arrives at the Stump to thank Craig for the map and they throw an impromptu party. Craig reunites with his various friends from all over the Creek who thank him in their own way, ending with Xavier arriving to take a giant group selfie with the whole cast minus The Elders and The Witches. Everyone leaves as Craig, Kelsey, and J.P. decide to stay past the dinner bell. Craig murmurs, "I'll see you tomorrow", ending the series.

== Shorts (2019) ==
On the streaming services HBO Max and Hulu, these shorts are combined to make an episode titled "Creek Shorts", listed under season 3. They also take up the production code of one entire Craig episode.

No.	Title	Written and storyboarded by	Original release date	Prod. code	US viewers (millions)
1	"Craig of the Car"	Richie Pope	November 22, 2019	1071-061A	0.192
When Bernard accidentally scratches the back of the car, Craig forces him to take his friends (and Alexis) to various pit stops.
2	"How Was Your Day?"	Written by : Lamar Abrams; Storyboarded by : Dashawn Mahone & Najja Porter	November 22, 2019	1071-061B	0.192
The origin of the ending credits animation is revealed as Craig explains what he did at the Creek to his family at dinner time.
3	"The Williams Family Opening Theme Song"	Ben Levin	November 22, 2019	1071-061C	0.192
Craig imagines what it would be like if his family had their own TV show (parodying Family Matters).
4	"How to Map the Creek"	Matt Burnett & Danny Ducker	November 29, 2019	1071-061D	0.192
Craig gives a how to on mapping the Creek, but he must also rescue J.P. and Mortimor from a "raging" river.
5	"Creek Kid Rap"	Roan Everly	December 13, 2019	1071-061E	0.192
In a parody of the "Pokérap", Craig tries to name all of the Creek Kids to Jessica, but quickly gets tired.
