= Imad Feghaly =

Lebanese actor and voice actor

- عماد فغالي
- Occupations: Actor, voice actor

Imad Feghaly (Arabic: عماد فغالي) is a Lebanese actor and voice actor.

== Filmography ==
=== Film ===
- Bil Kanoun. 2014
- Al Mashhad Al Akhir. 2005

=== Television ===
- Khtarab El Hay - Fadi. 2014
- Game of the Death. 2013
- The Victors 2. 2012
- Stability and Plant. 2009
- Sarah. 2009

=== Dubbing roles ===
- 1001 Nights
- The Amazing World of Gumball - Rocky Robinson (second voice), Mr. Steve Small (third voice)
- Baby Looney Tunes - Baby Daffy (Lebanese dub)
- Batman: The Animated Series (Lebanese dub)
- Camp Lazlo - Lazlo
- Codename: Kids Next Door (Lebanese dubbing)
- Craig of the Creek - Craig (Lebanese dubbing)
- Dexter's Laboratory - Valhallen (Image Production House version)
- Digimon Fusion - Mikey Kudo
- Firebreather
- Foster's Home for Imaginary Friends - Bloo
- Kim Possible - Erik
- Mokhtarnameh - Mondher
- Prophet Joseph
- Puppy in My Pocket: Adventures in Pocketville
- Rated A for Awesome - Lester Awesome
- Rekkit Rabbit - Yoshimi
- Tom and Jerry Tales - Tom Cat
- Uncle Grandpa
- Wabbit - Cal
- Yu-Gi-Oh! GX - Jaden Yuki
