= Taxi Ballad =

- Film poster
- Arabic: تاكسي البلد
- Directed by: Daniel Joseph
- Written by: Daniel Joseph
- Starring: Talal El-Jordi
- Release dates: December 2011 (Dubai International Film Festival); March 8, 2012 (Lebanon)
- Countries: Lebanon; United States; United Arab Emirates
- Languages: Arabic; English
- Box office: $111,686

Taxi Ballad (Arabic: تاكسي البلد) is a 2011 Lebanese comedy drama film directed by Daniel Joseph.

== Plot ==
The film is made in a social context Comedy, a daily life of Beirut city through a young person suffering from frustration and Seeking to emigrate to America in search of a better future, or his failure to fulfill his dream, He decides that the taxi driver working and loves his profession, he discovers shortly after he began composed with city life and cares about the feelings of the people during the talking.

== Cast ==
- Hiam Abou Chedid as Mother
- Habib Alberto as Ghassan the violinist
- Sahar Assaf as Farah
- Adnan Awad as Adnan the barber
- Firas Barakat as Young Youssef
- Khalil Bou Khalil as Abu Talal
- Badih Abou Chakra as Kamal
- Khaled El Sayed as Cafe Owner
- Talal El-Jordi as Youssef
- Wafa Celine Halawi as Farah's Sister
- Karina Logue as Jordan
- Mahmoud Mabsout as Abu Tony
- Linda Mahdi as Yasmine Haidar
- Ziad Makouk as Abu Omar
- Manel Mallat as Singing Passenger
- Omar Mikati as Old man in cab
- Aïda Sabra as Auntie
- Bakhos Safi as Carlo
- Tarek Tamim as Tarek
- Andre Bou Zeidas as Andre
