= Sarah (TV series) =

- Genre: Soap opera
- Created by: Claudia Marchalian
- Directed by: Samir Habchy
- Starring: Cyrine Abdelnour; Youssef El Khal; Youssef Haddad
- Opening theme: Drama
- Country of origin: Lebanon
- Original language: Arabic
- No. of seasons: 2
- No. of episodes: 30

Production
- Executive producer: Claudia Marchalian
- Running time: approx. 45 minutes
- Production company: Marwa Group

Original release
- Network: Murr Television
- Release: October 19, 2009 – July 19, 2010

Sarah (Arabic: سارة) is a Lebanese soap opera starring Cyrine Abdelnour, Youssef El Khal and Youssef Haddad. It covers the life of a Lebanese woman.

== Episodes ==
Season one aired 15 episodes from October 19, 2009, to January 26, 2010. Season two debuted on February 23, 2010.

== Cast ==
- Cyrine Abdelnour
- Youssef El Khal
- Youssef Haddad
- Pamela El Kik
- Majdi Machmouchi
- Nada Abou Farhat
- Joelle Frenn
- Imad Feghaly
- Anne Marie Salemeh
- Layla Kamari
- Wadad Jabbour
- Janah Fakhoury
- Mona Karim
- Muhammad Ibrahim

== International release ==
Country / Region	Channel	Series premiere	Language
Lebanon	Murr Television Local	November 11, 2009	Arabic
Arab League, Europe, Americas, Australia	Murr Television Satellite	November 18, 2009	Arabic
Egypt	Melody Drama	June 2010	Arabic
Arab League	LBC SAT	August 2010	Arabic
Arab League	Syria Drama	May 2011	Arabic
Arab League	MBC Drama	July 2011	Arabic
