= Omar Mikati =

Lebanese actor and voice actor (born 1944)

- عمر ميقاتي
- Born: 1944 (age 81–82)
- Occupations: Actor, voice actor

Omar Nizar Mikati (Arabic: عمر ميقاتي) is a Lebanese actor and voice actor. Omar Nizar Mikati was born in Lebanon in 1944.

== Filmography ==
=== Film ===
- The Blind of the Cathedral - Grocer (Short Film). 2015
- Max w Antar. 2016
- Princess of Rome (Voice only). 2015
- Don't Tell Me the Boy Was Mad - Narguiz. 2015
- Tuff Incident. 2007
- Taxi Ballad - Old man in cab. 2001

=== Television ===
- Noktit Hob. 2015
- The Team - Abo Omar. 2011
- Scenario - Rouba's father. 2011
- Dr. Hala. 2008

Metel El Amar 2016

=== Dubbing roles ===
- Mokhtarnameh
- Prophet Joseph - Ankh Mahoo
- Saint Mary
- The Men of Angelos

== Awards ==
Year	Award	Nominee/Work	Category	Result	Ref
2010	Murex d'Or	Himself	Best Actor	Won	
