= Mona Karim =

Lebanese actress

- منى كريم
- Occupation: Actress

Mona Ferial Karim (Arabic: منى فريال كريم) is a Lebanese actress.

== Filmography ==
=== Television ===
- Noktit Hob. 2010
- Maitri Nada. 2010
- Wajaa El Rouh. 2014
- Sarah. 2009

== Sources ==
- http://www.annahar.com/article/118479-منى-كريم-لالنهار-أريد-من-زوجي-أن-يطلقني
- http://www.amwagenews.com/?p=18856
- http://www.elfann.com/news/show/1065463/منى-كريم-تستذكر-هلا-المر-والدتها-فريال-كريم-أسمع-د
- http://www.al-akhbar.com/node/115380
- http://www.aljaras.com/ليليان-نمري-وابنة-فريال-كريم-الليلة-تت/
- http://www.imdb.com/name/nm8282110/
- http://www.fanoos.com/society/mona_karim.html
- http://www.elcinema.com/person/1007854
