= Dr. Hala =

- Genre: Drama
- Written by: Claudia Marchalian
- Directed by: Ghaby Saad
- Starring: Rita Barsona; Peter Semaan; Muhammad Ibrahim
- Country of origin: Lebanon
- Original language: Arabic
- No. of seasons: 1
- No. of episodes: 30

Production
- Producer: Marwan Haddad
- Production company: Marwa Group

Original release
- Network: MTV Lebanon
- Release: January 2009

Dr. Hala (Arabic: دكتور هلا) is a Lebanese television series produced in 2009 by Marwa Group. The series was written by Claudia Marchalian.

== Plot ==
The plot sorounds Hala (Rita Barsona), from whom the show gets its name, and had bad emotional experiences in her youth. As an adult, she ignored love to focus on study and work, until she met the journalist Ghadi (Peter Semaan), with whom she falls love. However, after a former lover Nadeem (Muhammad Ibrahim) returns, Hala lives in a struggle between the past, present and future.

== Cast ==
- Rita Barsona - Hala
- Peter Semaan - Ghadi
- Muhammad Ibrahim - Nadeem
- Youssef Haddad
- Aline Lahoud
- Omar Mikati
- Toni Nseir
- Nada Remi
- Gilles Youssef
- Tarek Yaacoub (Leon)
