= Craig of the Creek =

American animated sitcom

- Genre: Animated sitcom Adventure; Comedy; Slice of life
- Created by: Matt Burnett; Ben Levin
- Voices of: Philip Solomon; Noël Wells; H. Michael Croner
- Composer: Jeff Rosenstock
- Country of origin: United States
- Original language: English
- No. of seasons: 6
- No. of episodes: 180 (list of episodes)

Production
- Executive producers: Matt Burnett; Ben Levin; Curtis Lelash (seasons 1–2); Jennifer Pelphrey (seasons 1–3); Tramm Wigzell (seasons 1–3); Rob Sorcher (seasons 1–3); Brian A. Miller (seasons 1–3); Sam Register (seasons 3–6)
- Producers: Shauna McGarry (season 1); Susy Campos (seasons 3–6)
- Running time: 11 minutes
- Production company: Cartoon Network Studios

Original release
- Network: Cartoon Network
- Release: March 30, 2018 – January 25, 2025

Related
- Craig Before the Creek; Jessica's Big Little World

Craig of the Creek is an American animated sitcom created by Matt Burnett and Ben Levin for Cartoon Network. The show's pilot episode debuted directly on December 1, 2017. The series premiered online on February 19, 2018, with a double-premiere event airing on March 30, 2018.

On February 17, 2021, the series was renewed for a fourth season which premiered on October 25, 2021. On January 19, 2022, the series was renewed for a fifth season, which premiered on July 10, 2023. Additionally, a spin-off Jessica's Big Little World, and a prequel movie titled Craig Before the Creek, have been released.

In October 2022, it was announced that the fifth season of the series would be cut in half by Warner Bros. Discovery. In December 2022, it was announced the show's final episode had been written, and that seven episodes were cut from the fifth season; however, it was announced that the second half of the fifth season would become the sixth and final season of the series, which started airing on June 1, 2024. The series finale aired on January 25, 2025.

== Premise/Setting ==
In the fictional suburban Baltimore-DC area town of Herkleton, Maryland, a boy named Craig Williams and his two friends, Kelsey Pokoly, a young "warrior" girl with an active imagination and a lust for adventure, and "J.P." Mercer, have their many adventures in the titular creek, described as a kid utopia of untamed wilderness in which tribes of children reign over tree forts and dirt bike ramps. In season four, they are joined by Omar, a quiet, but very adventurous boy. The four of them attend different schools with the Creek being the only thing that brings them together.

== Characters ==
- Craig Williams (voiced by Philip Solomon) – A 10-year-old African-American boy who enjoys playing at the creek with his friends, Kelsey and J.P. He is a natural leader and always tries to help other kids when they need it the most. He has a colorful family that has been the focus of several episodes (such as "King of Camping"). Craig typically carries a homemade staff and a purse, each holding sentimental value. In "Escape From Family Dinner," it is shown that Craig takes advanced math and admits that he likes the class. He also takes on the role of a cartographer as he is constantly making additions to his detailed map of the Creek.
- Kelsey Pokoly (voiced by Georgie Kidder (pilot; season 1, episodes 1–3), Noël Wells (season 1, episodes 4–180) – A ginger-haired, 9-year-old girl who is one of Craig's close friends. She is always seen wearing a purple cape and has a pet budgerigar (which she identifies as a falcon) named Mortimor who is usually perched on top of her head. She typically carries a homemade PVC pipe sword which she proudly made herself partly with the help of a blacksmith. She and her family are implied to be Hungarian in "The Invitation" and "The Last Kid in the Creek" due to her knowledge of Hungarian cuisine; Pokoly, her family name, is likely derived from the Hungarian word "pokoli," meaning "hellish." She is adventurous, loves books, and tends to be overly dramatic. She often internally narrates her life, for which others are completely aware. She is raised by her single widower father. In "Doorway to Helen" it is revealed that Kelsey is Jewish, and in "Fire & Ice" it is revealed that she is a lesbian.
- John Paul (J.P.) Mercer (voiced by H. Michael Croner) – A tall 11-year-old boy who is another one of Craig's close friends. He wears an oversized red hockey jersey. While not shown to be very bright, he is imaginative and kind to those around him. He is prone to getting very dirty and injuring himself. In "Under the Overpass", Craig stated that he and Kelsey "found" J.P. in a previous adventure.

== Episodes ==
Season	Episodes	Originally released	
Season	Episodes	First released	Last released
Pilot		December 1, 2017	
1	40	March 30, 2018	March 11, 2019
2	40	March 18, 2019	June 11, 2020
Shorts	5	November 22, 2019	December 13, 2019
3	40	June 21, 2020	July 2, 2021
4	40	October 25, 2021	May 29, 2023
5	10	July 10, 2023	July 14, 2023
Film		December 11, 2023	
6	10	June 1, 2024	January 25, 2025

== Production ==
=== Development ===
The greenlit announcement was made public on March 30, 2017, alongside other shows such as Apple & Onion and Summer Camp Island. Matt Burnett also stated on his Twitter account that he and his team had recently begun production around that time.

In August 2021, Trammell told Insider that the show's writing room is full of more than 40 people "all with different backgrounds and different experiences, who are willing to share those experiences." He also said the show is different from shows where there is only one person of color in the writing room, stating that since their writing room is open "it never feels like you're the one representative."

=== Music ===
The show's music is composed by Jeff Rosenstock, who specializes in the ska genre. Ben Levin and Matt Burnett are both fans of ska, which is why they wanted Rosenstock for the job.

=== LGBT representation ===
In April 2018, two lesbian characters were confirmed, teenagers Tabitha and Courtney. In their debut episode, "The Curse," Tabitha refuses to go to college and wants to spend time with Courtney. Courtney blushes, and they are holding hands in the end. In "The Haunted Dollhouse," they admit their feelings for each other and kiss.

In December 2019, it was confirmed that the show had a non-binary character, named Angel José. Their voice actor, Angel Lorenzana, who also uses they/them pronouns, an agender storyboard artist for the show, confirmed this. In later tweets, they added that their "cartoon self" used they/them before themselves, gave a shout out to the show's crew, and said that while this was a small contribution to LGBTQ+ representation, they hoped "fans can take comfort knowing that there's also non-binary people working behind the scenes" on every one of the show's episodes. Some praised the show for the number of non-binary characters, comparing it to the apparent number of "non-binary characters" in Steven Universe, where every Gem is "non-binary" (though the Gems are biologically sexless and all use female pronouns).

Other LGBTQ characters appear in the show like J.P.'s openly lesbian older sister, Laura. In the episode "Jextra Perrestrial," she is shown to be in a same-sex relationship with a girl named Kat. Laura is voiced by openly lesbian comedian Fortune Feimster. Raj and Shawn, Honeysuckle Rangers from a neighborhood nearby, are implied to have feelings for each other in several episodes. Raj is voiced by openly gay actor Parvesh Cheena. Also, the episode "Cousin of the Creek," Jasmine tells her cousin "I'm texting my girlfriend, mind your business."

The season 4 episode "Fire & Ice" focuses on Kelsey and Stacks' relationship as they confessed their love to each other. At the end of another season 4 episode, "Silver Fist Returns," Cat Burglar (Secret Keeper) is revealed to be gay and has a crush on George of The Tea Timers. George blushes and asks him out and he accepts, making them officially a couple. Secret Keeper is voiced by non-binary actor Cole Escola.

== Broadcast ==
=== Release ===
On July 15, 2019, it was announced that the series was renewed for a third season which premiered on June 21, 2020. It was later renewed for a fourth season on February 17, 2021, which premiered on October 25, 2021, and a fifth season on January 19, 2022, which premiered on July 10, 2023. In October 2022, it was announced that the fifth season will be cut in half by Warner Bros. Discovery. In December 2022, it was announced the series finished production and seven episodes were cut from the fifth season.

On May 2, 2022, the show also began airing reruns on Cartoon Network's sister channel, Boomerang.

The show left Boomerang on October 28, 2022, along with Teen Titans Go!, The Amazing World of Gumball, and Total DramaRama, as those shows still air on Cartoon Network.

=== International broadcast ===
The series made its international debut on Teletoon in Canada on May 3, 2018. In most countries in Europe and Latin America, it airs on Cartoon Network.

== Home media ==
Craig of the Creek home video releases
Seasons		Episodes	Release dates
Seasons		Episodes	United States
1	2019	13	March 19, 2019; Episodes: "Itch to Explore" – "Lost in the Sewers"
Australia
1 – 3	2021	120	Seasons 1 - 3 DVD: October 6, 2021; Episodes: "Itch to Explore" – "Capture the Flag Part 5: The Game"

== Reception ==
=== Critical reception ===
The series was received positively from critics. Doug Wallen of The Guardian wrote "series slots in comfortably alongside current animated shows like Hilda and Bluey. It becomes all the more endearing as one keeps watching, thanks in part to savvy pop-culture references and repeated callbacks to past episodes. The setting may be a fictionalised version of the Baltimore/Washington DC area, but the thickly forested, adventure-rich backdrop could be anywhere. No matter who you are or what you're going through, escape is always just as close as the creek."

Omar Holmon of Blacknerdproblems.com said that show "Re-examines what it's like for kids using their imaginations. Who knew you could still use one of those without an internet connection? I'm putting my faith in Craig of The Creek in these trying times."

Emily Ashby of Common Sense Media described the series as "appealing" with its "affirming messages." She also argued that the series had recurring themes of "creativity, joy, adventure, individuality, and self-discovery."

=== Awards and nominations ===
Award	Year	Category	Nominee(s)	Result	Ref.
Annie Award	2019	Outstanding Achievement for Writing in an Animated Television/Broadcast Production	Matt Burnett, Ben Levin, Shauna McGarry, Jeff Trammell and Tiffany Ford (for "Escape From Family Dinner")	Nominated	
Annie Award	2021	Outstanding Achievement for Character Design in an Animated Television/Broadcast Production	Danny Hynes	Nominated	
Annie Award	2021	Outstanding Achievement for Writing in an Animated Television/Broadcast Production	Jeff Trammell, Tiffany Ford, Dashawn Mahone and Najja Porter	Nominated	
Annie Award	2025	Outstanding Achievement for Writing in an Animated Television/Broadcast Production	Harron Atkins, Lorraine DeGraffenreidt, Pearl Low, and Richie Pope (for "Whose Dimension Is It Anyway?")	Nominated	
Children's and Family Emmy Awards	2023	Outstanding Writing for an Animated Program	Matt Burnett, Ben Levin, Jeff Trammell, Dashawn Mahone, Najja Porter, Deena Beck and Ashleigh Hairston	Nominated	
Children's and Family Emmy Awards	2025	Outstanding Writing for an Animated Program	Harron Atkins, Lorraine DeGraffenreidt, Matt Burnett, Ben Levin, Dashawn Mahone, Najja Porter, Jason Dwyer, Leiana Nitura, Ifesinachi Orjiekwe, Ashley Tahilana and Jones Wiedle (for "Heart of the Forest")	Nominated	
Common Sense Media	2018	Common Sense Seal	Craig of the Creek	Won	
Daytime Emmy Award	2020	Outstanding Children's Animated Series	Craig of the Creek	Nominated	
Daytime Emmy Award	2021	Outstanding Children's Animated Series	Craig of the Creek	Nominated	
GLAAD Media Award	2021	Outstanding Kids & Family Programming	Craig of the Creek	Nominated	
GLAAD Media Award	2023	Outstanding Kids and Family Programming - Animated	Craig of the Creek	Nominated	
GLAAD Media Award	2024	Outstanding Kids and Family Programming - Animated	Craig of the Creek	Nominated	
NAACP Image Awards	2021	Outstanding Children's Program	Craig of the Creek	Nominated	
NAACP Image Awards	2024	Outstanding Children's Program	Craig of the Creek	Nominated	
NAACP Image Awards	2025	Outstanding Children's Program	Craig of the Creek	Nominated	

== Other media ==
=== Spin-off ===
On February 17, 2021, it was announced that a preschool spin-off series centered on Craig's little sister Jessica was in development. Titled Jessica's Big Little World, the new series was set to air as part of Cartoon Network's Cartoonito preschool block. On January 19, 2022, it was announced that the series would premiere in 2023.

In October 2022, it was announced that the first season of the spin-off would be cut in half by Warner Bros. Discovery. In July 2023, it was announced the series would air as part of the regular Cartoon Network schedule, in addition to Cartoonito. A sneak peek of the series aired on September 20, 2023, and officially premiered on October 2, 2023.

In November 2023, it was reported that the series would end after its first season.

=== Prequel film ===
An origin film, Craig Before the Creek, was announced on January 19, 2022, and was released on digital on December 11, 2023, and on DVD on March 26, 2024. The film aired on Cartoon Network on January 13, 2024. The events of the film take place before the first episode of the series.
