= LGBTQ rights in Lebanon =

- Lebanon
- Legal status: Ambiguous (Note: Some courts have ruled that LGBT people shouldn't be arrested under Article 534 of the Lebanese Penal Code, which prohibits sexual relations that "contradict the laws of nature", but this law is still used to persecute LGBT people and hasn't been completely struck down yet.)
- Penalty: Up to one year of imprisonment.
- Gender identity: Ambiguous
- Military: No
- Discrimination protections: No

Family rights
- Recognition of relationships: No recognition of same-sex unions
- Adoption: No (Note: Adoption is very difficult for much of the population of Lebanon, not only same-sex couples.)

Lesbian, gay, bisexual, transgender, and queer (LGBTQ) people living in Lebanon face discrimination and legal difficulties not experienced by non-LGBT residents. Various courts have ruled that Article 534 of the Lebanese Penal Code, which prohibits having sexual relations that "contradict the laws of nature", should not be used to arrest LGBT people. Nonetheless, the law is still being used to harass and persecute LGBT people through occasional police arrests, in which detainees are sometimes subject to intrusive physical examinations.

== Legality of same-sex sexual activity ==
Article 534 of the Lebanese Penal Code prohibits having sexual relations "contradicting the laws of nature," which is punishable by up to a year in prison. As a practical matter, enforcement of the law had been varied and often occurred through occasional police arrests. In 2012 the ISF raided a cinema house that screened pornographic films in a diverse working-class neighborhood of metro Beirut, arresting thirty-six people for violating public decency and engaging in unnatural sexual behavior. At the police station, the public prosecutor ordered anal examinations on the detainees to determine whether they had been anally penetrated during sex with another man. In 2002, the police broke into a woman's house after her mother claimed that her daughter had stolen some money and jewelry. Upon entering the house, the police found the woman having sexual relations with another woman and charged them both with the crime of sodomy.

In 2007, Judge Mounir Suleiman called a halt to a criminal investigation of two men arrested under Article 534. He disputed that homosexuality was "contrary to the rules of nature" and noted that what was seen as "unnatural" reflected the social mores of the time.

On 11 December 2009, the Lebanon-based LGBT organization Helem launched a report that would target the legal situation of homosexuals in the Middle East and North Africa. In 2011, a Lebanese judge in Batroun ruled against the use of Article 534 to prosecute homosexuals.

In 2012, then Justice Minister Shakib Qortbawi weighed in on the use of anal examinations on men accused of same-sex conduct, issuing a statement calling for an end to this practice. Local and transnational LGBTQ and human rights activists and groups launched a campaign against the use of forced anal examinations as tests for homosexual sex. The exams, often coupled with compulsory HIV tests, were framed as a form of torture conducted on men suspected of engaging in sex with other men.

In April 2013, the Mayor of Dekwaneh, a suburb north of Beirut, ordered security forces to raid and shut down a gay-friendly nightclub. Several club-goers were arrested and forced to undress in the municipal headquarters, where they were then photographed naked. This operation was condemned by numerous gay rights activists. Lebanon's Interior Minister of the Interim Government, Marwan Charbel, supported the Mayor of Dekwaneh saying, "Lebanon is opposed to homosexuality, and according to Lebanese law it is a criminal offense."

On 11 July 2013, the Lebanese Psychiatric Society (LPS) released a statement saying that homosexuality is not a mental disorder and does not need to be treated, they said: "Homosexuality in itself does not cause any defect in judgment, stability, reliability or social and professional abilities... The assumption that homosexuality is a result of disturbances in the family dynamic or unbalanced psychological development is based on wrong information." Also, the LPS stated that conversion therapy, seeking to "convert" gays and bisexuals into straights has no scientific background and asked health professionals to "rely only on science" when giving opinion and treatment in this matter. This made Lebanon the first Arab country to declassify homosexuality as a "disease".

From 29 November to 1 December 2013, an independent group organized TransFocus, "an independent film festival that revolves around trans* and gender-variant topics, questions, persons, and politics in Lebanon." The three-day event was non-profit, funded via online crowdsourcing, and was carried out by a "bunch of friends and local organizers" aimed to be "outside any institution, organization or collective; international or local." The event featured film screenings, a focused discussion panel, a resource collection project, and an exhibition. This marked the first Lebanese public film festival focusing on trans voices and topics.

On 28 January 2014, a court in the municipality of Jdeideh threw out a case against a transgender woman accused of having an "unnatural" sexual relationship with a man.

In January 2017, a Lebanese judge challenged the legal basis of the arrest of men for same-sex conduct. In his ruling, Judge Maalouf referred to a penal code provision protecting freedom of expression, Article 183, which states that "an act undertaken in exercise of a right without abuse shall not be regarded as an offense... If no harm is done, there is no crime," the judge wrote in his decision. In 2016, a Lebanese misdemeanors court issued a ruling that Article 534 of the criminal code does not apply to gay sex because gay sex is not unnatural, which was seen as a significant victory for gay rights and activism in the country.

Despite these rulings, Article 534 of the Penal Code still stands. Georges Azzi, executive director of the Arab Foundation for Freedoms and Equality, told the Washington Blade in 2017: "Homosexuality is technically illegal in Lebanon, however the new generation of judges are less likely to apply the law and the police forces will not reinforce it." In August 2014, the Internal Security Forces Morals Protection Bureau conducted a raid on a Turkish bathhouse in Beirut, resulting in the arrest of 27 Syrians. According to a report co-produced with Helem, the stated reason for the raid was the suspected "presence of homosexual individuals." In May 2016, LGBT activists staged a sit-in, demanding Article 534 be repealed.

In March 2018, the Kataeb Party, a minor Christian party, expressed support for the decriminalisation of homosexuality and the repeal of Article 534. Local LGBT activists welcomed the support, stating that this was the first time a political party in Parliament had endorsed their cause.

In July 2018, the Penal Appeal Court of Mount Lebanon upheld a lower court ruling which acquitted nine people prosecuted over being gay. The lower court held that homosexuality was "a practice of their fundamental rights." The Appeal Court agreed and found that consensual sex between same-sex partners cannot be considered "unnatural" so long as it does not violate morality and ethics, such as "when it is seen or heard by others, or performed in a public place, or involving a minor who must be protected." Activists welcomed the ruling and called on the Government to repeal Article 534. This ruling was the fifth of its kind in Lebanon, and the first from such a high-level court.

In 2019, Military Court Judge Peter Germanos acquitted four military personnel accused of "sodomy" in a landmark ruling, clearing the group of charges of committing sexual acts "contrary to nature" and declaring that sodomy is "not punishable by law."

On 24 June 2022, during Pride Month, the Caretaker Minister of Interior Bassam Mawlawi ordered the Internal Security Forces and GS to "immediately take the necessary measures to prevent any type of celebration, meeting or gathering" by the LGBT community following pressure by religious authorities in the country, while declaring: "This phenomenon [Homosexuality] is contrary to the habits and customs of our society" and religious principles, Mawlawi said, adding that "personal freedoms cannot be invoked." A few days later, the Lebanese Psychiatric Association released a statement stressing their position on homosexuality, stating: "as psychiatrists, we would like to clarify that homosexuality cannot be considered a disease that requires treatment". In August, the Legal Agenda and Helem argued before the Shura Council, the country's top administrative court, that Bassam Mawlawi's ban incited violence and hatred against marginalized groups and violated LGBTQ people's constitutional rights to equality, free expression, and free assembly. On 1 November, the Shura Council accepted the appeal and froze Bassam Mawlawi's decision.

On 22 July 2023, secretary-general of Hezbollah, Hassan Nasrallah, declared a cultural war on the LGBT community in Lebanon, stating that homosexuality is exported to the Lebanese society from the United States and Europe, and called for capital punishment to be imposed on individuals found guilty of sodomy. He called this cultural war a "Christian-Islamic war for all the Lebanese", and called for the rejection of the word homosexuals, describing them as "abnormal" and "deviant." He said that "[Homosexuality] must be confronted [...] by all means and by seeking the help of specialists for treatment." This declaration of war was seen by Widad Jarbouh, a researcher and journalist at the Samir Kassir Foundation, as "politicians escaping from their responsibilities for the state of collapse that the country is witnessing at many levels, by targeting marginalized groups, including members of the LGBT community," referring to the ongoing severe Lebanese economic crisis.

A district court of appeal in Lebanon ruled, on 20 August 2023, that consensual sex between people of the same sex is not unlawful and should not be criminalized under Lebanese law, Human Rights Watch said. The ruling follows similar judgments from lower courts that have declined to convict gay and transgender people of "sexual intercourse contrary to nature" in four separate rulings between 2007 and 2017. It is the first such ruling from an appeals court and moves Lebanon further toward decriminalizing homosexual conduct in Lebanon. "This ruling signals a new horizon for lesbian, gay, bisexual, and transgender people in Lebanon, who have long been persecuted under discriminatory laws," said Neela Ghoshal, senior researcher on lesbian, gay, bisexual, and transgender (LGBT) rights at Human Rights Watch. "The court has effectively ordered the state to get out of people's bedrooms."

== Gender identity and expression ==
In January 2016, the Court of Appeals of Beirut confirmed the right of a transgender man to change his official papers, granting him access to necessary treatment and privacy. Transgender people are required to undergo sex reassignment surgery in order to change their legal gender.

== Blood donation ==
Men who have had sexual contact with another man are permanently banned from donating blood in Lebanon.

== LGBT social movements ==
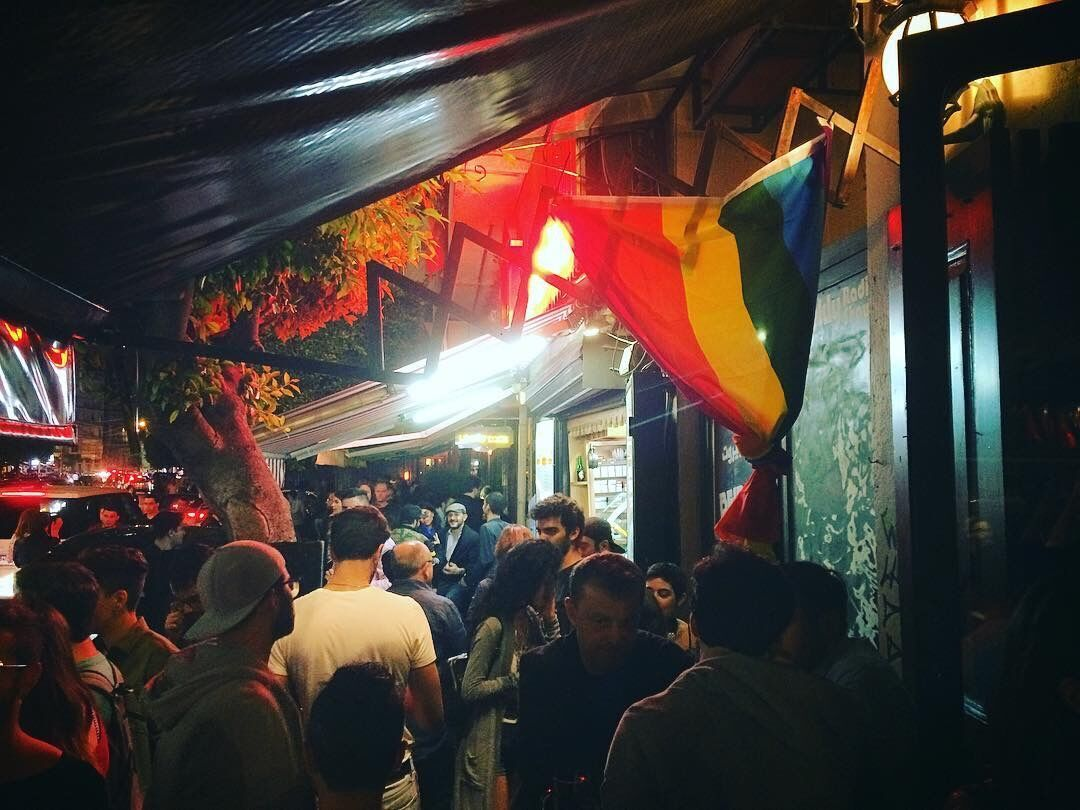
A rainbow flag flying in a street in Mar Mikhaël, Beirut in 2017

Members of the LGBT Lebanese community began to publicly campaign for LGBT rights in 2002, with the creation of a political association called Hurriyyat Khassa ("Private Liberties" in English). The group focused its efforts on reforming Article 534 of the Criminal Code so that private sex acts between consenting adults would no longer be a crime. Another LGBT rights organization in Lebanon is called Helem (Arabic: حلم, meaning "Dream" in Arabic). These organizations have staged public demonstrations, lectures and fundraisers for HIV/AIDS education.

In 2006, Helem celebrated the International Day Against Homophobia, Transphobia and Biphobia in Monroe Hotel Downtown in Beirut.

In August 2007, a lesbian NGO named Meem was founded to support lesbian, bisexual, transgender, queer and questioning women in Lebanon. The group offers community support, psychological counselling, an activity center, legal support, social events, and the opportunity to work on social change. Meem also hosts a Womyn House that serves as an activity and resource center in Beirut.

The inaugural Beirut Pride was planned for 21 May 2017, but LGBT activists were forced to hold a private event due to fear of violence from police and radical Islamists. In 2018, the organizer of Beirut Pride, Hadi Damien, was arrested. The Prosecutor of Beirut suspended all the scheduled events, and initiated criminal proceedings against Hadi for organizing events that "incite to debauchery".

Lebanese communities in the Diaspora (Europe, North America, Latin America, Australia) have also established visibility and presence through Helem LGBT affiliates in various cities with big Lebanese presence including Montreal (where Helem has obtained legal registration) and Paris.

Lebanon is considerably more tolerant of homosexuality than neighboring Arab countries. Several gay night clubs have operated in Beirut, and some people there live as openly gay. Drag artist and comedian Bassem Feghali is considered a pioneer of the Lebanese drag scene and a major inspiration for Lebanese drag queens such as Anya Kneez and Evita Kedavra. Feghali has been performing on Lebanese television since 1996 and is especially popular throughout the Arab world for her parodies of well-known female pop singers.

=== LGBT publications ===
Lebanon is the first Arab country with its own gay periodical, entitled Barra ("Out" in Arabic). A trial issue was published in March 2005 with two full issues that followed in summer 2005 and spring 2006.

A Lebanese LGBT group, Helem, also has its own website including a regular online newsletter publication.

In 2009, "Bareed Mista3jil" was published by the Lebanese lesbian Feminist Collective (FC) organization in Beirut. The organization is also called Nasawiya and is a group of activists who are involved in gender justice work. Available in both English and Arabic versions, the book is a collection of 41 true and personal stories from lesbians, bisexuals, queer and questioning women and transgender persons from all over Lebanon. The book was launched in Masrah Al Madina, Beirut by the Feminist Collective and IndyAct.

On 23 August 2023, a Beirut drag show faced disruption by conservative Christians' homophobic chants, reflecting rising LGBTQ+ intolerance in Lebanon. Amnesty International urged government protection for all.

== Politics ==
For a while, only the Kataeb Party endorsed the decriminalisation of homosexuality. None of the major or minor political parties or factions publicly endorsed any of the goals of the gay rights organizations. In 2018, Kollouna Watani, which ran 66 candidates in the election endorsed the decriminalisation of homosexuality. Dozens of other candidates also called for decriminalization.

On 1 September 2020, Martine Najem Kteily, the vice president for management in the Free Patriotic Movement (FPM) said in an interview that the major Christian party endorses the abolishment of the Article 534 of the Lebanese Penal Code and supports the decriminalization of homosexuality.

=== Freedom of speech and expression ===
While there were initial reports of government censorship of LGBT themes, there has been a degree of liberalization in recent years.

On 29 May 2006, Al Arabiya ran a piece in which Beirut Municipality Council member Saad-Eddine Wazzan publicly called on Prime Minister Fouad Sanyoura and Minister of Interior Ahmad Fatfat to shut down Helem. On 16 June 2006, sermons in the mosques of Beirut condemned homosexuality and pointed to the fact that Beirut has a licensed LGBT organization called Helem. The sermons also called on the Government to provide explanations. The following day, Ahmed Fatfat denied charges by Islamist clerics that the Government had approved a gay rights group. In 2017, LGBT activists organised Lebanon's first pride parade, named Beirut Pride, but were forced to cancel due to terrorist threats from Islamic radicals. The 2018 event was banned after the main organiser was arrested by police officials. The move was condemned by Human Rights Watch, which said: "The crackdown violates freedom of assembly and association and is a step backward in a country that has made progress toward respecting the rights of LGBT people."

==== Media campaigns ====
In May 2016, Proud Lebanon, a Lebanese non-profit organization, marked the International Day Against Homophobia, Transphobia and Biphobia (IDAHOT) by launching a media campaign. The campaign consisted of an awareness ad featuring several prominent Lebanese artists and celebrities calling on the Lebanese Government to provide equal rights to all citizens and residents regardless of sexual orientation, nationality, etc. The ad makes particular emphasis on the rights of the LGBT community to live in a society free of homophobia, since LGBT individuals may still face wide prejudice, coming mainly from conservatives or clerics.

== Public opinion ==
A poll conducted by the Pew Research Center in 2007 showed that 79% of Lebanese believed that "homosexuality should be rejected by society", as opposed to 18% who believed "homosexuality should be accepted by society". Younger people were more likely to support acceptance, with 27% in favor, than those between 30 and 49 (17%) and those over 50 (10%).

In May 2015, PlanetRomeo, an LGBT social network, published its first Gay Happiness Index (GHI). Gay men from over 120 countries were asked about how they feel about society's view on homosexuality, how do they experience the way they are treated by other people and how satisfied are they with their lives. Lebanon was ranked 99th with a GHI score of 33.

According to a 2017 World Values Survey, 48% said they would not accept a homosexual neighbour, while 52% of Lebanese respondents said they would not mind if they had a homosexual neighbour, making Lebanon the highest-ranking Arab country surveyed and the second-highest-ranking Muslim-majority country after Pakistan.

According to a 2019 survey conducted by the Arab Barometer, 8% of respondents considered honour killings acceptable, compared to 6% who accepted homosexuality. Another 2019 survey found that 32% of Lebanese between 15 and 80 years had severe homophobic attitudes, with more tolerance correlated with knowing someone gay, university education, high monthly income, and higher problem-focused engagement.

On November 17, 2026, An-Nahar published a front page editorial in cooperation of IMPACT BBDO demanding legal changes of the penal code against LGBTQ+, making it a rare occasion in a region where LGBTQ+ relationships are widely criminalized.

== Summary table ==
Same-sex sexual activity	Yes / No The law banning sexual acts that are "against nature" is in place still with up to a year in prison. However it is not well enforced and is not always prosecuted.
Equal age of consent	No
Anti-discrimination laws in employment	No
Anti-discrimination laws in the provision of goods and services	No
Anti-discrimination laws in all other areas (incl. indirect discrimination, hate speech)	No
Hate crime laws covering both sexual orientation and gender identity	No
Recognition of same-sex couples	No
Same-sex marriages	No
Stepchild adoption by same-sex couples	No
Joint adoption by same-sex couples	No
Gay, lesbian, and bisexual people allowed to serve in the military	No
Right to change legal gender	Yes (Since 2016)
Third gender option	No
Access to IVF for lesbian couples	No
Commercial surrogacy for gay male couples	No
Homosexuality declassified as an illness	Yes (since 2013)
MSMs allowed to donate blood	No
Gay criminal records expunged	No

== Notable LGBT people from Lebanon ==
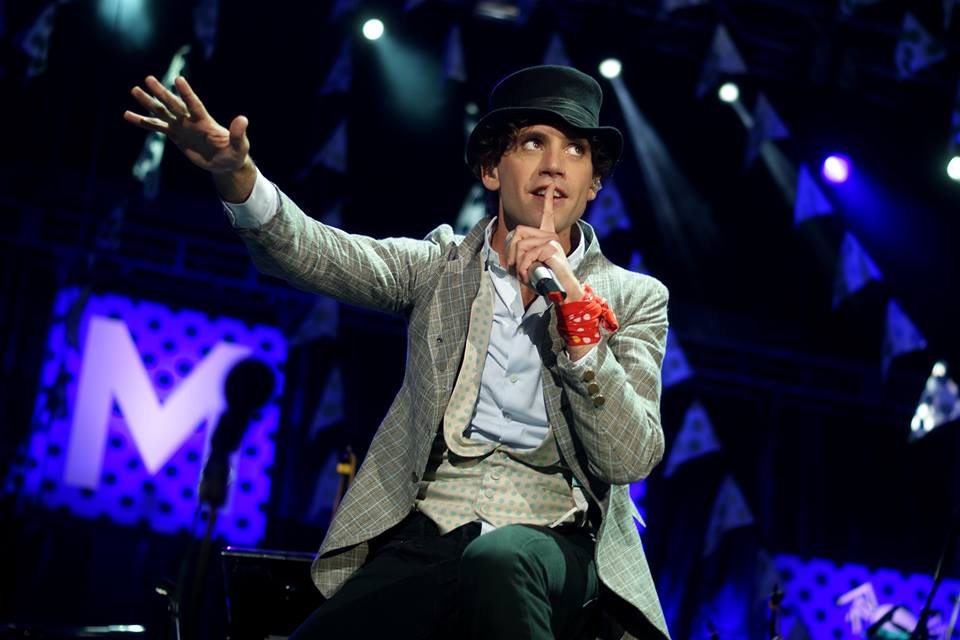
High-profile Lebanese singer Mika came out as gay in 2012.

- Etel Adnan (1925–2021), poet, essayist, and visual artist
- Rabih Alameddine (born 1959), painter and writer
- Dayna Ash, Cultural and LGBT rights activist
- Georges Azzi (born 1979), activist and co-founder of Helem
- Mousbah Baalbaki, male belly dancer
- Simone Fattal (born 1942), artist
- Peter Macdissi (born 1974), actor and executive producer
- Sandra Melhem, LGBT rights activist
- Mika (born 1983), singer-songwriter
- Hamed Sinno (born 1988), singer
- Haaz Sleiman (born 1976), actor

== See also ==
- Human rights in Lebanon
- LGBTQ rights in Asia
- LGBTQ rights in the Middle East
