= Beirut Pride =

Annual LGBT event in Lebanon

Beirut Pride بيروت تفتخر
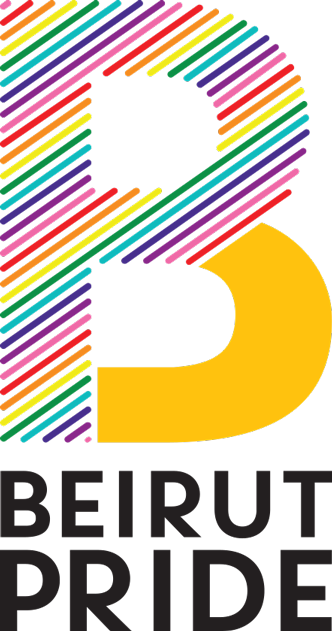
- The logo of Beirut Pride, a playful mix of the initials B and P, designed by agency /lorem ipsum/. The letter P is made with the hatches of the original rainbow flag 8 colors that a solid base turns into the B of Beirut.

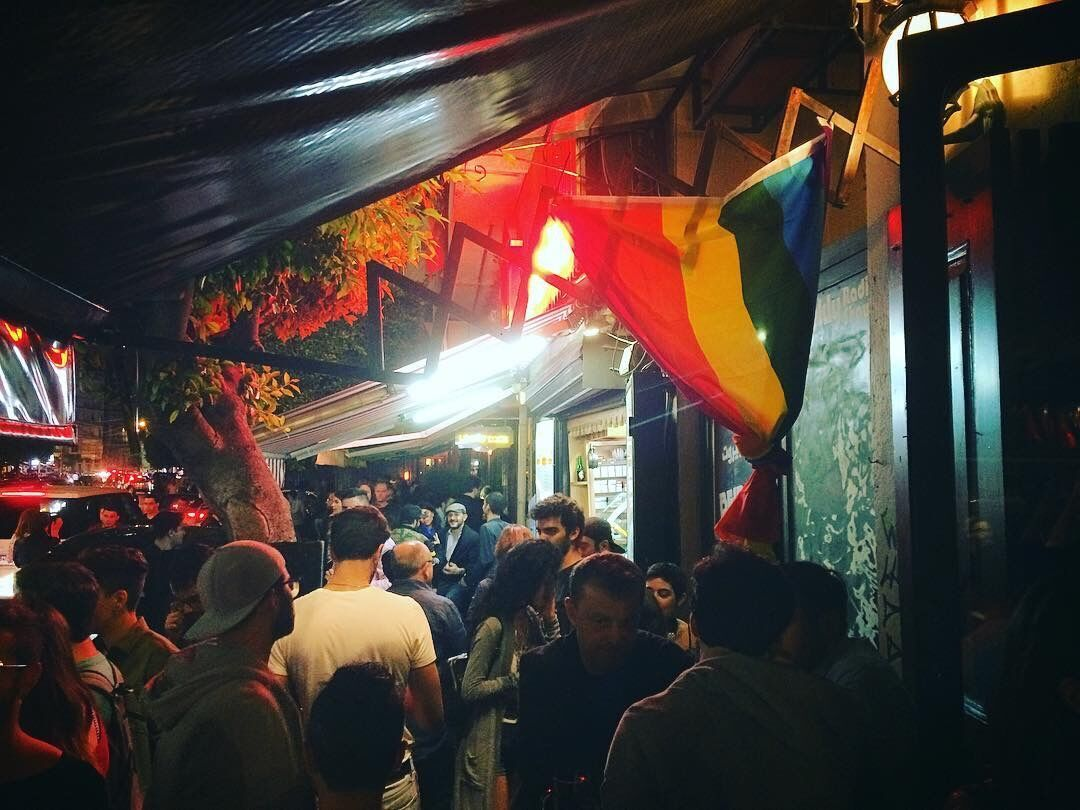
- A rainbow flag flying in Mar Mikhaël in 2017
- Status: Active
- Genre: Pride, Demonstration, Festival, Conference, Concerts, Exhibitions, etc.
- Frequency: Annually since 2017
- Location: Several venues in Beirut
- Country: Lebanon
- Years active: 9
- Founded: 2017
- Founder: Hadi Damien
- Next event: 2026
- Participants: 4,000 in 2017; 2,700 during the first three days of 2018
- Area: National and overseas
- Filing status: Non-profit
- Member: Interpride
- Website: www.beirutpride.org

Beirut Pride (Arabic: فخر بيروت, romanized: Fakhr Bayrūt) is the annual non-profit LGBTQIA+ event and march held in Beirut, the capital of Lebanon. Established with the mission to advocate for the decriminalization of homosexuality within Lebanon, the event serves as a platform for fostering visibility, acceptance, and equality for the queer community in the region.

Since its establishment in 2017, Beirut Pride has stood as the Arab world's pioneering and singular LGBTQIA+ pride event, marking the largest gathering within the LGBTQIA+ community in the Arab world. The inaugural event attracted 4,000 attendees, and the momentum continued into the 2018 edition, drawing 2,700 participants in its initial three days. However, authorities intervened, leading to the arrest of its founder, Hadi Damien.

The subsequent day, the Beirut prosecutor intervened by suspending the planned activities and initiating criminal proceedings against Damien for orchestrating events deemed to "incite debauchery." Despite this setback, Beirut Pride persisted, with its third edition unfolding in September/October 2019. The fourth edition adapted to the evolving circumstances, transitioning to an online format in 2020. This shift was prompted by both COVID-19 restrictions and the economic turmoil engulfing Beirut, necessitating participation in the online Global Pride celebration.

== History ==
The global progress in the realm of LGBTQIA+ rights catalyzed Hadi Damien, then 28 years old, to initiate the groundwork for Beirut Pride in August 2016. Damien embarked on a collaborative journey by recognizing the necessity for a comprehensive communication platform spanning multiple days, languages, and engaging with the universal language of creativity.

== Beirut Pride 2017 ==
The inaugural edition of Beirut Pride unfolded from May 14 to 21, 2017, strategically aligning with the International Day Against Homophobia.

Additionally, legal seminars provided insights while the unveiling of three specially designed t-shirts by Bashar Assaf and Marwan Kaabour added a creative flair. The festivities extended into the nightlife of Mar Mikhaël, where eighteen bars proudly displayed rainbow flags, culminating in a spirited drag show and celebratory party. Initially planned as a march on May 21, enthusiasm necessitated a relocation to a mountainside venue overlooking the Mediterranean. Notably, several embassies prominently displayed rainbow flags in solidarity with Beirut Pride.

This edition faced challenged when NGOs Proud Lebanon and Helem encountered a boycott campaign initiated by certain organisations urging authorities to halt their respective events. Both organisations had organised full conference days featuring performances, discussions, and screenings. However, Proud Lebanon's hotel reservation was abruptly canceled, prompting Helem to transform its event into a closed conference streamed on social media. This strategic shift aimed to mitigate the risk of potential violence and safeguard the safety of attendees and Lebanese society at large.

== Beirut Pride 2018 ==
The second edition of Beirut Pride was scheduled for May 12–20, 2018. It started with a brunch in honor of the parents who did not kick their LGBT children from the family house because of their sexual orientation or gender identity. The opening party brought 800 persons who sang and cheered to the performance of Lebanese singer and dancer Khansa, acclaimed Sudanese Brooklyn-based music band "Alsarah and the Nubatones", and danced to the disco music until the early morning hours. A Sunday brunch at the independent art incubator "Haven for Artists" featured a talk about trans-identity, followed by a talk with migrant workers about masculinity and femininity, before the massive Beirut Grand Ball. Additionally, Beirut Pride announced the Corporate Pledge project it was developing: a policy for corporations not to discriminate against staff and clients based on their sexuality and identity. Moreover, performances, talks, a gender-fluid fashion show and parties were programmed, a podcast and a magazine were ready to be launched. However, on the third night, Monday, May 14, 2018, Beirut Pride was raided following the dissemination of a homophobic, sensational, fabricated programme that was attributed to Beirut Pride. The police arrested the organiser of Beirut Pride, and despite the interrogation proving the falsity of the accusations, the general prosecutor of Beirut ordered the suspension of the scheduled activities before initiating criminal proceedings against Hadi Damien for organizing events "that incite to debauchery".

Following the crackdown, Beirut Pride witnessed a surge in support with hundreds of people calling, sending messages and offering assistance. A media frenzy surrounded the event, and condemnations poured from international organisations, foreign governments, Lebanese parliamentarians, InterPride, and other prides such as Marseille Pride and Copenhagen Pride.

== Beirut Pride 2019 ==
The third edition was announced for September 28 - October 6, 2019. The year 2019 also marks the 50th commemoration of the Stonewall riots. The opening ceremony that was supposed to be held in Aresco center 3 "The Palace" in Al Hamra, got postponed after the member of the republic asked to stop the festival's activities accusing them of "violating moralities". It had already lost the support of the community after a trans woman came out about her negative experience with the founder and people questioned how the event was managed.

== Beirut Pride 2020 ==
The 2020 Beirut Pride event was held against the context of both the global COVID-19 pandemic and the devastation of much of Beirut by an explosion on 4 August. Beirut Pride offered a package of material related to arts, education, and mental support.

As most Pride events in the world were suspended due to COVID-19 restrictions, EPOA and InterPride organized Global Pride on June 27, a digital 27-consecutive-hour event streamed on YouTube and on several online channels. Beirut Pride secured contributions from Afghanistan, Armenia, Azerbaijan, Iran, Iraq, and Syria, in addition to the participation of other countries from the Middle East and the Arab World such as Egypt, Libya, Morocco, Palestine, Sudan, Tunisia, and groups from the Arab diaspora. Arabic-speaking participants also suggested Arabic terms that are equivalent to “Pride”, and voted on them, eventually choosing إفتخار (iftikhār).

Beirut Pride contributed two videos to the Global Pride event. One produced by media platform Megaphone, released on the International Day Against Homophobia, Transphobia and Biphobia 2020, and offering an expansive overview on LGBTIQ+ realities in Lebanon; and a second, soothing, video "We Learn from Lebanon" depicting the movement of Mediterranean sea waves with a message of stability and steadfastness, produced by Beirut Pride just a few weeks before the Beirut explosion.

== Beirut Pride Initiatives ==
For Beirut Pride to sustainably grow, organizers went beyond Pride Days and started working on some LGBTIQ+ files. Beirut Pride opened channels of communication with all religious authorities and political parties. It lobbied during the Parliamentary elections of May 2018 for the decriminalization of homosexuality, which the Christian democratic Kataeb Party and some independent candidates endorsed from the civil society and from the traditional parties. Contributing to the fight against homophobia, Beirut Pride collaborated with the American University of Beirut and with the Lebanese American University. It maintained its media presence, and worked with journalists and reporters on several LGBTIQ+ coverage. Beirut Pride facilitated several photoshoots in Lebanon on LGBTIQ+ themes, and initiated the Arabic script #TypeWithPride based on the Gilbert Color Bold typeface, currently in development with designer Ghiya Haidar and Fontself. Through a regular presence on the international scene, participating to local and global talks, conferences and panels, expanding philanthropy and assistance, Beirut Pride constantly builds its reputation which positions it in the LGBTIQ+ global narrative.

=== HIV/AIDS ===
For World AIDS Day, Beirut Pride launched a three-day event focusing on HIV and sexually transmitted infections. Organizers got the rights to adapt the UNAIDS World AIDS Day campaign of 2017, and renewed this collaboration in 2018. Beirut Pride also issued the trilingual HIV Multi-Sectorial Framework in Lebanon, before revisiting and augmenting a parliament bill that frames the rights of people living with HIV, emphasizes on national prevention outreach and criminalises discrimination against people with HIV.

== See also ==
- Pride parade
- LGBT rights in Lebanon
- Human rights in Lebanon
- LGBT in the Middle East
- List of LGBT events
- List of LGBT awareness days
