= Bedayaa =

LGBTQ+ organisation serving Egypt and Sudan

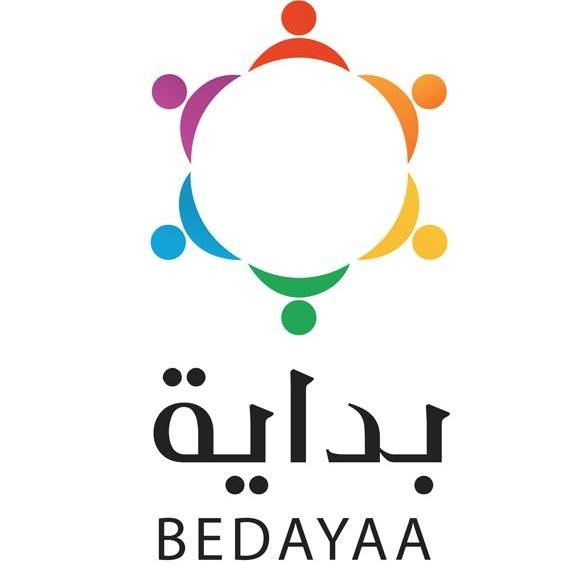
- Founded: July 2010
- Founders: Noor Sultan, Azza Sultan
- Type: LGBTQ+ organization
- Headquarters: Cairo, Egypt
- Region served: Nile valley (Egypt and Sudan)
- Official language: Arabic
- Executive Director: Noor Sultan
- Website: bedayaa.org

Bedayaa is an LGBTQ+ organization founded in 2010 that operates in the Nile valley region of Egypt and Sudan. Bedayaa promotes LGBTQ+ advocacy and provides variety of services. Some of the organization's services include emotional and psychological support, legal advice, workshops, and HIV testing. Their website has been repeatedly taken down by attacks and Sudanese law towards nongovernmental organizations has been obstructive.

== Founding ==
Bedayaa was founded in July 2010 by Azza Sultan and Noor Sultan. The organization formed from volunteers recognizing common issues faced by the LGBTQ+ community in Egypt and Sudan including cultural perception, criminalization, and religious prohibition.

== Activities ==
Bedayaa works to serve as a safe space for Egyptian and Sudanese LGBTQ+ people. They provide emotional and psychological support as well as LGBTQ resources in Arabic. The organization also provides outreach and educational services, and legal advice. They hold LGBTQ+ workshops. Bedayaa connects people and organizations together a local, regional, and international level to facilitate assistance abd information sharing. Bedayaa frequently communicates with other LGBTQ+ organizations including Meem and Helem in Lebanon, AlQaws and Aswat in Palestine, Kif-Kif in Morocco, Abu Nawas in Algeria, and Freedom Sudan.

Bedayaa provides HIV testing. The organization also released an informational video about HIV in 2018. The video "It's Not the End of the World" discusses misconceptions about HIV from the perspective of a recently diagnosed person.

The organization aims to create a more tolerant society in Egypt and Sudan by advocating for the abolishment of all laws criminalize homosexuality. This includes laws that target queer people indirectly, such as Egypt's debauchery law which has been used to prosecute and imprison LGBTQ+ people. The organization has used a private Facebook group of 500 members whom the administrators personally know to inform each other about arrests of LGBTQ+ people, warn each other about police, and raise money if someone cannot afford a lawyer. Since 2017, Bedayaa has documented cases of the debauchery law being used against LGBTQ+ people. The organization has legally represented 111 of those arrested in a single year.

The organization creates research and sends reports. They performed a survey in 2012 investigating violence against gay people. In 2018, Bedayaa sent documents prepared by The AIDS Effects and Dangers Awareness Society to the Immigration and Refugee Board of Canada as part of a response to information report. They made the "Needs Assessment Report" of Sudan's queer community in 2020. In 2021, Bedayaa along with two other queer organizations in the region (Mesahat for Sexual and Gender Diversity and Shades of Ebony) published a booklet of stories from the LGBTQI+ community about the discrimination and gender based violence they experience. Bedayaa is a member of the International Lesbian and Gay Association (IGLA), and some of their Sudanese members attend IGLA events.

== Challenges ==
Both the Egyptian and Sudanese government are strict on the expression of LGBTQ+ issues. Bedayaa's website has been repeatedly brought down by attacks. According to executive director Noor Sultan, "Sometimes the website wasn't there. We're not sure if it's a technical problem or if it's the government trying to stop us." Bedayaa uses a Cloudfare program called Project Galileo to help protect its website from attacks.

Bedayaa and other queer organizations unable to legally register as non-governmental organizations (NGOs) in Sudan. This is why their Facebook only lists their headquarters in Cairo, Egypt. Being unable to register as an NGO prevents the organizations from creating bank accounts or receiving international funding. Sudanese queer organizations are unable to have offices within the country. Embassies may allow events to be organized and may offer cash donations alongside international NGOs to work around legal barriers; however, they may pressure organizations to make themselves more publicly visible, such as displaying pride flags.
