= Missak Terzian =

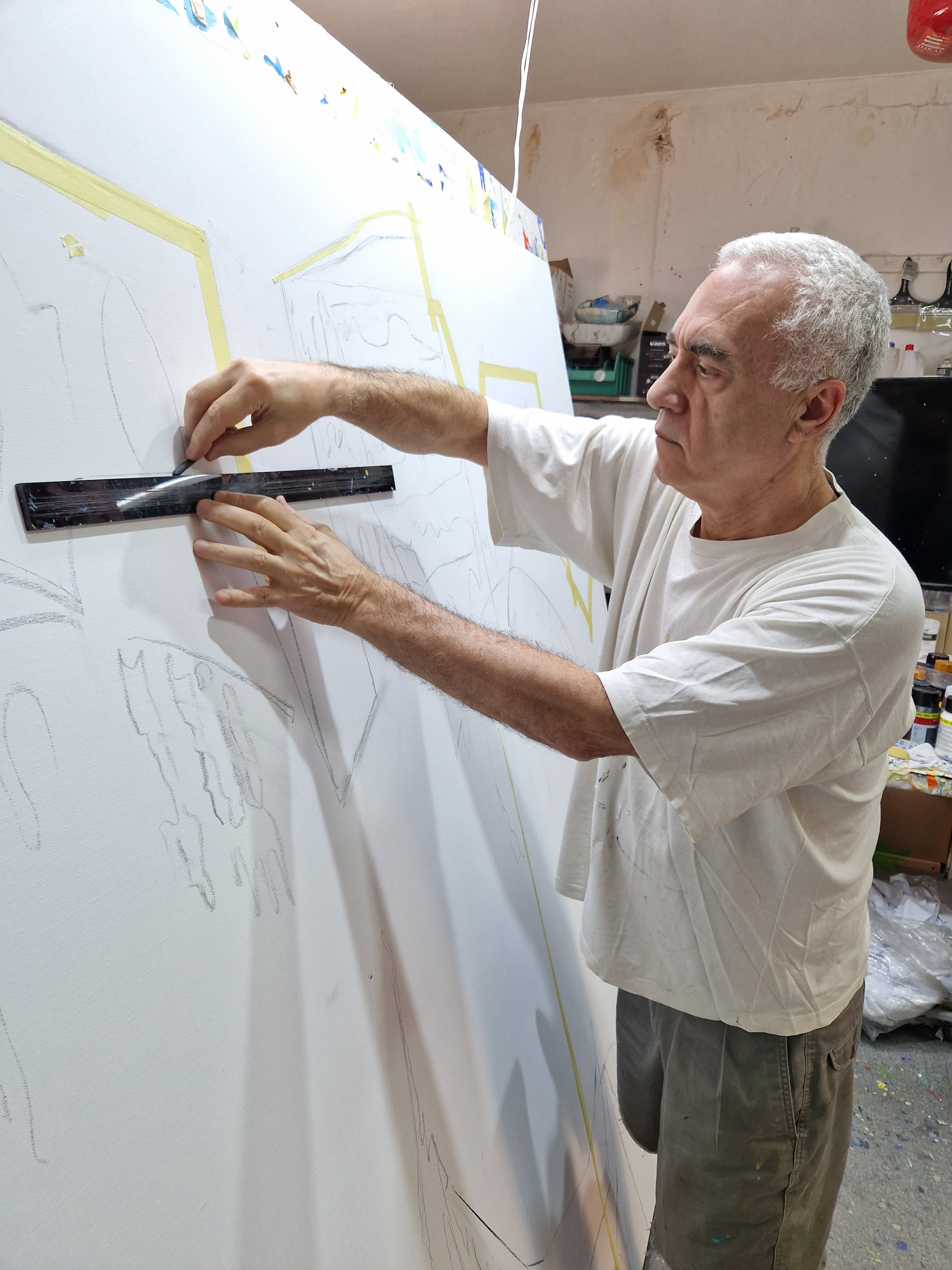
- Missak Terzian in his studio 2024
- Born: May 9, 1949 (age 77); Mar Mikhaël, Lebanon
- Education: Ecole d’Art Guvder, London College of Printing, London
- Website: missakterzian.com

Missak Terzian (born 1949) is a Lebanese-American artist of Armenian descent, known for his work in Semi-Abstract Figurative Expressionism and Geometric Abstraction. Throughout his career, he has explored themes such as love, sexuality, motherhood, and later, geometric forms and regional iconography. He has exhibited his work internationally and remains a notable figure in both Lebanese and Armenian cultural circles.

== Early life and education ==
Missak Terzian was born in Mar Mikhael, Beirut, Lebanon, in 1949 to an Armenian family. His interest in art began at 9 years old when a family friend, Claude, gave him his first painting kit. This early experience sparked his lifelong passion for painting.

In 1967, Terzian participated in his first group exhibition at 18 while attending the Guvder Art School in Beirut, from which he graduated the following year. He furthered his education in 1971 at the London College of Printing, earning a degree in printing techniques. Upon completing his studies, he returned to Beirut and joined his family’s printing business, working as a color corrector.

== Early artistic career (1960s-1980s) ==
Despite his professional commitments in the printing industry, Terzian continued to nurture his artistic pursuits. From the late 1960s until the mid-1980s, he participated in annual group exhibitions. His early works largely focused on themes of love, nudity, sexuality, and motherhood. During this time, Terzian developed his distinct Semi-Abstract Figurative Expressionism style, characterized by the abstract depiction of recognizable figures. His work was also influenced by Expressionism, with figures distorted to convey emotional and psychological states.

A significant influence on Terzian's early style was Armenian-Lebanese painter Paul Guiragossian, known for his focus on the human body. This influence is evident in Terzian's exploration of the human form and emotional expression through abstraction.

== Solo exhibitions and expanded subject matter ==
By 1984, Terzian had gained enough recognition to begin holding solo exhibitions. While his painting style remained largely the same, his subject matter began to expand, including representations of his domestic life, such as his pet cats, dogs, and birds. Among his pets are three birds: a parrot named Picasso and two love birds named Manet and Monet.

In 1989, Terzian moved with his family to Los Angeles, California, to escape the instability of Lebanon during the Lebanese Civil War. Despite relocating, he maintained strong ties with his homeland and frequently returned to Beirut. His new environment influenced his artwork, and music themes became recurrent in his pieces, as seen in works like The Guitar (1994).

== Career and artistic shifts ==
In the early 2000s, Terzian became a prominent figure in the Lebanese art scene. He was invited to join the committee of the Hamazkayin Art Gallery in Lebanon, an institution dedicated to promoting Lebanese-Armenian culture. In 2016, Terzian retired from the family printing business after four decades of involvement, dedicating himself entirely to his art.

In 2017, Terzian began transitioning into a new artistic phase, characterized by Geometric Abstraction. This style focuses on abstract shapes that do not directly reference real-world objects. Despite this shift, Terzian continued to create works in his earlier Semi-Abstract Figurative Expressionist style, such as Echo (2019), which remains part of the Ramzi and Saeda Dalloul Art Foundation collection. Echo features two abstractly rendered women, depicted with exaggerated forms and vibrant colors, reflecting his earlier artistic influences.

== Geometric abstraction and latest works ==
During the late 2010s, Terzian's focus on Geometric Abstraction became more prominent. He explored pure abstract forms, as well as stylized depictions of landscapes and cityscapes. Inspired by visits to locations such as Bryce Canyon National Park in Utah and Faraya in Lebanon, Terzian incorporated monochromatic shapes to evoke a sense of vastness and uniformity in the natural world. His work during this period also featured elements of Arab and Lebanese iconography, including palm trees, the columns of Baalbek, and olive trees.

The Blooming Olive Tree (2021), part of the Ramzi and Saeda Dalloul Art Foundation collection, exemplifies this later period, featuring a vibrant palette and bold geometric forms. The olive tree, a symbol of Mediterranean nationhood, became a recurring motif in Terzian's work during this time.

== Artistic process and materials ==
Throughout his career, Terzian has employed a variety of materials and techniques. In his early period of Semi-Abstract Figurative Expressionism, he primarily used oil on canvas, occasionally incorporating tapestry wool to pay homage to artists like Pablo Picasso. In his later Geometric Abstraction period, Terzian shifted to using acrylics, although he occasionally returned to oil for specific works, such as Earth Rise (2021).

Terzian’s artistic process often begins with premeditated sketches, either in notebooks or on digital devices, carefully planning his compositions before translating them onto canvas.

== Personal life ==
Missak Terzian divides his time between Los Angeles and Lebanon. In addition to his ongoing work as a painter, he enjoys spending time with his grandchildren, whom he describes as a central joy in his life.
