= Sandra Melhem =

Lebanese LGBT activist

- Years active: 2015–present
- Organizations: Ego Beirut; Queer Relief Fund
- Known for: LGBT rights activism

Sandra Melhem (Arabic: ساندرا ملحم) is a Lebanese entrepreneur and LGBT rights activist. She is the owner of Projekt / Ego Beirut club, a popular LGBT-friendly venue. Melhem founded Queer Relief Fund, a humanitarian charity, in the aftermath of the 2020 Beirut explosion. She received a special mention award for her humanitarian engagement at the International Prize for LGBT rights ceremony held in 2021 in Paris.

== Work and activism ==
In 2015, Melhem founded Projekt / Ego Beirut club north of the Lebanese capital with four LGBT friends. Neither Melhem nor any of the other founding members had any experience in club management. She was encouraged however by increased openness towards LGBT people in Lebanon, and the need for a safe meeting space for the local and regional LGBT community. The club quickly became one of the most popular LGBT party hotspots.

Melhem advocates for LGBT equality and inclusion, particularly for transgender individuals. She showcases gay artists at her venues and events to raise public awareness and break societal misconceptions and stereotypes surrounding LGBT individuals and culture. Melhem was an early supporter of the Lebanese drag community. She arranged —with Lebanon's pioneering drag queens Evita Kedavra and Anya Kneez— and hosted Beirut's first drag show in 2015. According to Melhem, supporting drag artists and organizing drag shows are a form of protest against societal norms, and an invitation to the public to explore queer art and entertainment. Melhem is credited with contributing to the growth of the drag movement in Beirut; she hosts the Beirut Grand Ball, the biggest annual drag event in Lebanon. Melhem's Projekt/ EGO Beirut club, considered the foremost among Beirut's gay safe spaces, paved the way for the local drag scene to grow, and for a wider appreciation of queer art. Melhem is also active in initiatives that address disparities in access to healthcare resources and mental health management for LGBT residents of Lebanon.

Sandra founded 'Queer Relief Fund', a humanitarian charity offering financial assistance to marginalized queer individuals affected by the 2020 Beirut explosion. The blast was particularly damaging to the gay-friendly neighborhood of Mar Mikhael, where beneficiaries were assisted with medical fees, home repair and relocation costs, and AIDS medical management.

== Recognition ==
In 2021, Melhem was given the Leader in LGBT Health Equity Award by the Lebanese Medical Association for Sexual Health (LebMASH). On IDAHOT 2021, Melhem received a special mention award for her humanitarian engagement at the International Prize for LGBT rights ceremony held by the City of Paris.

== Personal life ==
Melhem is openly gay. In a 2018 interview, Melhem spoke about her coming out experience, describing it as “well accepted”.
