= Dayna Ash =

Poet and cultural activist from Lebanon

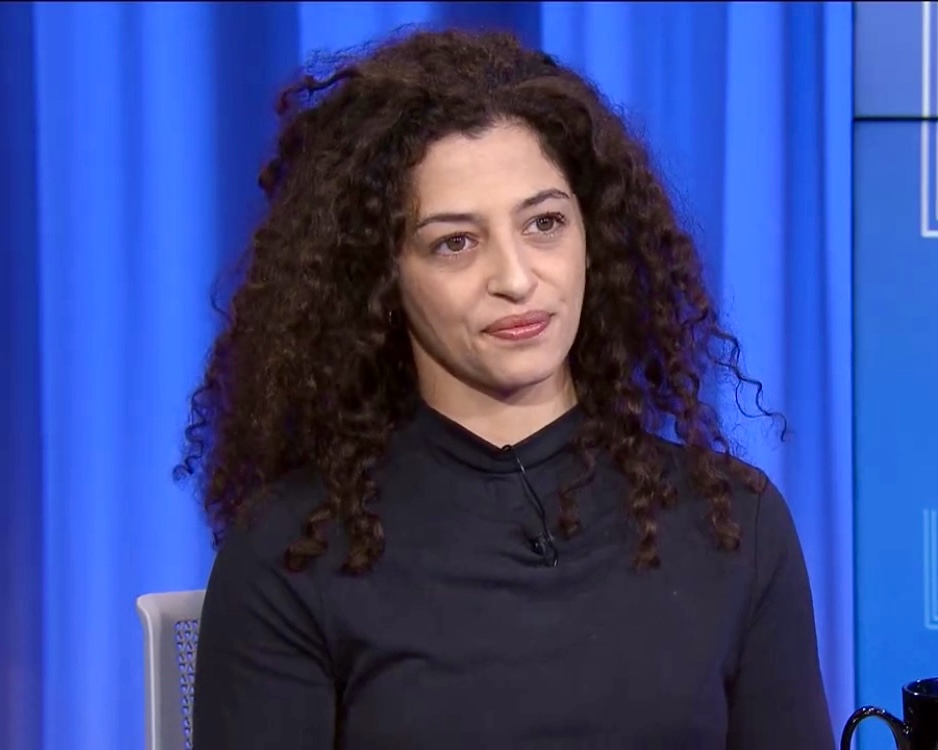
Ash in 2020

Dayna Ash (Arabic: داينا آش) is a Lebanese cultural and social activist, feminist, playwright, performance poet, and the Founder & Executive Director of the non-profit arts organization, Haven for Artists based in Beirut, Lebanon. She was named one of the BBC's 100 Women for 2019, and received the 2020 Woman of Distinction award from NGO Committee on the Status of Women, New York NGO/CSW/NY.

Ash was born in Lebanon but raised in the United States. She lived in California for sixteen years before moving to Beirut.

== Poetry ==
Ash began her career in the arts as a spoken word poet. In a response to one of Ash's spoken word pieces, Carolin Dylla described her as "the very real, unpretentious, tattooed incarnation of art’s most genuine capacities: to create beauty from anger and despair, and to explore ways to create meaning where rational explanation fails." Her poem "Lullaby" was published online in Riwayya: A Space of Collision in 2015.

== Haven for Artists ==
Ash founded Haven For Artists in 2010. She currently serves as its executive director. Haven For Artists is a non-profit in the Mar Mikhaël neighborhood of Beirut, which provides space for underground artists. It received official status as a non-governmental organization in 2017.

Haven's original goal was to organize events that brought artists together for shared performances, to reduce competition for exposure. In 2016, Haven acquired a house in the Mar Mikhaël neighborhood to provide a more permanent space for performances, and to create a living and working space for artists.

As of 2016, Haven for Artists has produced annual exhibitions with international, regional, and local artists; held regular workshops on many artistic mediums, renovated two heritage houses in Beirut which acted as a safe space and shelter. HFA extended its network, skills, and tools to work on numerous campaigns for human rights while providing a platform and network for talented creatives. Havens' work merges art and activism through workshops, public discussions, and events.

In 2017, Haven was the temporary home of the English-language bookstore Aaliyah's Books. As of 2018, Haven provided four three-month artist residencies at a time. The ground floor of the building hosts Concept 2092, which includes a cafe, co-working space, art exhibitions, and a concept store selling residents' work. Acting as a safe and all-inclusive free space.

In 2019, Ash and Haven were featured in Lebanese filmmaker Tania Safi's video series Shway Shway (meaning "Little by Little"), which highlights local activists.

== Other activism ==
Ash currently hosts panels, talks, and workshops oriented around art for social change.

In 2014, Ash worked as a senior field officer for the NGO ACTED, supporting Syrian refugees.

In October 2019, Ash participated in anti-government protests in Beirut. The newspaper The National identified her as one of the leaders of "the frontline women" at protests that brought together women from many cultural backgrounds to advocate for their concerns as women.
