= Georges Azzi =

Lebanese activist

- Born: 1979 (age 46–47)
- Organization(s): Arab Foundation for Freedoms and Equality

Georges Azzi (Arabic: جورج قزي; born 1979) is the co-founder of Helem, a Lebanese non-profit organisation working on improving the legal and social status of LGBTQ people, and is the executive director of the Arab Foundation for Freedoms and Equality.

== Early life and education ==
Azzi grew up in Beirut, Lebanon, in a conservative Christian family, during a civil war which divided Beirut between the East (the predominantly Christian side) and the West (the predominantly Muslim side). He moved to Paris in 2000, where he earned a degree in engineering, multimedia, and communications and became involved in LGBTQ activism. As a gay man who had grown up in Lebanon, he wanted to set up a centre in Beirut similar to Paris's LGBTQ Centre, to give LGBTQ people opportunities he had lacked. He co-founded Helem (which means "dream" in Arabic) in 2004.

== Career ==
Azzi is the first openly gay activist in the MENA region and has been described as "a prominent activist for lesbian, gay, bisexual and transgender rights" by the Lebanese Daily Star. On 14 May 2018, Azzi won OutRight Action International's Felipa de Souza Award for his work with The Arab Foundation for Freedoms and Equality.

Georges Azzi is a veteran Lebanese sexual rights and gender activist in the MENA. He co-founded the first LGBTIQ+ organization in Lebanon in 2004 (Helem), co-founded the first sexual health clinic Marsa in 2011, and founded the first regional sexual rights organization in 2009 – the Arab Foundation for Freedoms and Equality (AFE) that aims to defend and raise the voices of LGBTIQ+ people in the MENA region. Under his leadership, AFE became the largest and only regional LGBTIQ+ organization in the MENA that promotes for sexual rights and challenges discrimination.

Being the first gay man in the region to publicly talk about his sexual orientation on live television on a Lebanese local channel. When the Lebanese civil society was refusing to work with Helem when it was first launched, Azzi advocated and succeeded in enforcing the LGBTIQ+ agenda in Lebanon within different organizations and parties. Under his leadership, the first International Day Against Homophobia and Transphobia (IDAHOT) was celebrated in Lebanon in 2005bringing an unquestionable visibility to the LGBTIQ+ community; the first LGBTIQ+ publication – Barra (Out) Magazine – was created; the first awareness brochure highlighting sexual practices for Men having sex with Men and HIV was distributed in Lebanon with the approval of the Ministry of Health, which was a huge step towards the public discussion of sexual rights and discrimination against People Living with HIV under the patronage of an official authority. Working with official and legal authorities was extended to creating the first model plea for lawyers for defending LGBTIQ+ individuals before Lebanese courts. In addition, throughout his advocacy efforts, Azzi initiated the work of mainstreaming Sexual Orientation Gender Identity and Expression (SOGIE) issues in organizations working with refugees such as IOM.

Azzi's work has not been without its challenges. As an openly gay activist in the MENA region, he has faced harassment, threats, and attacks from those who oppose his activism. In 2019, during the October Revolution in Lebanon, he was targeted by pro-government protesters and received daily harassment and defamatory messages, as well as threats of physical harm and death. AFE that was forcibly shut down by Lebanese General Security in 2018.

In recognition of his advocacy work, Azzi has received numerous awards and honors. In 2014, he was awarded the Felipa de Souza award from the International Gay and Lesbian Human Rights Commission, and in 2019 celebration of courage

Today, Azzi continues to be a vocal advocate for LGBT rights in the MENA region and around the world. He has spoken at numerous conferences and events and is regularly quoted in the media on LGBT issues. Despite the challenges he has faced, he remains committed to his vision of a world in which all individuals, regardless of their sexual orientation or gender identity, are able to live free from discrimination and oppression.
