= Gilbert (typeface) =

Typeface

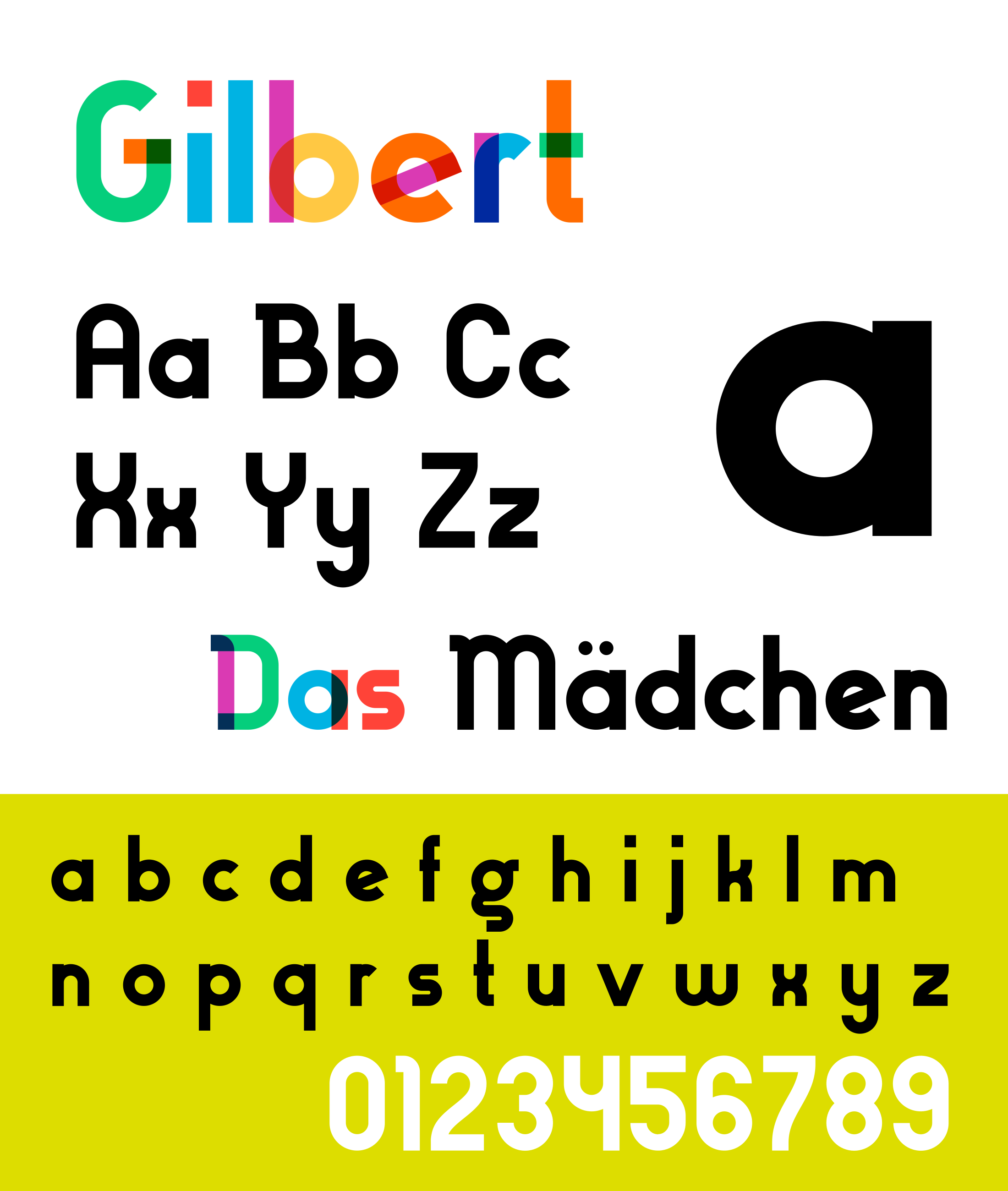
- Category: Sans-serif
- Designers: Robyn Makinson; Kazunori Shiina; Hayato Yamasaki
- Foundry: Fontself
- Date released: 2017
- License: SIL Open Font License
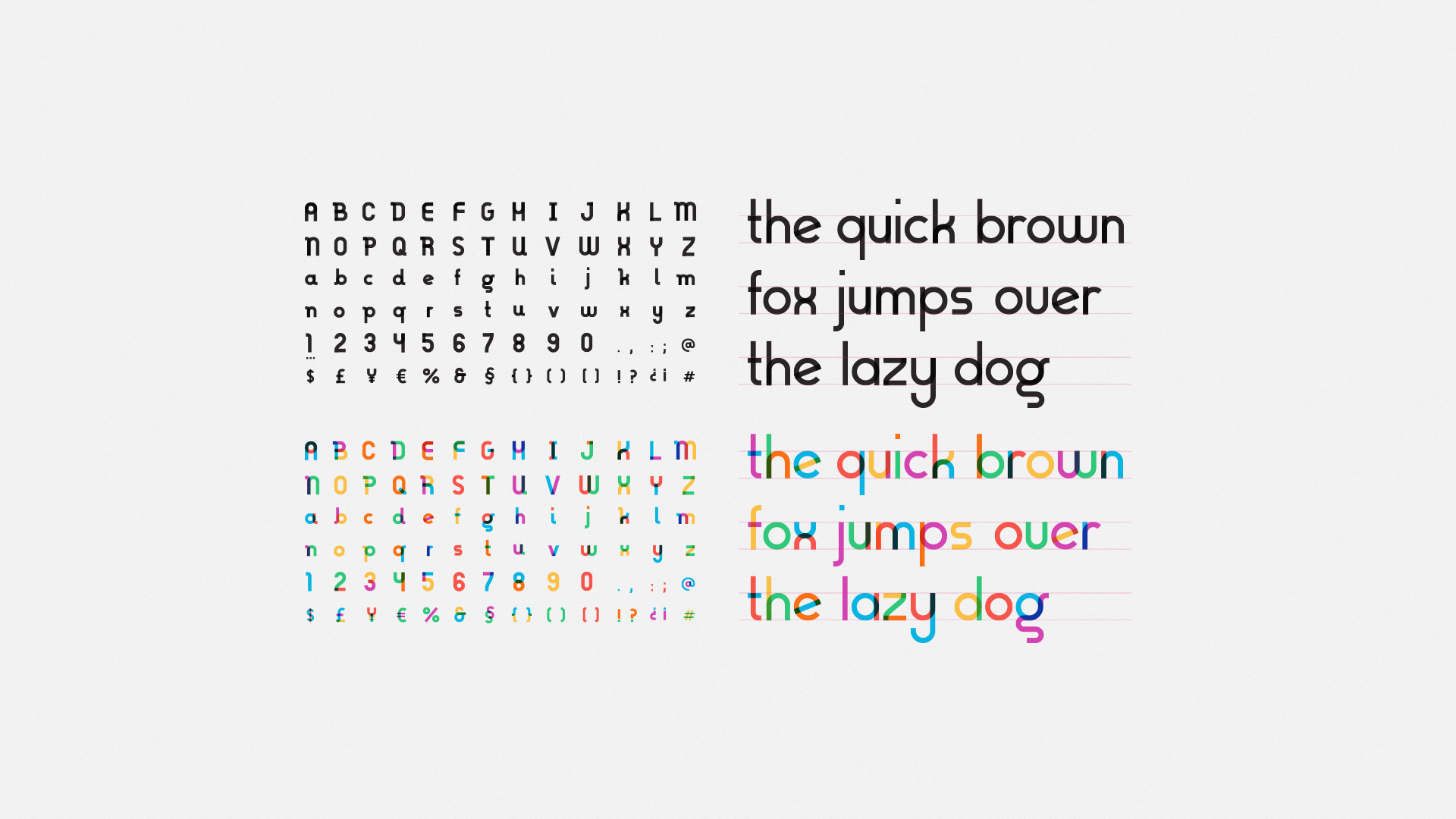
- Sample
- Latest release version: 1.005

Gilbert is sans-serif typeface, a tribute font to honor the memory of Gilbert Baker, the creator of the LGBT Rainbow Flag. This colorful typeface was supposedly designed to "express diversity and inclusion", specially made for striking headlines and statements that could live on banners for rallies and protests. It is part of the TypeWithPride initiative, a collaboration between NewFest, NYC Pride, Ogilvy and Fontself.

This font has 2 versions, namely Color Bold and Bold. The Color Bold version was made in colors with OpenType SVG. The font has been included in Adobe Fonts since 2019 under the SIL Open Font License (OFL) license. An animated version was made by Animography.

In May 2017 a contest was organized to invite creatives to design their own banners, posters, videos and signs to celebrate diversity & creativity. Many creatives joined and submitted their work and grand prize winners got their creations showcased at Times Square's giant screens.

== Awards ==
- Webby for Good 2018.
- The One Show 2018 Silver in Typography
- Clio 2018 Bronze in Brand Design
- D&AD Yellow Pencil 2018 in Campaign Branding & Identity
- Caples 2018
- Cannes Lions 2017 Silver in Typography and Bronze in Typography

== Gallery ==
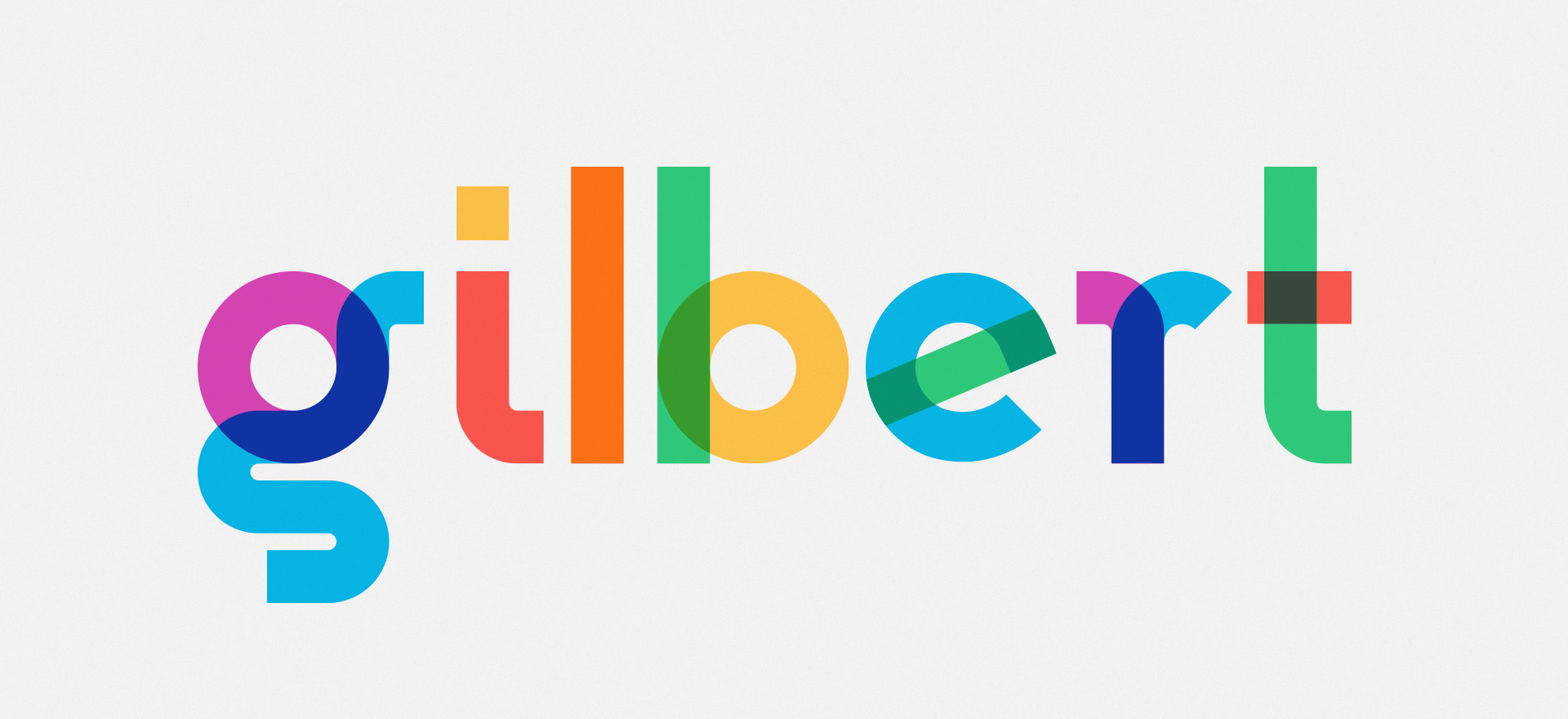
"gilbert" in Gilbert Color Bold

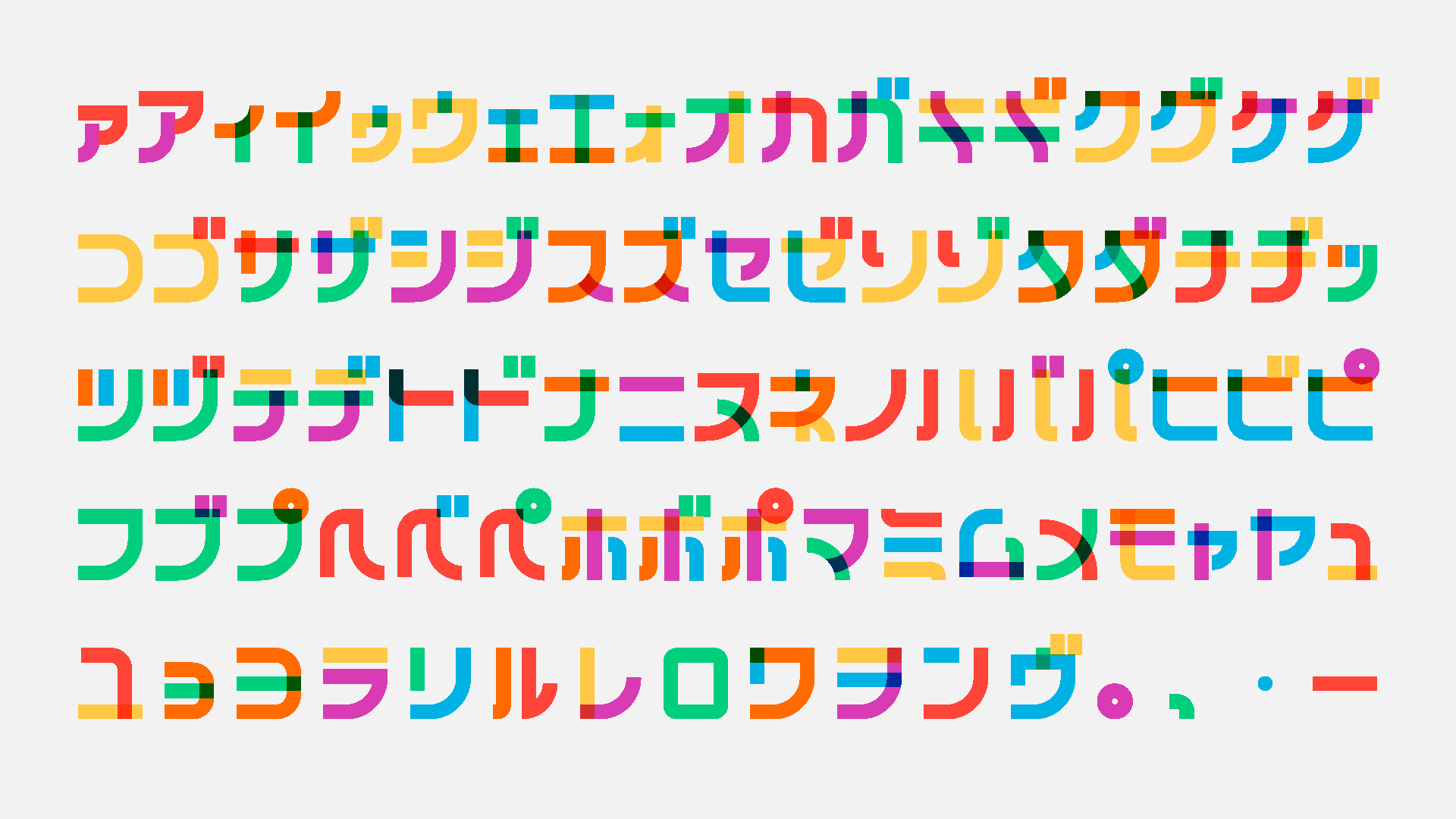
Katakana, Japanese characters

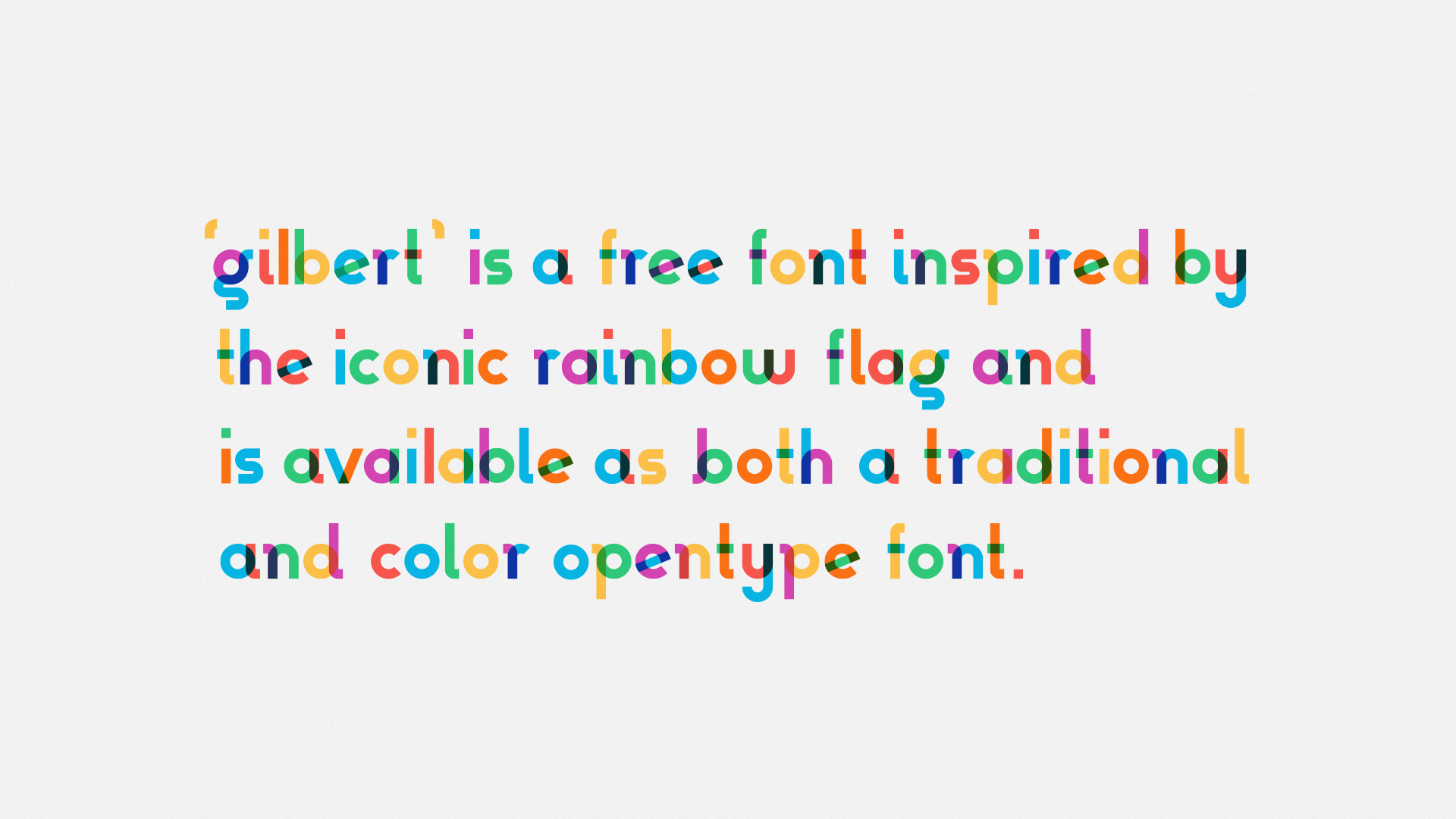

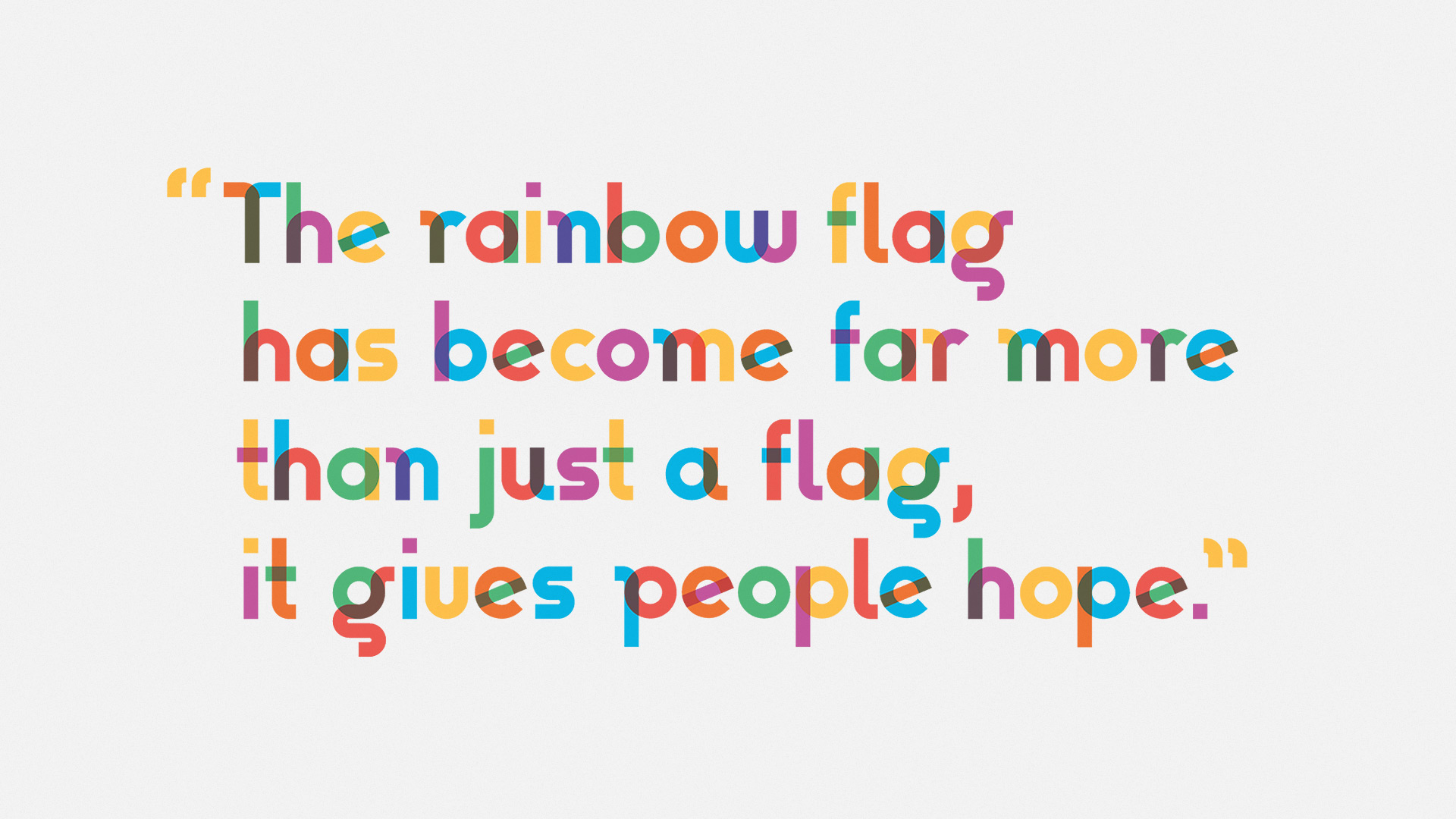
