= Meem (group) =

Lebanese LGBTI organization

Meem (in Arabic م) was a Lebanese LBTQ women's group, founded in August 2007 and disbanding in 2014. At its height, the organization had 400 members.

The full name is مجموعة مؤازرة للمرأة المثليّة, pronounced /Majmou3at Mou'azara lil Mar’a al-Mithliya/ (translated as Support Group for Lesbian Women). The name "Meem" is derived from the Arabic letter م. The letter "meem" as an initial for the word lesbian (in Arabic مثليّة pronounced /mithliya/) also symbolizes the anonymity of lesbians in the Arab world.

Meem was partially formed through mutual inspiration via the Lebanese LGBT organization Helem, though with focus on a comparatively less visible political strategy and a flatter organizational structure than Helem.

== Aims ==
The group offers community support, psychological counseling, an activity center, legal support, social events, and the opportunity to work on social change. Meem hosted a Womyn House that served as an activity and resource center in Beirut.

The group was critical of homonormativity and rainbow capitalism.

== Publications ==
In 2009, Meem published "Bareed Mista3jil." Available in both English and Arabic versions, the book is a collection of 41 true and personal stories from lesbians, bisexuals, queer and questioning women, and transgender persons from all over Lebanon.

Meem published a weekly online magazine titled Bekhsoos with anonymous contributors speaking to MENA feminist queer discourse and translating English terms into Arabic usage.

== See also ==
- Helem
- LGBT rights in Lebanon
- List of LGBT rights organisations
