= Mousbah Baalbaki =

Lebanese dancer

Mousbah Baalbaki is a contemporary male belly dancer from Lebanon.

The New York Times described Baalbaki as "sinuous and seductive...in a gauzy black caftan over Bedouin-style white robe, [as] he undulated on stage with a faraway look in his eyes and a bodyguard close at hand". The New York Times article was criticised by Stavros Karayanni for an Orientalist "sadly anticipated tone that ranges between sardonic and superior—an efficient and popular technique for relating information about something titillating, enticing and 'different'".

Baalbaki has said that he wishes to break societal taboos: "Here we grow up thinking men shouldn't dance Arabic."

== Biography and family ==
Baalbaki was raised in a conservative Sunni Muslim household in Sidon. He attended the Lebanese American University. Baalbaki is gay, and identifies as male: "I'm trying to prove that a man can do it, can dance in this society."
