= Helem =

LGBTQIA+ rights NGO in Lebanon

- حلم
- Founded: 2001; 25 years ago
- Legal status: Non-governmental organization
- Purpose: LGBT rights in Lebanon, LGBT activism
- Location: Beirut, Lebanon
- Region served: Lebanon, MENA
- Award: Felipa de Souza Award
- Website: helem.net

Helem (Arabic: حلم, Lebanese Arabic pronunciation: [ħelem]; which means ‘dream’) is the first LGBTQIA+ rights non-governmental organization in the Arab world, founded in Beirut, Lebanon, in 2001. Its mission is to lead a non-violent struggle for the liberation of lesbian, gay, bisexual, transgender, queer, intersex, and other persons with non-conforming sexualities and/or gender identities (LGBTQIA+) in Lebanon and the MENA region from all sorts of violations of their individual and collective civil, political, economic, social, and cultural rights. Helem's name was also an acronym in Arabic that stood for “Lebanese protection for the LGBT community” (Arabic: حماية لبنانية للمثليين/ات والمزدوجين/ات المغايرين/ات, or حلم.م.م.م.م.م). Officially founded in October 2004 when it sent its documents to the ministry of interior and was led by George Azzi then Ghassan Makarem then Charbel Mayda then Samira Trad then Genwa Samhat then Tarek Zeidan.

== Organization ==
Helem runs various programs and advocacy campaigns and provides a wide range of services to members of the LGBTQIA+ community in Lebanon, including emergency response, case management, legal assistance, social support, family support, and mental health support. It also runs the largest non-commercial queer space in the MENA region through its community center and prioritizes decriminalization, labor rights, housing, hate speech, and economic empowerment as advocacy priorities. Its current executive director is Tarek Zeidan.

== History ==
=== 1998-2003 ===
Prior to Helem's inception in 2001, a group of gay and lesbian activists created “Gay Lebanon”, a chat page on YAHOO! Chats to set up social and personal meetings. Members of the chat group interested in more political action and mobilization created the underground group called Club Free whose main purpose was to create spaces for dialogue and debate on queer rights and challenges facing the community. Following many incidents of discrimination and violence against LGBTQ individuals in Lebanon and in other countries in the MENA region— including the infamous Egyptian Queen Boat raid in 2001 (also known as the case of the Cairo 52)—Club Free members decided to mobilize further and founded the very first organization in the Arab region dedicated to the rights of the LGBTQ community, calling it “Helem”.

In 2003, Helem activists staged a public boycott targeting the Beirut branches of Dunkin’ Donuts, stating that the international coffee chain had refused to serve “gay and gay-looking customers” and ask them to leave the premises. The boycott was significant as it was the first recorded incident of its kind to target a private institution in the MENA region and hold it accountable for homophobic and transphobic discrimination. The boycott received wide media attention in Lebanon.

Another milestone for the group was in February 2003, when Helem activists took part in the global protest against the American invasion of Iraq, raising the pride flag as part of the 10,000-person-strong protest in Beirut. The protest marked the first time on record that a rainbow flag was raised on Arab soil.

=== 2004-2006 ===
On September 24, 2004, Helem formally applied for registration as a non-governmental organization at the Lebanese Ministry of Interior and established its first public community center in the Hamra area of Beirut on Spears Street. The organization offered an emergency hotline for LGBTQ individuals in crisis, a queer-identified community space, and the first outreach and education programs promoting safe sex and information about HIV.

The public announcement of Helem's space prompted a backlash from political and religious figures in Lebanon, with one of Beirut municipality's council members openly calling on the government to release an injunction to thwart Helem's work, as it was alleged to be promoting perversion. Conservative Muslim clerics also accused the government of approving and authorizing “a gay rights group," claims that were then echoed by Lebanon's previous Interior Minister Ahmed Fatfat. As a result, Helem was illegally denied its formal registration papers by the Ministry of Interior, sparking a decades long legal fight for registration that continues as of July, 2021. While other subsequent gay rights groups were able to register as general “human rights” organizations, Helem has chosen to maintain its insistence on registering as a fully recognized LGBTQ-rights organization.

In 2004, members of the Lebanese queer diaspora established satellite organizations for Helem in Paris, France and Montreal, Canada. The Montreal group continues its work to this day as a locus for community support for all queers of Lebanese or MENA descent residing in Canada.

In 2005, Helem organized its first event in honor of the International Day Against Homophobia, Transphobia and Biphobia under the slogan “I Exist!”, sending a clear message to the Lebanese society of the group's intention to be visible, active, and political. It also published the first public LGBT magazine in the Arab region, “Barra” (Arabic for “Out”), which provided space for LGBTQ writers to challenge dominant media narratives on gender and sexuality.

Another prominent Helem publication of this era was "Homophobia: Views and Positions" (Arabic: رهاب المثلية: مواقف وشهادات) in 2006. This was one of Helem's first publications that tackled the subject of homophobia. With a preface written by renowned queer Lebanese author Rabih Alameddine, the book dove into scientific and political cases against homophobia and denounced their prevalence in Lebanese and Arab society.

=== 2007-2014 ===
In 2009, Helem organized its first public action, together with other human rights organizations, to oppose the governmental violence and oppression targeting minorities in Lebanon. The protest was in response to several incidents of violence by Lebanese citizens and police officers against gay men in Achrafieh, a neighborhood of Beirut. The protest was significant because it was the first public protest for LGBTQ rights in the region where demonstrators were visible and open about their identities and demands in front of the media and public.

In 2012, Helem organized another landmark protest and launched the “Abolish the Examinations of Shame” campaign, following the events of the Cinema Plaza crackdown (during which 36 men were arrested at a local cinema and subsequently coerced by police officers into undergoing anal probe tests to determine their sexual orientation). Helem held this protest in front of the Lebanese Ministry of Justice in Beirut, drawing larger crowds, under the slogan "Get Off Our Ass" (Arabic: “حلو عن طيزنا”) demanding immediate halt to the use of the anal examinations as part of investigations aimed to determining a person's sexual orientation. Helem was successful in halting rectal examinations by mobilizing and coordinating with the Lebanese Psychological Association, the Lebanese Psychiatric Society, and the Beirut Syndicate of Physicians to condemn these practices. The syndicate proceeded to ban their members from cooperating with law enforcement when asked to conduct future anal examinations—though this practice continues illegally in certain parts of the country in the absence of efficient oversight and accountability.

In 2013, Antoine Chakhtoura, the mayor of the Dekweneh municipality, a suburb of Beirut, ordered the shutdown of an LGBT-frequented night club, Ghost, after a violent raid by members of the police force where gay and trans* members of the community were illegally arrested and violated by municipal police forces. Helem staged another even larger protest in front of the Palace of Justice against the actions of the mayor, resulting in increased support for the release of the detainees. The incident became the inspiration for Lebanese band Mashrou' Leila’s song Tayf (Arabic: طيف) on their album Ibn El Leil.

In 2014, the Lebanese Internal Security Forces police raided the Agha Hammam (a Turkish bathhouse) in the Beirut neighborhood of Hamra after a person in custody alleged that the bathhouse was a meeting place for MSM (males who have sex with males) encounters. Helem protested the raid and, together with other organizations and allies, launched an investigation which revealed the arbitrary arrest and torture of 27 men who were present at the venue. A statement was issued thereafter in which Helem and other organizations denounced the incident as a violent act of homophobia and organized another public protest, this time in front of the infamous Hbeish police station, to release the detainees.

=== 2015-Present ===
In 2015, Helem restructured its mission and vision and expanded its work to include development and humanitarian aid, in addition to human rights advocacy. This included programs that specifically addressed the needs of the massive influx of LGBTQ refugees in Lebanon from Syria and other neighboring countries, as well as prioritization of social and economic rights such as labor, housing, education and healthcare along with decriminalization, hate speech, and civic engagement.

In 2019, Helem took part in the October 17 Lebanese Revolution (2019–2021 Lebanese protests) which witnessed an unprecedented level of queer visibility and leadership among the protesters, who mobilized to denounce and oppose rampant levels of government corruption and who called for economic and social reforms for all people in Lebanon. Helem erected a tent in the middle of revolution square under the banner “All of Us Means All of Us (Arabic: كلنا يعني كلنا ) to encourage queer people to take an active part in the protests, to provide a safe space for them to mobilize and organize, as well as to clearly state to protesters the inclusion and involvement of LGBTQ people in the revolution. The tent was destroyed along with the rest of the city by government-aligned vandals on October 29, 2020.

Following Lebanon's political unrest, Helem initiated relief efforts and initiatives in response to the economic collapse which was exacerbated by the advent of the COVID-19 pandemic in 2020. These relief efforts doubled after the devastating explosion of one of Port of Beirut’s warehouses on August 4, 2020—better known as Beirut explosion—which resulted in a death rate of up to 200 individuals and left 300,000 Beiruti inhabitants displaced, of whom many were members of the LGBTQIA+ community. Helem's community center was 600 meters away from the epicenter of the blast and suffered extreme damage as a result, though the organization did not suspend its services and activities throughout this period and continues to be a safe space and source of aid for the LGBTQ community in Lebanon.

== Studies and Publications ==
- Homophobia: Views and Positions, 2006
- A Book Not About Vegetation, or Bugs, or Cars, or Travel..., 2006
- I LOVE THEM, BUT..., 2009
- Souhaq, 2007
- Homosexuality and Bisexuality: myths and facts, 2009
- Only 534, 2009
- Homophobia in Clinical Services in Lebanon: A Physician Survey, 2009
- Homosexuality in the Law: A Case Study done in Arab Countries with a concentration on Lebanon and Tunisia, 2010

== Recognition and impact ==
Helem was the first officially-registered and publicly visible LGBT organization in the Middle East/North Africa region.

On January 23, 2009, the International Gay and Lesbian Human Rights Commission (IGLHRC) announced Helem as the winner of Felipa de Souza Award in honor of their work to improve LGBTI rights and the rights of those who face discrimination for their HIV status.

== See also ==
- Meem (group)
- LGBT rights in Lebanon
- List of LGBT rights organisations
