= Mar Mikhaël =

75th sector of Beirut

Coordinates: 33°53′58″N 35°31′29″E

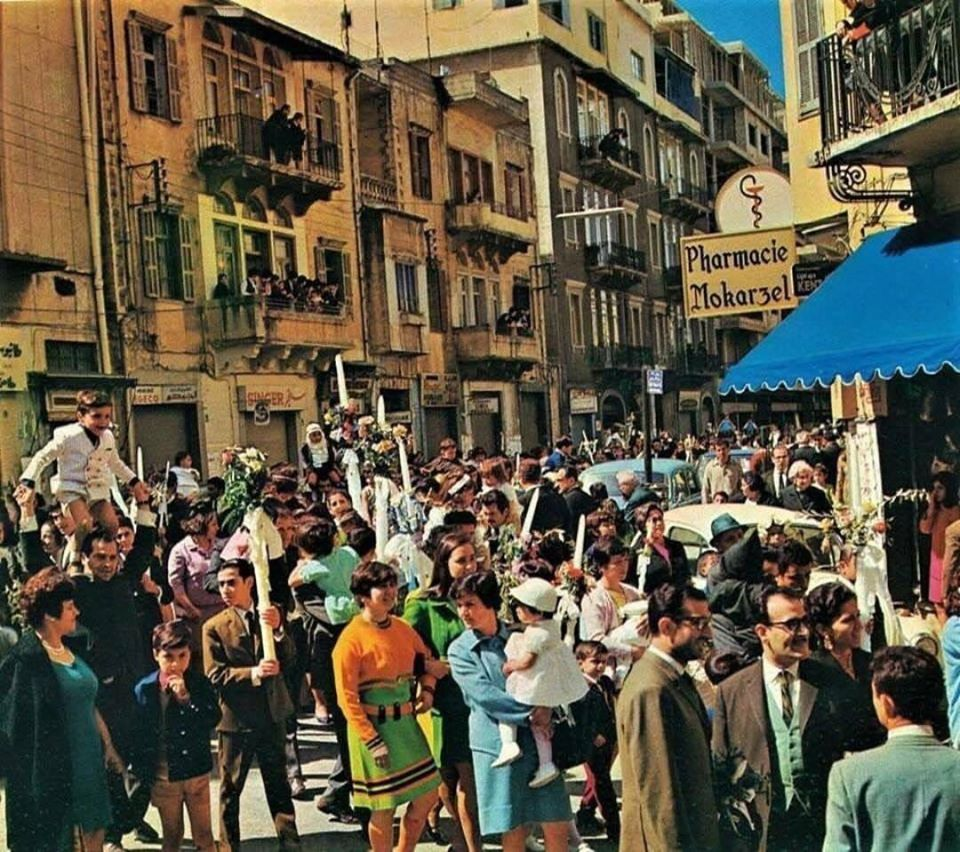
Mar Mikhael in 1966

Mar Mikhaël (Arabic: مار ميخائيل, Lebanese pronunciation: مار مخايل) is a residential and commercial neighborhood (sector 75) in the Medawar district of Beirut, Lebanon. It is a fashionable area with cafes, restaurants, art galleries, bakeries and shops. The neighborhood is named after the Maronite Catholic Church of St. Michael, which is located on Rue Pharoun.

== Location ==
The neighborhood lies north and south of Charles Helou, the maritime highway that separates the neighborhood from the Port of Beirut area, north of the Geitaoui neighborhood, east of Gemmayzeh, and west of the Pierre Gemayel Highway and the Beirut River. The neighborhood is considered a natural extension of the Gemmayzeh neighborhood, and its main thoroughfare Rue Arménie, is a continuation of Gemmayzeh's Rue Gouraud, the east-west axis that connects Beirut Central District to the eastern suburb of Bourj Hammoud.

== Development ==
After the rebuilding of Beirut Central District created and the emergence of Gemmayzeh and its Rue Gouraud as the hub of nightlife in Beirut, Mar Mikhaël was the natural next step in the gentrification of the neighborhoods adjacent to the Centre Ville. Since 2010, Mar Mikhaël has emerged as one of the most fashionable in Beirut, with many trendy boutiques, art galleries, antique furniture stores having opened in the area. In addition, many bars, restaurants and cafés have quickly replaced hardware shops, car parts and furniture stores, becoming a "hotspot for Beirut party-goers". By 2014, Mar Mikhaël had become a new hub for art and creativity, diminishing slightly in 2014–2015 with the re-emergence of Badaro, but remaining a popular destination in Beirut for dining and nightlife.
