= List of political families in Lebanon =

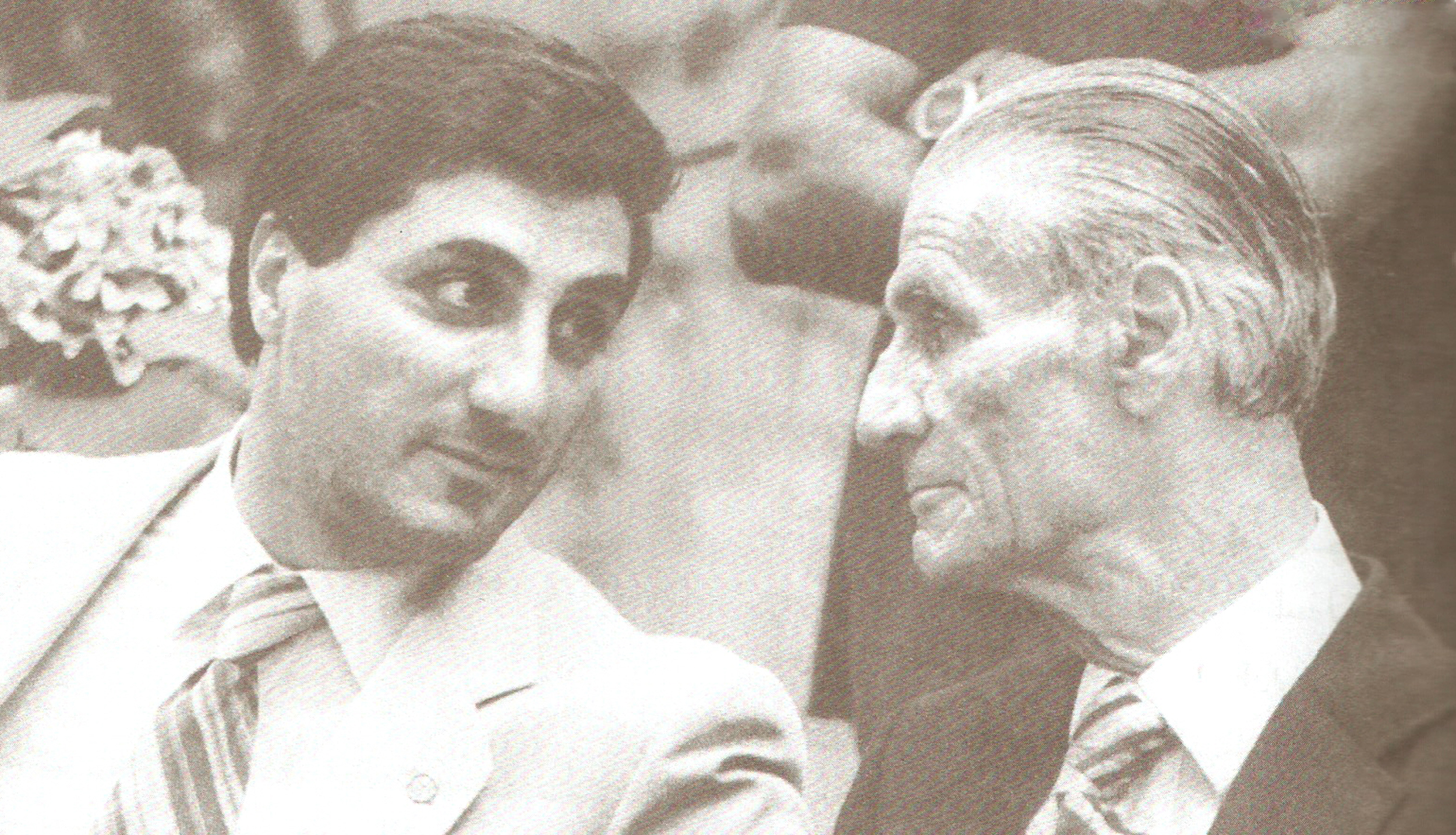
Bachir Gemayel (left) with his father Pierre Gemayel (right) who are the main figures of the Maronite Gemayel family.

This is a list of political families in Lebanon and their prominent members. This list does not include historical monarchies that ruled the region of the Levant but can include its modern-ruling decedents.

== Abou Fadel family ==
The Abou Fadel family is a prominent Greek Orthodox family originating in the village of Ain Aanoub. They are the descendance of Sheikh Jabbour Abou Fadel, governor of the Gharb al-Aqsa province of Mount Lebanon from 1771 to 1778, himself a descendant of Prince Abd al-Masih al-Qandil, affiliated with the Yemeni princes of the Qahtani family of Ghassan.

Notable members:

- Youssef Abou Fadel – member of the first administrative council of the Mount Lebanon Mutasarrifate; brother of Habib
- Habib Abou Fadel – judge and Kaymakam
  - Mounir Abou Fadel – Deputy Speaker of the Parliament; son of Habib
    - Marwan Abou Fadel – Co-founder of the Lebanese Democratic Party, son of Mounir

== Aoun family ==
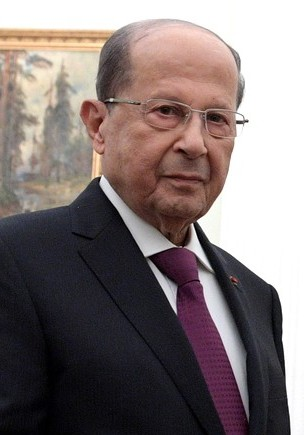
Michel Aoun, former president of the republic

The Aoun family is a Maronite family that was recently established as political via Michel Aoun's daughters. Aoun's second child, Claudine Aoun, married politician and former brigadier general, Chamel Roukoz. The third, Chantal, is married to Gebran Bassil, whom she met at an FPM conference in Paris in 1996. He served as a minister in different cabinets, and succeeded Aoun as president of the Free Patriotic Movement in 2015. Michel's nephew, Alain Aoun, is a Member of Parliament, elected in 2009, 2018 and 2022.

Notable members:

- Joseph Aoun – political personality
  - Alain Aoun – member of parliament; son of Joseph
- Michel Aoun – President, (2016-2022)
- Chamel Roukoz – politician and former brigadier general; former son-in-law of Michel
- Gebran Bassil – leader of the Free Patriotic Movement; son-in-law of Michel

== Arslan family ==
The Arslan family is a hereditary Druze leadership dynasty descends from the Lakhmids. The family name of Arslan was given to the descendants of the dynasty. The Arslan family was sent to the coast of the Lebanon by the Muslim Khalifa in 634 and they were responsible of guarding the coast and protecting it. They ruled Beirut for 476 years (from 634 until 1110).

Notable members:

- Toufic Arslan – Greater Lebanon politician; father of Majid
  - Emir Majid Arslan II – Lebanese independence hero and Druze leader; son of Toufic
    - Emir Faysal Arslan – son of Emir Majid and head of the House of Arslan from 1983 until 1989; son of Majid
    - Emir Talal Arslan – son of Emir Majid, Druze leader and current head of the House of Arslan; son of Majid
- Emir Shakib Arslan – influential Arab politician, writer, poet and historian; brother of Adil
- Prince Adil Arslan – Ottoman politician; brother of Shakib

== El Assaad family ==
El-Assaad or Al As'ad is a feudal political clan originally from Najd and a main branch of the anza tribe. Unrelated to Syrian or Palestinian Al-Assads, El-Assaad dynasty that ruled most of South Lebanon for three centuries and whose lineage defended fellow denizens of history'sJabal Amel (Mount Amel) principality – today southern Lebanon – for 36 generations, Balqa in Jordan, Nablus in Palestine, and Homs in Syria governed by Ottoman rule between generations throughout the Arab caliphate. El-Assaads are considered now "Bakaweit" (title of nobility plural of "Bek" granted to a few wealthy families in Lebanon), and are considered princes or heirs to the family's dynasty to some.

Notable members:

- Nasif Al Nassar - ruler of Jabal Amel from the Al-Saghir Dynasty.
- Ali Al Saghir - a powerful leader of Jabal Amel.
- Khalil Bek El Assaad - appointed Ottoman Governor of Nablus, Al Balqa, Marjayoun, Tyre and Homs.
- Shbib Pasha El Assaad - minister of the Ottoman Empire, army leader.
  - Ali Nasrat El Assaad - advisor of the Court and a Superior in the Ministry of Foreign affairs in the Ottoman Empire.
- Kamil Bey (Esad) El-Assaad - representative of the Ottoman Empire in Beyrut.
  - Ahmed El Assaad - 3rd Legislative Speaker of Lebanon.
    - Kamel Bek El Assaad- 5th Legislative Speaker of Lebanon, Minister of Education, Minister of Water and Electricity, founder of Democratic Socialist Party (Lebanon).
      - Ahmad Kamel El Assaad - Lebanese Option Party founder, political candidate.
- Moustafa Nassar Bek El Assaad - Supreme Court President.
- Nael El Assaad - envoy for HM King Abdullah of Jordan and former husband of late Saudi magnate Adnan Khashoggi's sister Soheir.
- Said El Assaad - former Lebanese Ambassador of Switzerland, France and Belgium and a former Member of Parliament.
  - Bahija Al Solh El Assaad - wife of Said El Assaad, daughter of Prime Minister Riad Al Solh, aunt of Waleed Bin Talal.
- Nasrat El Assaad - ambassador of Lebanon to numerous countries.
- Haidar El Assaad - historian and among the first official delegates to visit the new People's Republic of China in the 1960s following Ministerial civil service – later serving as a director at the FAO of the United Nations and consultant to TRW and the World Bank.

== Bazzi family ==
The Bazzi family is a Lebanese Shia Muslim family that has been the largest family in Bent Jbeil, South Lebanon, for centuries. The Bazzi clan is spread across the Middle East from Lebanon to Iraq, Iran, and Yemen, and to Europe as far as Northern Italy, without confirmed connections among all regions. Its political presence has been established since the French mandate of Greater Lebanon with MP Ali Bazzi (Abu Hani). The family includes many notable politicians, academicians, military officers, journalists, political analysts, and writers.

Notable politicians include:

- Ali Bazzi (Abu Hani) – MP and one of the independence activists jailed by the French along with Bechara El Khoury and other founders of the independent Lebanon.
- Ali Ahmad Bazzi – MP and member of the Amal movement
- Mohammad Hussein Fadlallah – prominent twelver Shia cleric with strong ties to Hezbollah
- Wassim Bazzi – political analyst
- Afif Bazzi – president of the Municipality of Bint Jbeil

== Chamoun family ==
The Chamoun family is a Maronite family from the village of Deir El Qamar in the Chouf region of Lebanon.

Notable members:

- Camille Chamoun – President, 1952–58
  - Dany Chamoun – Militia leader and political party leader; son of Camille
    - Tracy Chamoun – Author and human rights activist; daughter of Dany
  - Dory Chamoun – former party leader; son of Camille
    - Camille Dory Chamoun – incumber party leader; son of Dory

== Daoud family ==
The Daoud family is a Druze political family from Rashaya. Politically, the family is represented by the Lebanese Arab Struggle Movement which Faisal Daoud headed between 1986 and 2014.

- Salim Daoud – Former MP
  - Faisal Daoud – Former party leader and MP; son of Salim
    - Tarek Daoud – Current party leader and parliamentary candidate; son of Faisal

== Daouk family ==
The Daouk family is a prominent Sunni Beirut family that stemmed in Ras Beirut, Lebanon during the 15th century; after fleeing Marrakesh, Morocco, the family escaped Morocco in the late 12th century from Marrakesh to the Levant during the Reconquista inquisition. The immigration came as a consequence of the heavy influx of refugees from the Iberian Peninsula. This was due to the heavy influx of Arab refugees coming from the Iberian Peninsula to the Maghreb and the Levant following the fall of Al-Andalus to the Catholic Monarchs.

Notable members:

- Omar Beik Daouk
- Ahmad Daouk
- Walid Daouk

== Eddé family ==
The Eddé family is Maronite family from the town of Jbeil also known as Byblos.

Notable members:

- Émile Eddé – President during the French Mandate
  - Raymond Eddé – political party leader; son of Émile
    - Carlos Eddé – opposition politician; nephew of Raymond
- Michel Eddé – lawyer and politician
  - Salim Eddé – Businessman and philanthropist; son of Michel

== Eid family ==
The Eid family is an Alawite political family that leads an Alawite community concentrated in the Jabal Mohsen neighborhood in Tripoli. The family founded the Arab Democratic Party which was founded in the early 70s by Ali Eid. Rifaat Eid has relations with the Syrian regime and fought during the Bab al-Tabbaneh–Jabal Mohsen conflict against Sunni armed militias who opposed the Syrian regime.

Notable members:

- Ali Eid – former General Secretary of the Arab Democratic Party; father of Rifaat
  - Rifaat Eid – General Secretary of the Arab Democratic Party; son of Ali

== Fakhoury family ==
The Fakhoury family is a prominent Greek Catholic family, It is one of the original aristocratic families of Saida, Fakhoury family can trace their roots to the Lebanese city of Rachaya Al Foukhar but they separated and some of them relocated to Saida where they bought a great amount of lands and got involved in the political decision of the South, while others spread in Keserwan and Matn area.

The Fakhoury family used to be one of the most important families of the South since 1785. After the turn of the 19th century they began to establish significant positions of power within the Ottoman empire where they were granted the title of بيكBeik. As a long line of land owners and tax collectors, the Fakhouries were able to leverage their finances and capital using their connections to American, British, French, German and Russian consuls over the decade to establish extensive economic and political connections.

Notable members:

- Nasser Fakhoury - General (Assassinated in South Africa 23-08-2016
- Maurice Beik Fakhoury - Political figure
- Kamal Beik Fakhoury - Political figure
- Wadih Beik Fakhoury - Businessman
- Shawki Fakhoury - Former Minister

== Frangieh family ==
Notable members:

- Suleiman Ghnatios Frangieh – Ehden governor
  - Kabalan Suleiman Frangieh – legislator; son of Suleiman
    - Hamid Beik Frangieh – politician; son of Kabalan
      - Samir Frangieh – politician and leftist intellectual; son of Hamid
    - Suleiman Frangieh – President (1970–76); brother of Hamid
      - Tony Frangieh – Cabinet Minister, Civil War militia leader; son of Suleiman
        - Suleiman Frangieh, Jr. – legislator and minister; son of Tony
          - Tony Frangieh, Jr. – legislator; son of Suleiman II
      - Robert Frangieh – Militia leader; son of Suleiman

== Gemayel family ==
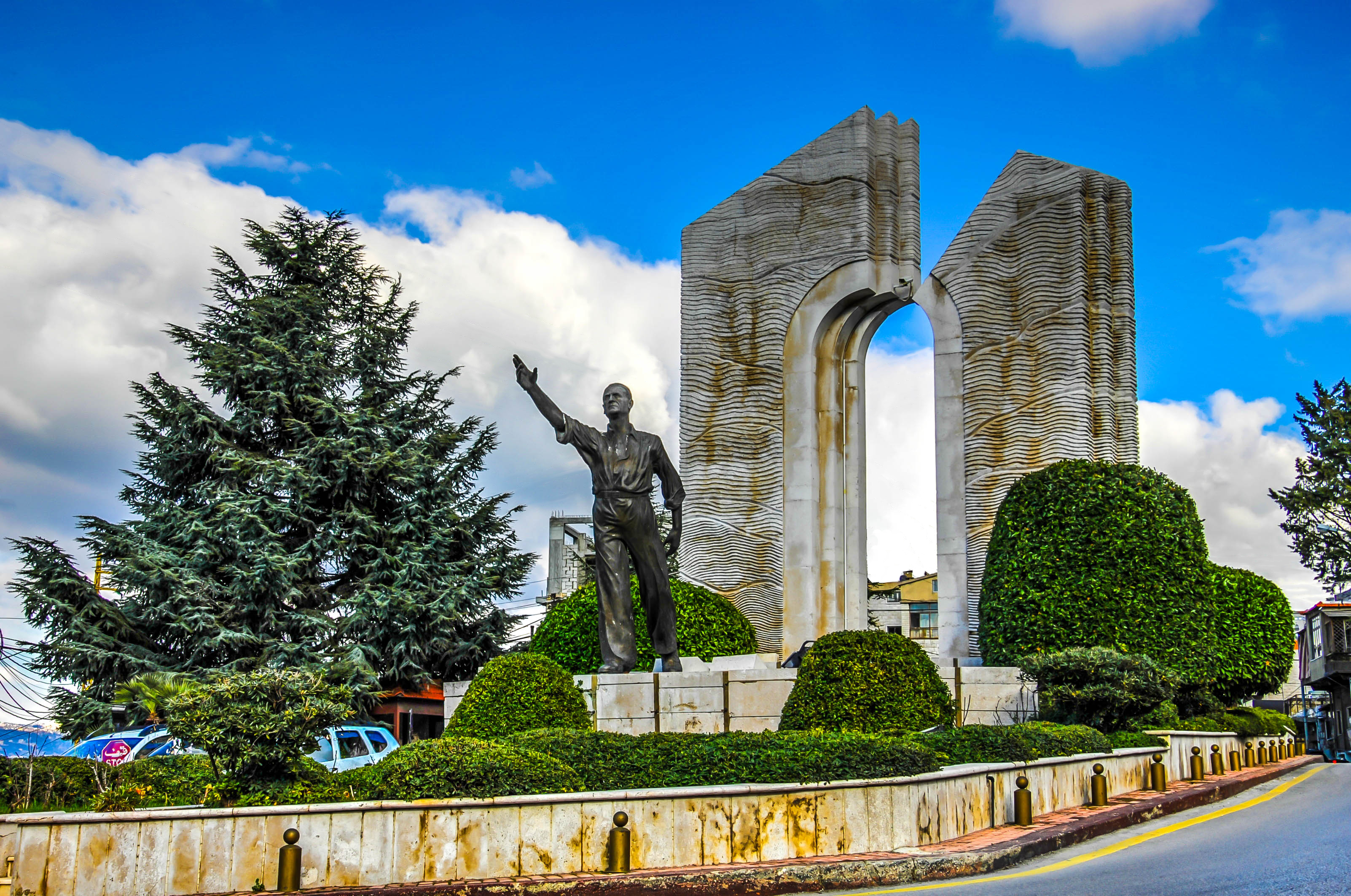
Pierre Gemayel memorial in Bikfaya

The Gemayel family is a Maronite political family in the region of Metn and West Beirut which is headquartered in the town of Bikfaya. The family is mentioned in bureaucratic records as among the inhabitants of Bikfaya as early as the 16th century. Between that time until the 18th century they were the sheikhs of the village. In 1642 Sheikh Abu Aoun was the joint governor of the subdistrict of Bsharri alongside the Druze chief Zayn al-Din of the Sawwaf family. Pierre Gemayel was the founder of the Lebanese Kataeb party (Phalange) as a paramilitary youth organization inspired by Spanish Falange and Italian Fascist parties and currently has 4 seats in parliament.

Notable members:

- Pierre Gemayel – Kataeb Party founder
  - Bachir Gemayel – President-elect, 1982; son of Pierre
    - Nadim Gemayel – Political activist; son of Bachir
  - Amine Gemayel – President, 1982–88; son of Pierre
    - Pierre Amine Gemayel – legislator; son of Amine
    - Sami Gemayel – Political activist; legislator; son of Amine
- Fouad Abou Nader – politician, grandson of Pierre I
- Geneviève Gemayel – political figure, pilot and artist; wife of Pierre I
- Maurice Gemayel – served several times as minister and MP for the Metn; in-law of Pierre I

== Hariri family ==
The Hariri family is a Sunni family from the town of Saida (Sidon) in the South of Lebanon.

Notable members:

- Nazik Hariri – widow of Rafic Hariri
- Rafic Hariri – 30th Prime Minister
  - Saad Hariri – 33rd Prime Minister; son of Rafic Hariri
  - Bahaa Hariri – Businessman; son of Rafiq
  - Hind Hariri – businesswomen; daughter of Rafiq Hariri
  - Ahmad Hariri – Party leader; Son of Rafic
  - Fahd Hariri – property developer; son of Rafic
- Bahia Hariri – former legislator; sister of Rafic

== Harb family ==
The Harb family, is a Maronite family that mainly rules in Tannourine, Batroun district, North Governorate, their political presence has been established since before the French mandate of Greater Lebanon, the family includes many notable politicians, academicians, military officers, journalists, political analysts, and writers.

The most prominent member of house Harb is Cheikh Boutros Harb who has been the head of the family and has served as a member of the Lebanese parliament from 1972 until 2018, with the addition to holding many ministries in his long political career, he also has been a presidential candidate and a strong critic of the Syrian regime and the Hezbollah policy in Lebanon.

Another prominent political member of house Harb is Cheikh Jean Harb the uncle of Cheikh Boutros Harb has served as an MP of the Batroun district from 1953 until 1972.

Also, Cheikh Majd Harb, son of Cheikh Boutros Harb, is a Lebanese lawyer and political and human rights activist, he presented several news, the first of which was about Hezbollah, accusing it of money laundering, smuggling and establishing a banking network in violation of the law (good loan), then about the President of the Lebanese Republic (Michel Aoun) and Prime Minister (Hassan Diab) after the explosion of the port of Beirut on August 4, 2020, because they did not take measures to remove dangerous materials that were stored in the port, which is considered a precedent in Lebanon's legal history, the latest of which is Lebanese ministers on charges of abusing power and embezzling public funds.

Also, Tom Harb is a Lebanese-American political activist and businessman, known for his strong advocacy for Lebanese sovereignty and independence. He is the founder and chairman of the TAYYAR (TAYYAR – The American Mideast Coalition for Democracy), which focuses on promoting democracy and human rights in the Middle East. Harb has been particularly vocal in opposing Syrian influence and Hezbollah’s role in Lebanon, and has been active within the Lebanese diaspora in the United States.

Mac Harb, is a Lebanese-born Canadian Politician who served successively in local Ottawa positions, as a Member of the House of Commons (1988-2003), and as a Senator for Ontario (2003-2013).

Notable members:

- Boutros Harb – MP (1972–2018)
  - Majd Harb – Political Activist and Parliamentary Candidate (2022–Present); son of Boutros
- Jean Harb – MP (1953-1972)
- Mac Harb – MP for Ottawa Centre (1988-2003)
- Tom Harb Chairman of TAYYAR (2006-present)

== Hobeika family ==
THe Hobeika family is a Maronite family from the village of Baskinta in the Metn region of Mount-Lebanon.

Notable members:

- Elie Hobeika – Member of Parliament and militia leader
- Gina Hobeika – Former Party leader; Wife of Elie
  - Joseph Hobeika – Party leader

== Jumblatt family ==
The Jumblatt family is a prominent Druze family based in the Chouf area of Mount Lebanon that has dominated Druze politics since the 18th century. The current head of the family is veteran politician Walid Jumblatt, the son and successor of Kamal Jumblatt, one of the most influential figures in modern Lebanese politics. Other members of the family have contributed to cultural, economic and social life in Lebanon. Khaled Jumblatt, a distant cousin of Walid Jumblatt, held the position of minister of economy and was a prominent politician in Lebanon for many years until his death in 1993. Besides the Chouf, the family owns mansions and villas within the distinguished Clemenceau area of Beirut and in the northwest area of Sidon.

Notable members:

- Fouad Jumblatt – clan leader in the Chouf region
  - Kamal Jumblatt – founder, Progressive Socialist Party, Cabinet Minister; son of Fouad
    - Walid Jumblatt – Civil War militia leader; Cabinet Minister; son of Kamal
      - Taymour Jumblatt – member of Parliament; son of Walid
      - Aslan Jumblatt – political candidate; son of Walid
- Nazira Jumblatt – clan leader in the Chouf region; widow of Fouad
- Khaled Jumblatt – former minister of economy; distant cousin of Walid

== Karam family ==
Notable members:

- Youssef Bey Karam – Lebanese Maronite notable who fought in the 1860 civil war and led a rebellion in 1866–1867 against the Ottoman Empire rule in Mount Lebanon
- Youssef Salim Karam – former MP from Zgharta
  - Salim Bey Karam – Current MP and former minister, son of Youssef Salim Karam

== Karami family ==
The Karami family is a Sunni political family in the city of Tripoli in Northern Lebanon. Members of this family traditionally held the position of mufti of Tripoli. The family is also known to adhere a strong Arab nationalist ideology as it runs the Arab Liberation Party, now known as the Dignity Movement.

Notable members:

- Abdul Hamid Karami (Prime Minister of Lebanon)
  - Rashid Karami – Prime Minister older son of Abdul Hamid
  - Omar Karami – Prime Minister younger son of Abdul Hamid.
    - Faisal Karami – former member of Parliament; son of Omar
- Mustafa Karami – founder of the National Youth Party
  - Ahmad Karami – former Minister of State; son of Mustafa

== Khazen family ==
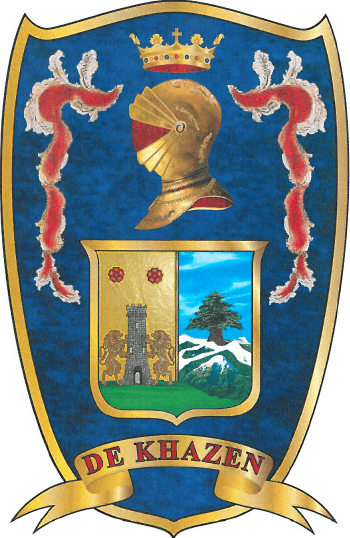
El Khazen family crest

The El Khazen family were very influential within the Maronite Church. Several members have played leading roles in politics for many generations. In modern times, Khazen have always represented Keserwan with at least one MP in the Lebanese Parliament. They have also been represented in many recent governments. Prominent politicians include Cheikh Philippe El Khazen, a prominent doctor and medical professor born in 1921 in Ghosta. Cheikh Philippe El Khazen was a member of the Parliament in 1968-1972 and a Co-Founder and Vice President of the Maronite League and Farid Haykal Khazen, incumbent MP.

Notable members:

- Wadih Nemr El Khazen – Lebanese Minister
  - Wadih Nemr El Khazen – President of the Central Maronite Council
- Farid Elias El Khazen – Lebanese Member of Parliament
  - Farid Haikal El Khazen – Lebanese Minister
- Philippe El Khazen – associate professor of medicine and politician
- Joseph Dergham El Khazen – Maronite Patriarch
- Joseph Ragi El Khazen – Maronite Patriarch
- Tobias El Khazen – Maronite Patriarch

== Lahoud family ==
The Lahoud family is a Maronite family from the village of Baabdat in the Metn region of Mount-Lebanon. Their members claim to have been the descendants and were a part of the Dhaou families of the Levant, they allegedly trace their origin back to Ghassanids. In modern politics, the family saw the likes of Emile Lahoud as the country's president who had close ties with the Syrian Al-Assad regime.

Notable members:

- Jamil Lahoud (1901–1983), general in the Lebanese Army and former minister and MP, father of president Emile Lahoud
  - Émile Lahoud (b. 1936), president of Lebanon from 1998 to 2007
    - Emile Lahoud Jr. (b. 1975), Lebanese politician, son of president Emile Lahoud
  - Nasri Lahoud – Head of the High Legal Magistrate, Military Judge (son of Jamil).
- Fouad Lahoud, (1912–1987), Lebanese Army officer and MP of Metn district between 1972 until his death, brother of Salim Lahoud
- Salim Lahoud (1910–1971), former Minister and MP of Metn District, brother of Fouad Lahoud
  - Nassib Lahoud (1944–2012), Lebanese politician, son of Salim
- Laura El Khazen Lahoud (1961-), Minister of Tourism, wife of Samir Lahoud

== Mghabghab family ==
The Mghabghab family is a Greek Catholic political family from the village of Ain-Zhalta in the Chouf region. The family is known to be allied with the National Liberal Party and having members that are viewed as Lebanese independence heroes.

- Naim Mghabghab – political leader and independence hero
  - Ghassan Mghabghab – political leader; son of Naim
- Joseph Mghabghab – lawyer and politician

== Mikati family ==
Notable members:

- Taha Mikati – Businessman; brother of Najib
  - Azmi Mikati – Businessman; son of Taha
- Najib Mikati – Prime Minister of Lebanon; brother of Taha

== Moawad family ==
The Moawad family is one of numerous Maronite Christian political families ruling in the region of Zgharta-Ehden. Rene Moawad was the 9th president of the republic and his widow, Nayla, founded the René Moawad Foundation, to further the goals of dialogue, peace, and social justice, to which they had dedicated their life. Nayla Moawad was elected to the National Assembly in 1991 and was a member of the Qornet Shawan Gathering. The eldest son of Rene, Michel Moawad, founded the Independence Movement, a reformist, Lebanese Nationalist party that goes against the Syrian Regime and the weapons of Hezbollah.

Notable members:

- Anis Moawad – regional politician
  - René Moawad – President (1989); son of Anis
    - Michel Moawad – Parliament member; son of Rene
- Nayla Moawad – legislator; widow of René

== Murr family ==
The Murr family is a Greek Orthodox family from the district of Metn who are notable for launching the Murr TV (MTV). Many of its members have held ministerial and parliamentary positions, most notably Michel El-Murr and his son Elias who made fortunes in Africa. The family is married into the Tueni family.

Notable members:

- Michel Murr; former member of parliament and Deputy Prime Minister of Lebanon
  - Elias Murr; former Deputy Prime Minister and Minister of the Interior and Municipalities; son of Michel
    - Michel Murr; member of parliament; son of Elias
  - Mirna Murr; head of the Federation of Municipalities of the Metn
- Gabriel Murr; politician and businessman who launched MTV in 1991; brother of Michel
  - Michel Gabriel Murr; businessman and CEO of Murr TV (MTV); son of Gabriel
- May Murr; political activist and professor; sister of Michel and Gabriel
  - Lina Murr Nehmé; author and professor; daughter of May

== Al-Musawi ==
The Al-Musawi is a Shi'ite political family. Members of this family are referred to by the anglicised version of their name. They are usually given the honorific title Sayyid before their first name, implying that a person is a direct descendant of the Islamic prophet Muhammad through his sixth generation grandson, Musa al-Kadhim.

Notable members:

- Abbas al-Musawi - (1952 - 16 February 1992) an influential Muslim Scholar and Secretary-General of Hezbollah from 1991-1992.
- Husayn Al-Musawi - Founded the now-dissolved Islamist militia Islamic Amal in 1982.
- Ibrahim Mousawi - Journalist and media relations officer.

== Osseiran family ==
The Osseiran family traces its Shia origins to what is now Iraq and there to the tribe of the Bani Asad, which fought alongside Hussein - the son of Ali and grandson of the prophet Mohammed - at Karbala in 680. After their defeat the survivors suffered persecution and after an unknown period of time one of the tribal members - Haidar - reportedly fled to Baalbek, where he had two sons: Ali and Osseiran. According to the family's historiography, the latter settled in Sidon/Saida. Historians have established that the Osseirans rose to prominence and power as grain merchants in Sidon and the Jabal Amel region of modern-day Southern Lebanon soon after the Ottoman Empire assumed control over the area in 1516.

Notable members:

- Adel Osseiran – statesman, a former Speaker of the Lebanese Parliament
  - Ali Osseiran – MP and former government minister; son of Adel
- Hassan Osseiran – Feudal owner
  - Sheikh Mohamad Osseiran – mufti of Saida and Zahrani districts of South Lebanon; son of Hassan

== Pakradouni family ==
Notable members:

- Karim Pakradouni – former Kataeb leader
  - Jihad Pakradouni – current MP; son of Karim
- Hagop Pakradouni – current MP representing the Armenian Revolutionary Federation in Lebanon

== Rassi family ==
The Rassi family is a Greek Orthodox family in the region of Akkar in North-Lebanon, which became known through the political legacy of Abdallah Rassi. The family has gained notability through the marriages its members to the Frangieh family.

Notable members:

- Abdallah Rassi – physician, former minister and former member of parliament
  - Karim Rassi – former member of parliament; son of Abdullah
- Suleiman Frangieh – politician and former party leader; father-in-law of Abdullah
- Elie Salem – former Deputy Prime Minister; father-in-law of Karim

== Saad family ==
The Saad family is a Sunni Muslim political family in the city of Sidon. The family is known to have founded the Popular Nasserite Organization which is currently led by the founder's son and MP, Osama Saad.

Notable members:

- Maarouf Saad – Lebanese politician and activist and founder of the Popular Nasserite Organization
  - Mustafa Saad – Lebanese politician and former secretary-general of the Popular Nasserite Organization; son of Maarouf
  - Osama Saad – Lebanese politician and secretary-general of the Popular Nasserite Organization; son of Maarouf

== Salam family ==
Notable members:

Amongst the most prominent Sunni Lebanese families from Beirut, the Salam [سلام] family traces their lineage to Qureshi tribes, in particular Banu Hashim and Bani Khalid. The family has given birth to a few Prime Ministers of the country.

- Salim Ali Salam – held many local offices in Beirut
  - Anbara Salam Khalidi – feminist activist; daughter of Salim
  - Saeb Salam – 8th Prime Minister of Lebanon; son of Salim
    - Tammam Salam – 49th Prime Minister of Lebanon and acting president of Lebanon; son of Seab
      - Nawaf Salam

== Skaf(f) family ==
The Skaff, also transliterated as Skaf, family is a Greek Christian political family based primarily in the city of Zahle. Family branches have been active in Lebanese politics for over a century, with the first modern Skaff politician having a seat in the first parliament of Lebanon. Today, the family is represented politically by the political party and electoral coalition the Popular Bloc which is led by Myriam Skaff, the widow of Elias Skaff.

Notable members:

- Elias Tohmeh Skaff - member of first parliament (1927)
- Jean Skaff - Member of parliament; first Kataeb Member to serve as government minister (minister of interim cabinet 1953)
- Joseph Skaff – held several ministerial positions; leader of the Seven Families of Zahle, an elite feudal coalition
  - Elias Skaff – Parliament member; son of Joseph
- Myriam Skaff – married into the Skaff family, from the Tawk family; party leader; widow of Elias
- Ghassan Skaff - Parliament member

== El Solh family ==
Notable members:

- Sami al Solh – 3rd Prime Minister
- Adel Al Solh – Politician; Cousin of Sami al Solh
- Riad El Solh – 1st Prime Minister; Grandfather of Al Waleed bin Talal Al Saud
  - Leila El Solh – Minister of Industry; Daughter of Riad al Solh
  - Bahija Al Solh El Assaad – wife of Said El Assaad, daughter of Riad Al Solh, aunt of Waleed Bin Talal.
- Takieddine Solh – 15th Prime Minister; Brother of Kazem Solh
- Kazem Al Solh – Diplomat; Member of Parliament
  - Raghid El-Solh – author and researcher; son of Kazem
- Kamel Ahmad Basha el Solh – High judge in the Ottoman Imperial Court
  - Afif al Solh – Parliament member of Syria
- Rachid Al Solh – 16th Prime Minister of Lebanon
- Waheed Al Solh – Activist; Politician; First cousin and husband of Mounira Al solh
- Mounira Al Solh – Political Activist; Parliament Candidate; First cousin and wife of Waheed Al solh
  - Sana Al Solh – Political Activist
- Ali El Solh- Lebanese-American physician, author, and researcher

== Sursock family ==
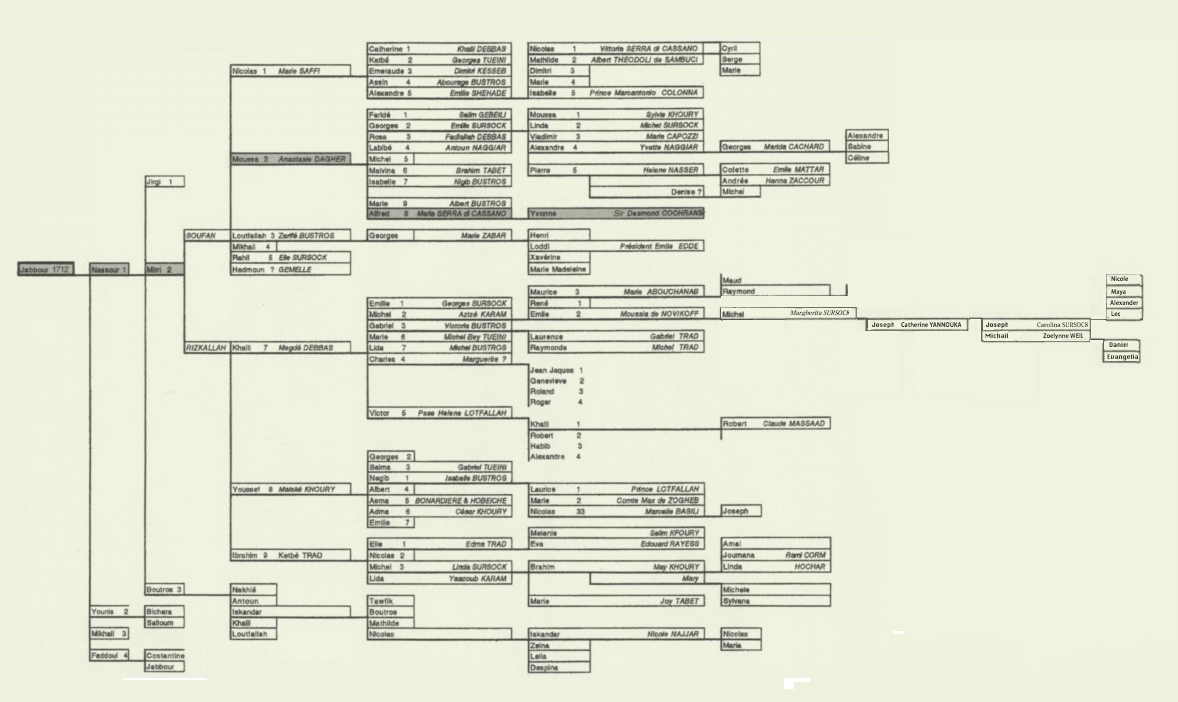
Sursock lineage since 1712

The Sursock family is a Greek Orthodox family and used to be one of the most important families of Beirut. Having originated in the Greek-Orthodox village of Barbara near Jubail, the family has lived in Beirut since 1712, when their forefather Jabbour Aoun (who later adopted the family name Sursock) left the village of Barbara. After the turn of the 19th century, they began to establish significant positions of power within the Ottoman Empire. The family, through lucrative business ventures, savvy political maneuvering, and strategic marriages, embarked on what Leila Fawaz called "the most spectacular social climb of the nineteenth century," and, at their peak, had built a close network of relations to the families of Egyptian, French, Irish, Russian, Italian and German aristocracies, alongside a manufacturing and distribution empire spanning the Mediterranean.

== Tawk family ==
Notable members:

- Gebran Tawk – Local leader; father of Myriam
  - Myriam Tawk – party leader; daughter of Gebran, married into the Skaff family
  - William Tawk – MP; son of Gebran
- Sethrida Tawk – MP and former Chairwomen of the Lebanese Forces; cousin of Myriam

== Tueni family ==
The Tueni family is a prominent Greek Orthodox family. It is one of the original aristocratic “Seven Families” of Beirut, along with the Bustros, Fayad, Araman, Sursock, Ferneini, and Trad families, who constituted the traditional high society of Beirut for a long time. The family is known for being the founders of Al-Nahar newspaper and for being critics of the Syrian government which costed the life of a March 14 member and Lebanese nationalist, Gebran Tueni.

Notable members:

- Gebran Tueni (journalist) – Lebanese journalist, founder of the newspapers Al Ahrar and An-Nahar
  - Ghassan Tueni – Lebanese journalist, ambassador, politician, government minister, Member of Parliament; son of Gebran I
    - Gebran Tueni – Lebanese journalist, politician, Member of Parliament, assassinated; son of Ghassan
      - Nayla Tueni – politician and former MP; daughter of Gebran Tueni
- Nadia Tueni – Lebanese Francophone poet; wife of Ghassan Tueni

== El Zein family ==
The El Zein family (الزين) is a prominent feudal Lebanese family, often associated with notable influence in various fields, including politics, business, and academia. The El Zein family has roots in the south of Lebanon, mainly in Shehour, Jibshit and Kfar Reman, though members may now be spread across different areas, both within the country and in the diaspora, unrelated to the Al-Zein crime family based in Germany.

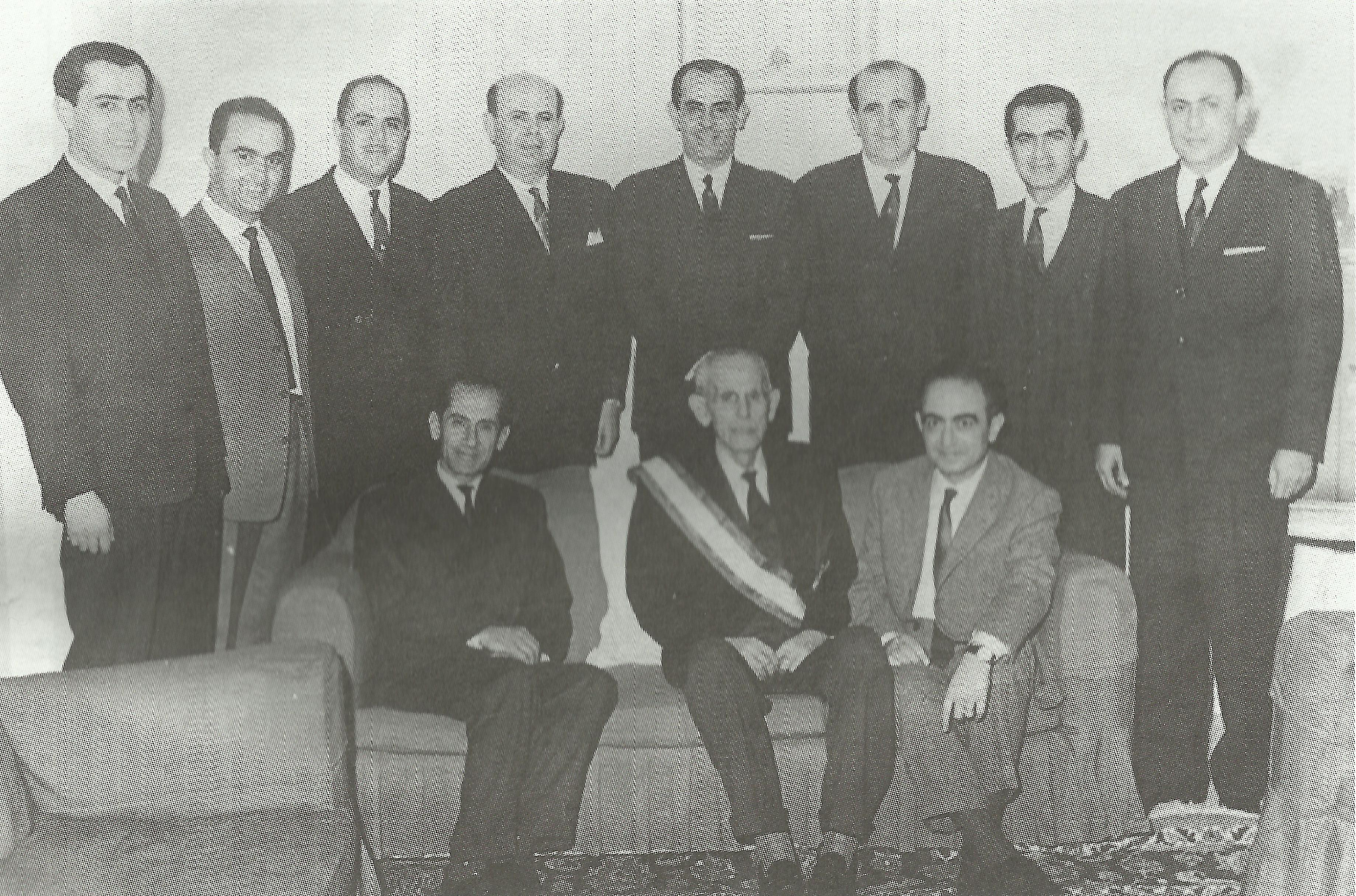
Youssef Bek El Zein with his ten children

Notable members:

- Youssef Bek El Zein – Politician, land owner and za'im of Kfar Reman
  - Abdul Latif El Zein – politician and former Member of the Lebanese Parliament; son of Youssef
  - Abdul Majeed El Zein – retired officer, politician and former Member of the Lebanese Parliament; son of Youssef
  - Abdul Karim Youssef El Zein – soldier, politician and former Member of the Lebanese Parliament; son of Youssef
- Sheikh Abdel-Karim El Zein- Influential cleric, poet, writer and land owner
- Sheikh Ahmad Aref El Zein - Founder of Al-Irfan magazine
  - Sheikh Ali El Zein - Renowned historian, writer and activist; son of Sheikh Abdel-Karim El Zein
    - Dr. Hassan El Zein - Author of 11 books, including: The judicial condition of Christians and Jews in Islam until the Ottoman Empire; son of Sheikh Ali El Zein
      - Jehad El Zein - Famous political commentator in the Middle-east, previous editor in As-safir newspaper and current writer in An-nahar newspaper; son of Dr. Hassan El Zein
      - Abbas El Zein - Professor at the University of Sydney and prize winner in non-fiction writing, notable works: Leave to remain, and Bullet Paper Rock; son of Dr. Hassan El Zein
      - Hekmat El Zein - Previous editor in chief of Hurriyat magazine in the René Mouawad Foundation, founder of the human rights association Gil and group CEO of companies in London, Dubai and Riyadh; son of Dr. Hassan El Zein
- Dr. Tamara El Zein – appointed environmental minister in Prime Minister's Salam's cabinet, which was confirmed by President Joseph Aoun on 8 February 2025.

== See also ==
- List of political families
- Za'im system
