= Osseiran =

Osseiran is an Arabic surname (Arabic: عسيران). Notable people with the surname include:

- Osseiran family, a famous Lebanese family
- Adel Osseiran, Lebanese politician and statesman, a former Speaker of the Lebanese Parliament
- Ali Osseiran, Lebanese politician, MP and former Lebanese government minister
- Sheikh Mohamad Osseiran, Jaafari mufti of Saida and Zahrani districts of South Lebanon, Lebanon
