= Dirani =

Dirani is an Arabic surname (Arabic: الديراني) and a subtribe of the Dombki Baloch tribe in Pakistan. Notable people with the surname include:

- Ali Dirani, Lebanese artist and musician
- Claudio Dirani, drummer for Italian pop band Modà
- Danilo Dirani, Brazilian race car driver
- Firass Dirani, Australian actor
- Hamza Dirani, Jordanian race car and kart driver
- Mustafa Dirani, Lebanese security head of the Amal Movement
- Zade Dirani, Jordanian and American composer and pianist
- Zeinab Dirani, wife of Sheikh Mohamad Osseiran, the Jaafari mufti of Sidon and Zahrani districts of South Lebanon
