= Ghosta =

Ghosta may refer to:

- Ghosta, Bihar, India
- Ghosta, Lebanon, Lebanon
- Ghosta, Afghanistan, a small village on the Kabul River
