= Georges Saadeh =

Lebanese politician

- جورج سعاده
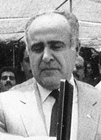

Member of Parliament
- In office 1968–1992
- Constituency: Batroun

Personal details
- Born: November 21, 1930
- Died: November 17, 1998 (aged 67)
- Party: Kataeb Party
- Other political affiliations: Tripartite Alliance

Georges Saadeh (Arabic: جورج سعاده) (November 21, 1930 – November 17, 1998) was a Lebanese politician. He was appointed as a minister in several governments and was the head of the Kataeb Party for twelve years.

== Early life and education ==
Saadeh was born in Chabtine, a small village in the caza of Batroun. He was the third child of a poor Maronite family of six boys. His father was a cavalier in the Lebanese Interior Security Forces. He studied Arabic literature at the Lebanese Academy for Fine Arts and then graduated with a PhD from the Salamanca University in Spain. He also continued to study law, and graduated with a degree in law from the Lebanese University.

== Political career ==
He entered the Kataeb Party at the age of 15. And after his return from Spain, he became Pierre Gemayel's advisor. Saadeh became one of the Kataeb's most acclaimed orators but was still an employee in the Lebanese Ministry of Education when the party asked him to run for the Batroun legislative election in 1968. That same year, he won a seat in Parliament and graduated from Law school.

He was elected as a Deputy to the Lebanese Parliament following the 1968 Lebanese General Election, representing the District of Batroun. His tenure lasted from 1968 to 1992, after which he boycotted the 1992 parliamentary elections. In 1986, Georges Saadeh became the head of the Kataeb Party after winning the party's elections over Dr Elie Karameh. He was supported by Pierre Gemayel's first camarades "the old guard" and by Samir Geagea's Lebanese Forces. He was head of the Kataeb Party from 1986 till his death in 1998 and head of the Lebanese Front after the death of the President of Lebanon Camille Chamoun. He was the main supporter of president-elect Bashir Gemayel who was elected at the second round of the 1982 presidential elections.

He held several ministerial positions: minister of planning in the government of Saeb Salam in 1972, minister of transportation and public works in the government of Rachid El Solh in 1974, and minister of telecommunication in the governments of Salim El Hoss in 1989, of Rachid Karami in 1990, and of Rachid El Solh in 1990.

In 1989, Georges Saadeh became a Christian leader and a supporter of the Taif Agreement. He was the subject of an attempted assassination by a car bomb in 1989 in Furn El Chebbak and survived a car bomb targeting the leadership meeting of the Kataeb Party in Beirut in December 1993.

== Death and legacy ==
In 1998, he wrote his book My story with the Taif Agreement in which he revealed secrets of the then-controversial agreement that is now acclaimed but died November 17, 1998, of cancer before the distribution of the book which was taken care of by his elder son.

He was outlived by wife, Lily El Khazen, and three children: Samer (member of Parliament between 2009 and 2017 representing the Kataeb Party parliamentarian bloc), Myra and Rami. His son Samer decided to pursue the political work.
