= Batha =

Batha may refer to:

- Batha Region, one of the regions of Chad
- Batha Prefecture, a former division of Chad
- Batha, Lebanon, one of the villages in Keserwan District in Lebanon
- Batha, an alternate term for garrigue, or Mediterranean scrubland
- Al-Batha (Riyadh), a commercial area in Riyadh, Saudi Arabia
- Batha (demon) a kind of daemon in Kerala
