= Mounir Abou Fadel =

Lebanese politician and British general (1912–1987)

His Excellency Mounir Abou Fadel منير أبو فاضل OM, ONC
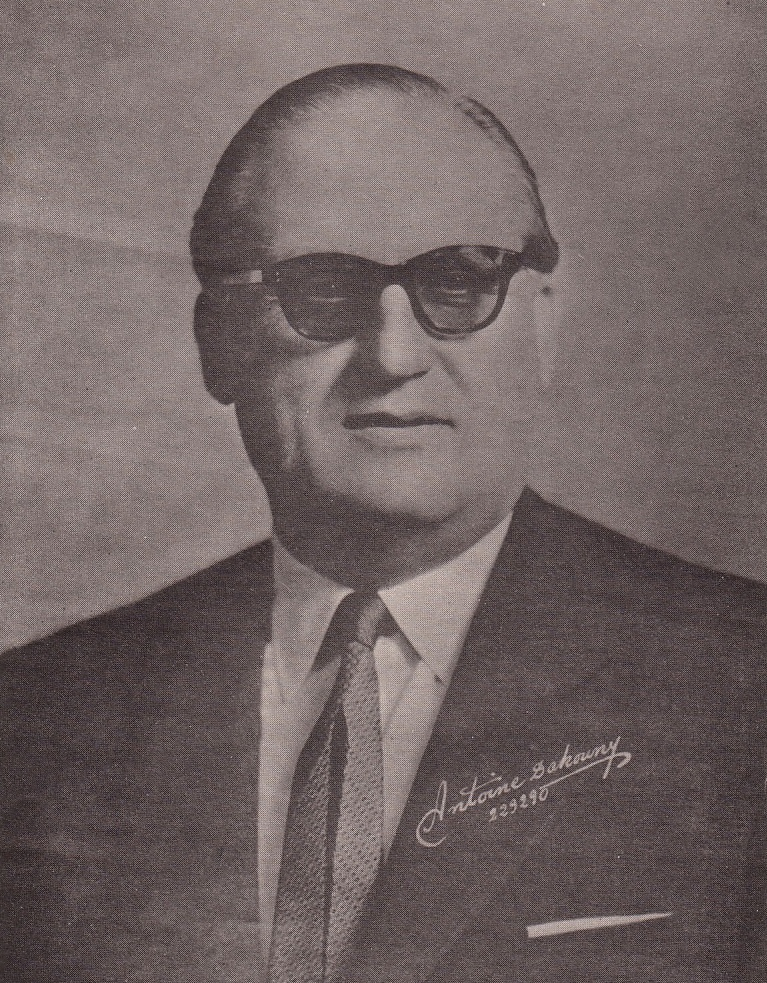

Deputy Speaker of the Parliament of Lebanon

Member of the Lebanese Parliament
- In office 30 June 1957 – 29 January 1987

Personal details
- Born: June 5, 1912 Ain Aanoub, Beirut Vilayet, Ottoman Empire
- Died: January 29, 1987 (aged 74) Beirut, Lebanon
- Spouse: Reine Mokhbat
- Children: 3, including Marwan Abou Fadel
- Occupation: Politician

Mounir Abou Fadel (Arabic: منير أبو فاضل) (June 5, 1912 – January 29, 1987) was a Lebanese politician. He was a member of the Lebanese Parliament for thirty consecutive years (1957–1987) representing the district of Aley, Mount Lebanon.

== Personal background ==
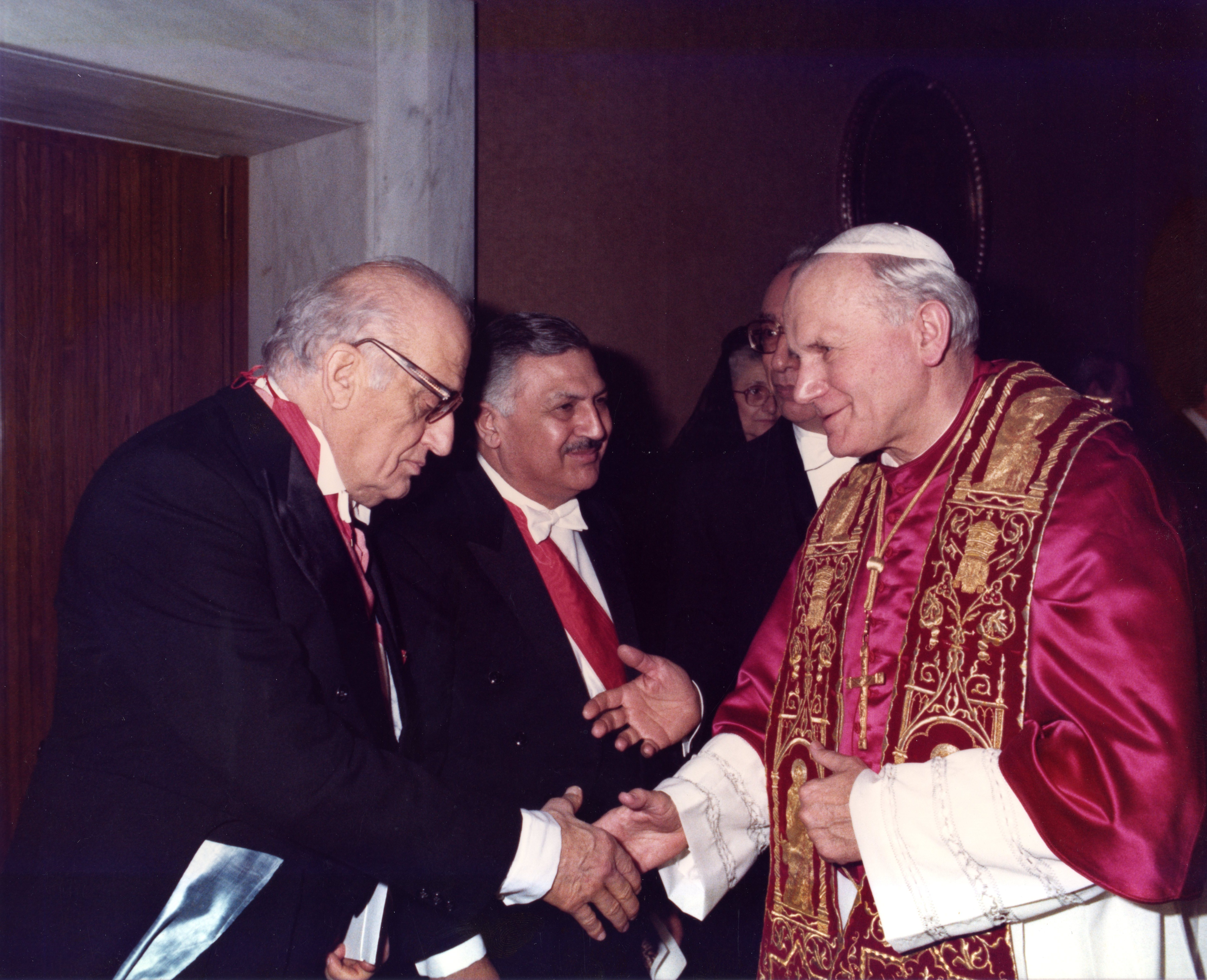
Mounir Abou Fadel - Official visit to the Vatican - Pope Jean Paul II

Abou Fadel was born to a prominent Greek Orthodox family in Ain Aanoub to parents Habib Abou Fadel (1850–1927), a judge and Kaymakam, and Jamileh Saadeh. His uncle Youssef Abou Fadel (1837–1892), also a judge, was a member of the first administrative council of the Mount Lebanon Mutasarrifate, from 1861 to 1864.

Abou Fadel studied law at universities in Jerusalem. His books include The Lebanon Issue, The Palestine War Has Not Ended, in addition to several political articles in the major Lebanese newspapers.

He married Reine Mokhbat in 1957. They had three children: Marwan, born 1958, a local political figure and former MP of Mount Lebanon; Rafic, born 1960, a diplomatic adviser; and Mila, born 1964, an associative and social Lebanese figure.

== Professional background ==
Abou Fadel became a Member of the Lebanese Parliament for Mount Lebanon, serving from 1957 to 1987. He was Deputy Speaker of the Parliament of Lebanon, having been elected over 20 times. He was the 4th personality in the Lebanese state hierarchy.

Prior to entering the political field, he was a high-ranking officer in the British Army in Mandatory Palestine and conducted his troops to Beirut during the May–June 1945 crisis in Lebanon and Syria between France and Britain. He ended his military career as Brigadier General. He is considered as one of the founders of the Lebanese Army.

Abou Fadel was also head of general security in Mandatory Palestine and the highest Arab officer serving the mandate.

== Awards ==
22, including: Two Vatican's distinctions, 12 British distinctions and 1 from the Orthodox Patriarchate.

Ribbon bar	Country	Honour
	Lebanon	Grand Cordon of the Lebanese National Order of the Cedar
	Lebanon	Grand Cordon of the Lebanese Order of Merit
	Greece	Grand Commander of the Order of the Phoenix
