= Walid Khazen =

Lebanese diplomat

Walid Khazen (also Walid el-Khazen; born 5 September 1946, in Beirut, Lebanon) is a Lebanese diplomat and a member of the noble Khazen family.

== Education ==
Walid received his bachelor's degree from the International College in Beirut, and he received licenses in French and Lebanese law from the University of Lyon and Saint Joseph University, respectively. In addition, he studied at University College London.

== Work ==
He has served as a lawyer. He was the ambassador from the Sovereign Military Order of Malta to Jordan. He was awarded a Grand Cross in the Order pro Merito Melitensi in 2016.

== Personal life ==
He is a member of the Maronite Church. He has a wife, Gloria, and four children (Sari, Chafic, Nour, and Tayma).
