= Ajaltoun =

Ajaltoun عجلتون
- Municipality
- Location within Lebanon
- Coordinates: 33°58′4″N 35°41′6″E
- Country: Lebanon
- Governorate: Keserwan-Jbeil
- District: Keserwan

Area
  - Total: 6.12 km^{2} (2.36 sq mi)
- Lowest elevation: 850 m (2,790 ft)
- Time zone: UTC+2 (EET)
  - Summer (DST): UTC+3 (EEST)
- Dialing code: +961

Ajaltoun (Arabic: عجلتون, romanized: ʿAjaltūn) is a town and municipality in the Keserwan District of the Keserwan-Jbeil Governorate in Lebanon. It is located 24 km (15 miles) north of Beirut. Ajaltoun's average elevation is 850 meters (2800') above sea level and its total land area is 612 hectares (1510 acres). The municipality consists of a twelve-member council, which as of 2025 was headed by Elie Sfeir with the Kelna Sawa list. In addition to the municipal council, two mukhtars (headmen), Abi Chaker and Jacko, also serve the town. The Virgin Mary Church, built by the Khazen sheikhs in 1647, the Saint Nicolas Church and the Mar Shalita Monastery are located in Ajaltoun. The town was also the site of fighter plane crash during World War I.

== Etymology ==
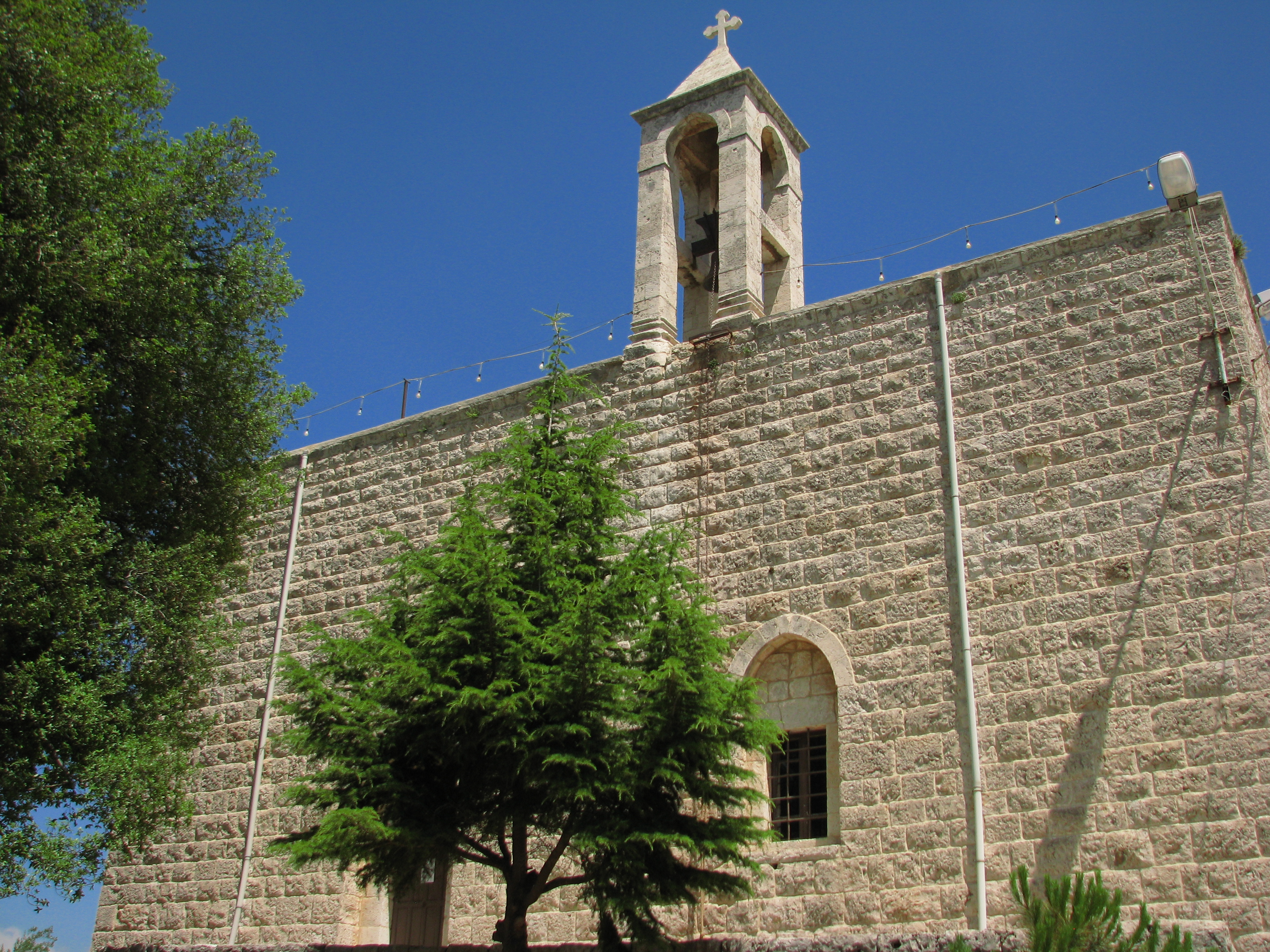
Deir Mar Challita church in Ajaltoun.

Ajaltoun's name comes from the Arabic root word ′aajel, which could mean "calf", "to roll" or "wheel". An alternative theory for the town's etymology are that it originates from the Phoenician word for "statue" or "round area".

== History ==
Ottoman tax records indicate Ajaltoun had 23 Christian households and three bachelors in 1523, 19 Muslim households and one bachelor in 1530, and 19 Christian households in 1543. The Khazen family of Ballouneh in Keserwan settled in the village in 1606.

== Demographics ==
Ajaltoun had an estimated population of 10 000, who live in a total of 2,500 homes and operate 175 businesses. In 2009, there were 2,524 registered voters in the town. Most of the inhabitants are Maronite Catholics, although there are minorities of Melkite Catholics and Greek Orthodox Christians. The principal families in relative order of size are Sfeir, Ghosn, Ghanem, Harouni, Khalife, Mdawar, Zoghbi, Mrad, Khazen, Abi Chaker and Kassis.

== Notable People associated with Ajaltoun ==
- Joseph Ragi El Khazen, 69th Maronite Catholic Patriarch of Antioch, born in Ajaltoun, 1791.
- Amine Khazen, Lebanese diplomat, former Lebanese ambassador to the United Nations, Mexico, and Central America, born in Ajaltoun, 1941.
- Carlos Ghosn, former Chairman of CEO of Renault and Nissan, and former Chairman of Mitsubishi Motors, whose grandfather emigrated from Ajaltoun to Brazil.
- Kim Philby, British intelligence officer and a double agent for the Soviet Union, lived for a time in Ajaltoun.
- Helen Khal, American-Lebanese artist, critic, and American University of Beirut and Lebanese American University professor, died in Ajaltoun, 2009.
- Samir Medawar, Professor of Agricultural Sciences and former Dean of the Faculty of Agriculture at Lebanese University, former expert with the UN Food and Agriculture Organization, born in Ajaltoun, 1956.
- Joya-Maria Azzi, Lebanese footballer playing for the Central Methodist Eagles and the Lebanon women's national football team, born in Ajaltoun, 2000.

== Economy ==
The main source of income in Ajaltoun is derived from tourism, and there are four hotels and seven restaurants in the town. An annual festival dedicated to Saint Zakhia is held in Ajaltoun in the last days of August.

INDEVCO Group, an international group of manufacturing companies, is headquartered in Ajaltoun.

== Education ==
There are five schools in Ajaltoun, including Ajaltoun Public School, Mar Mansour Sisters for Charity and the Ajaltoun Foundation for Arts. The Antonine International School, an institute for higher education, is also located in Ajaltoun.

== Bibliography ==
- Bakhit, Muhammad Adnan Salamah (February 1972). The Ottoman Province of Damascus in the Sixteenth Century (PhD). School of Oriental and African Studies, University of London.
- van Leeuwen, Richard (1994). Notables and Clergy in Mount Lebanon: The Khāzin Sheikhs and the Maronite Church, 1736–1840. Leiden, New York and Koln: Brill. ISBN 90-04-09978-6.
