= Al Nida (newspaper) =

Daily newspaper in Lebanon (1930–1940)

- Type: Daily newspaper
- Owner: Kazem Al Solh
- Founder: Kazem Al Solh
- Editor-in-chief: Kazem Al Solh
- Founded: 1930
- Ceased publication: 1940
- Political alignment: Arab nationalism
- Language: Arabic; French
- Headquarters: Beirut
- Country: Lebanon

Al Nida (Arabic: النداء, lit. 'The Appeal') was a daily newspaper which was published in Beirut, Lebanon, in the period 1930–1940. The paper also had a French language edition. It is known for being one of the first Arabic newspapers which featured translations of Adolf Hitler's book Mein Kampf.

== History and profile ==
Al Nida was established by Kazem Al Solh in Beirut in 1930. He also owned and edited the paper which ceased publication in 1940. It was published daily in Arabic, but also had a French edition. The paper was consisted of eight pages.

Al Nida had an Arab nationalist political stance. Although the daily was based in Beirut, most of its readers were in Damascus, Palestine, Transjordan and Iraq. From January 1934 Arabic translations of Adolf Hitler's book Mein Kampf were published in Al Nida. It was translated into Arabic by Kamel Mrowa, an editor of the paper. The publication of these texts led to criticisms in the country. In response Kazem Al Solh published an editorial to explain his position in regard to the Hitler's ideology stating that he did not support Hitler's race-based theories. On the other hand, Al Solh was a supporter of Hitler’s strategy to revitalize and preserve his nation and national identity. The paper also covered other anti-Semitic materials. During its existence Al Nida was banned several times.
