= Antonine International School =

- Ajaltoun; Lebanon

Antonine International School (AIS, French: École internationale Antonine) is an international school in Ajaltoun, Lebanon. The school serves levels preschool, through senior high school. As part of the Antonine Maronite Order, it offers an English section and a French section, with Lebanese students in both sections participating in mother language programme. The AEFE accredits the French section.
