= Amine Khazen =

Lebanese diplomat

Amine Khazen (also Amine el-Khazen; born 6 December 1941, in Ajaltoun, Lebanon) is a Lebanese diplomat and a member of the noble Khazen family.

== Education ==
Amine primarily studied at Saint Joseph University, in Beirut. He is fluent in Arabic, French, English, and Spanish.

== Work ==
He was the Lebanese ambassador to the United Nations from 1990 to 1999. He also served as an ambassador in Mexico and Central America. His diplomatic work has put him in contact with high-profile figures from around the world, including Pope John Paul II and Fidel Castro.
