= Farid Haykal Khazen =

Lebanese politician

Farid Haykal el Khazen فريد هيكل الخازن
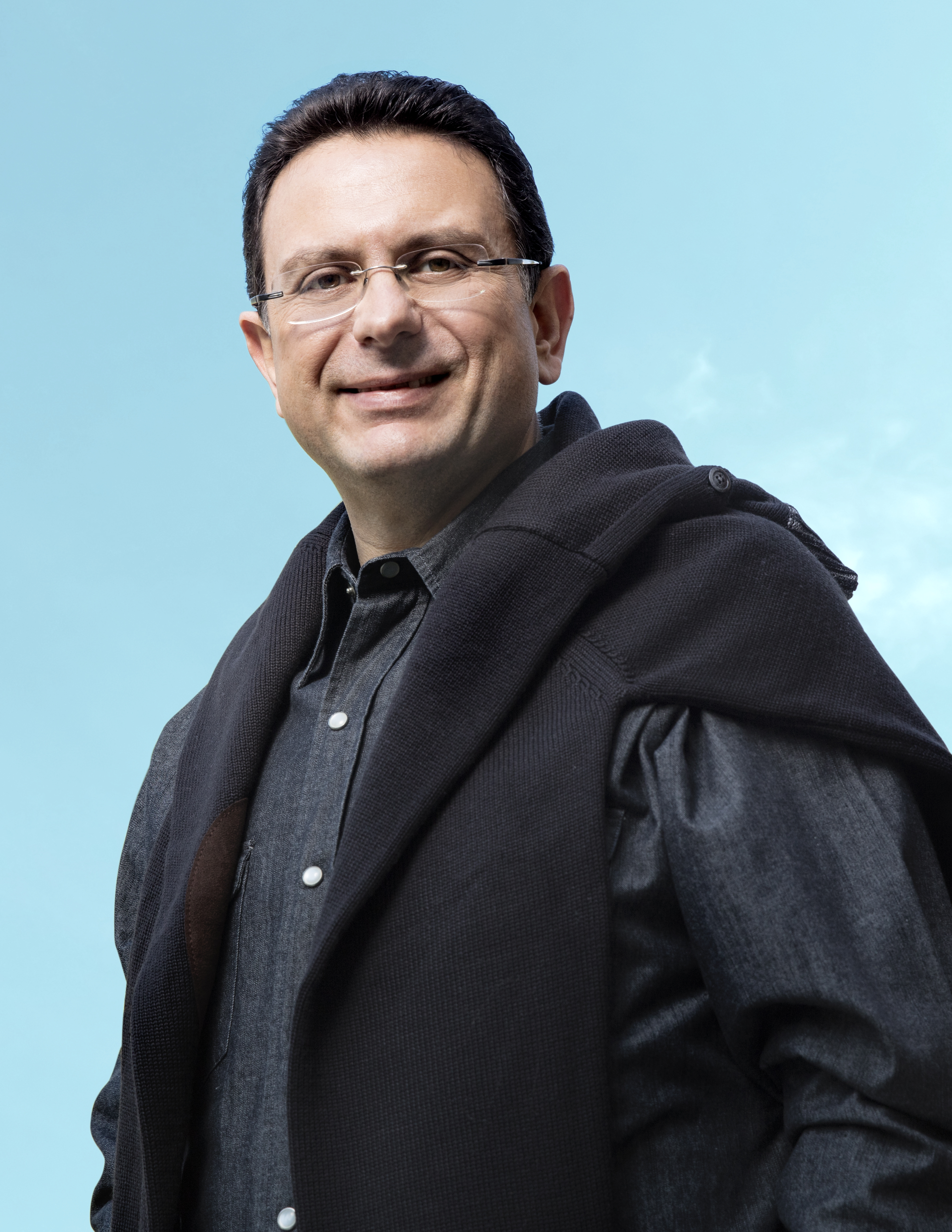
- Farid Haykal Khazen in 2018

Member of the Lebanese Parliament
- Incumbent
- Assumed office 15 May 2018
- Constituency: Kesserwan (2018, 2022)
- In office 3 September 2000 – 20 June 2005
- Constituency: Kesserwan (2000)

Minister of Tourism
- In office 26 October 2004 – 19 February 2005
- Prime Minister: Omar Karami

Personal details
- Born: 13 September 1970 (age 56)
- Party: Independent
- Spouse: Mona Nakhle El Khazen
- Children: 3
- Education: Saint Joseph University

Farid Haykal Khazen (Arabic: فريد هيكل الخازن; born September 13, 1970) is a Lebanese politician and member of the Al Khazen family.

== Career ==
Heir to the Khazen political family, he was elected Maronite MP for Kesserwan District in 2000 and was one of the youngest members of the Lebanese Parliament. In October 2004, within the government of Omar Karami, he was appointed Minister of Tourism. He resigned from the government on 18 February 2005, four days after the assassination of Rafik Hariri, in protest against the government's inaction and sensing the scale of the popular movement that was looming.

He ultimately joined the opposition and participated in the June 2005 legislative elections on the March 14 Alliance force list, creating surprise by breaking his alliance and turning his back on former minister Fares Boueiz. Nevertheless, he failed to get elected, like all his running mates, against the list led by Michel Aoun.

9 years after the last parliamentary elections, Farid Haykal El Khazen was re-elected to the Lebanese parliament, receiving more than 9000 votes in Kesserwan-Ftouh and Byblos, in the parliamentary elections on May 6, 2018, after he joined forces with Chaker Salame (Kataeb party), Youssef Salameh, Gilberte Zouein and Yolande Khoury in Kesserwan-Ftouh, and Fares Souaid, Mustapha Husseini (Hussein Husseiny sibling) and Jean Hawat under the list of Aanna Al Karar. He subsequently joined the National Coalition Bloc alongside the Marada Movement and other independent MPs.

The Al-Watani Bloc gathers MPs Farid Haykal el Khazen, Mostapha El Husseini, Tony Frangieh, Jihad el Samad, Istephan Doueihy, Fayez Ghosn, Faisal Karami.
