= 1968 Lebanese general election in Koura District =

Voting to elect two members of the Lebanese parliament took place in the Koura District (a rural area in northern Lebanon) in 1968, part of the national general election of that year. Both of the seats of the constituency were earmarked for the Greek Orthodox community (for more information about the Lebanese election system, see Elections in Lebanon). Koura District had 31,531 eligible voters, out of whom 13,753 voted. Three tickets contested the election. The election was marred by violent incidents and threats.

== Candidates ==
Filip Bulus and Fuad Ghusn, two incumbent parliamentarians and members of the Democratic Front, ran on a joint ticket. Bulus was a prominent politician and lawyer, first elected to parliament in 1951. He had been appointed as governor of Beirut Governorate in 1966, and served in different ministerial functions. Fuad Ghusn was also a lawyer by profession, educated in Paris. He had served in different ministerial cabinets. The Bulus-Ghusn ticket represented the local elites.

Two physicians, Jamil al-Burji (seen as pro-Communist) and Bakhous Hakim (independent, but linked to the Syrian Social Nationalist Party), ran on a joint ticket. Faruq Talib was another candidate, running on his own.

== Results ==
Bakhous Hakim and Fuad Ghusn were elected.

Candidate	Votes
Bakhus Hakim	6,615
Fuad Ghusn	6,293
Filip Bulus	5,829
Jamil al-Burji	5,629
Faruq Talib	532
