= Marwan Abou Fadel =

Lebanese politician

Marwan Abou Fadel مروان أبو فاضل

Member of the Lebanese Parliament
- In office 1992–1999
- Prime Minister: Rafic Hariri
- Constituency: Aley

Vice-Chairman of the Lebanese Democratic Party
- Incumbent
- Assumed office 2001
- President: Talal Arslan

Personal details
- Born: 23 December 1958 Ain Aanoub, Lebanon
- Parent: Mounir Abou Fadel (father)
- Occupation: Lawyer, politician

Marwan Abou Fadel (Arabic: مروان أبو فاضل) is a Lebanese politician and a former Member of Parliament for the Greek Orthodox seat of Aley, in Mount Lebanon.

== Early life and education ==
Abou Fadel was born in Ain Aanoub, Lebanon in 1958 to a Lebanese Greek Orthodox family. He is the son of the late Mounir Abou Fadel.

He holds a degree in law from the University of Paris, Assas and master's degree in political science, also from France.

== Political career ==
Abou Fadel entered political life in 1983 when he became the director of his father's office. He is a former MP of Mount Lebanon, co-founder and vice-chairman of the Lebanese Democratic Party.

He was elected in 1992 as a deputy for the Aley district.

Since 2014, he is the secretary general of the Lebanese Orthodox Gathering (اللقاء الأرثوذكسي).
