= Philippe Ziade (journalist) =

Lebanese journalist (1909 – 2005)

Philippe Ziade (1909 in Ghosta, Mount Lebanon - June 2005) was a pioneer Lebanese journalist.

== Life ==
Ziade attended the 'Ain Warqa school; he was one of the first journalists in French-mandated Greater Lebanon. He founded the 'National News Agency' or NNA (الوكالة الوطنية للانباء), the first national news agency in Lebanon in the 1920s and contributed for more than half a century to more than 30 daily newspapers in the Lebanese press among which An-Nahar, Le Jour, L'Orient, Le Soir, Al-Hayat, and As-Siyassah. Ziade's office was in the Grand Serail, the current headquarters of the Prime Minister of Lebanon.

== Awards ==
He is the recipient of numerous national decorations including the 1958 Honorary Lebanese Golden Medal of Merit, bestowed to him by president Camille Chamoun. In 2003 he was awarded the medal of the Lebanese Press Syndicate and the Lebanese Order of Journalists, and upon his death in 2005 the National Order of the Cedar (Officer), bestowed by president Emile Lahoud).
