= Ali Dirani =

Lebanese artist and musician

Ali Dirani (born 1986 in Ryak, Bekaa, Lebanon) is a Lebanese graphic and visual artist, musician and drummer.

== Education ==
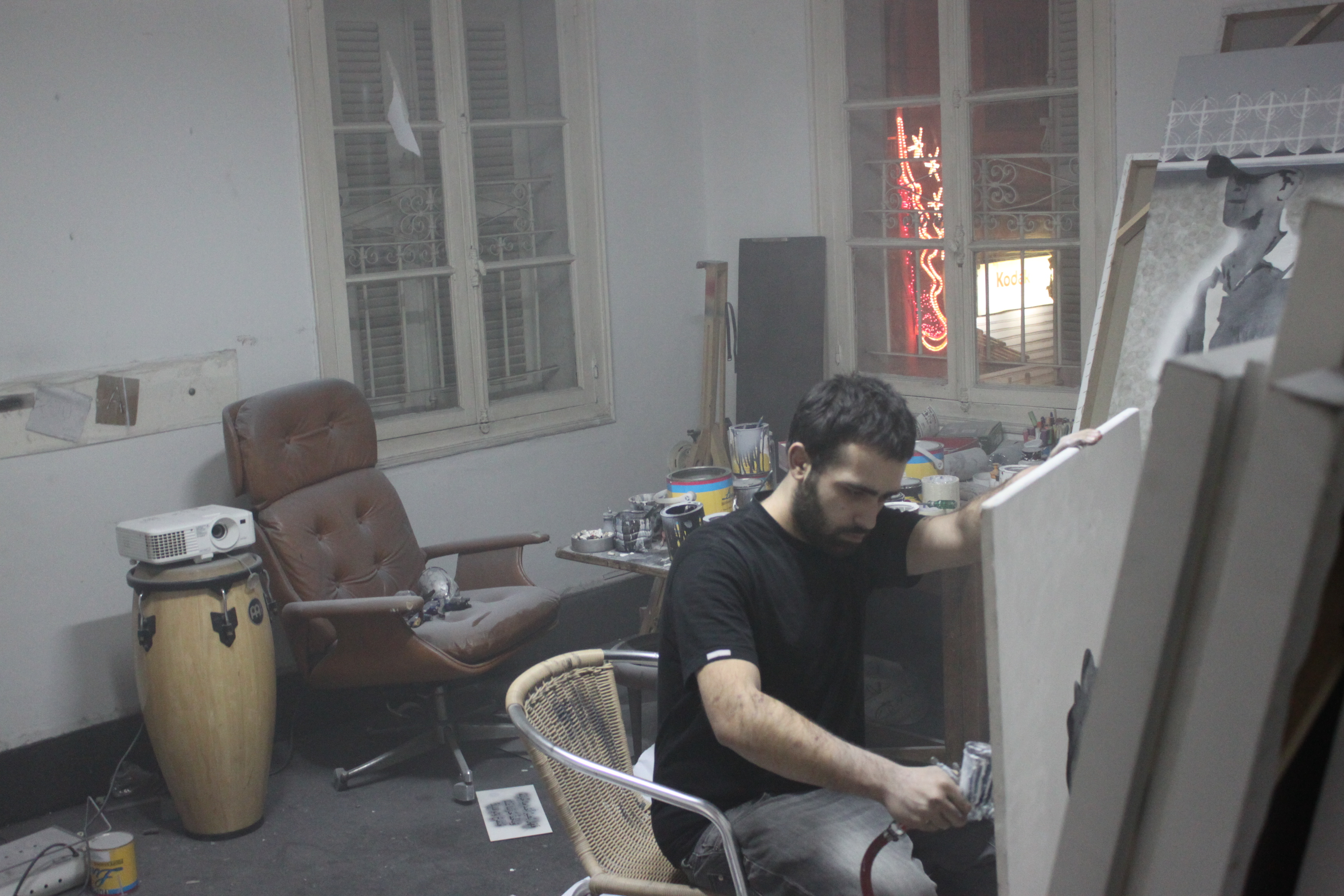
Ali Dirani

He graduated from the Fine Arts Institute of the Lebanese University and held his first solo exhibition, "FRONT ROW", at the age of 24. This art exhibition consisted of nitrocellulose on canvas and neo-realism. It introduced 11 works with a conceptual approach.

== Career ==
Dirani worked as an art director for independent projects, production houses and commercial companies. Specifically, he made video clips and commercial adverts with City Film, Signature, MBC, macchina, Saatchi and Saatchi, Leo Burnett and other production houses, collectives and companies.

The artist worked on the scenography of the opening show of the 25th Al Janadriyah festival. The concept was to create an authentic looking desert fused with a wide theatre edged with Arabesque patterns. It included a gigantic moving falcon and a helicopter in true scale. The artist worked along with Italian international art directors who are involved in cinematic scenography and are collaborators of award-winning movies such as Star Wars and Gangs of New York.

== Solo exhibition: Front Row ==
Ali Dirani's first solo exhibition, Front Row, confronts local affairs with no holds barred. The exhibition includes his airbrushed pieces like "Statut Social" and an adaptation of the statue on Martyrs' Square. Dirani designed his adaptation statue with a gun in her hand, criticising the country's sense of national pride approach.

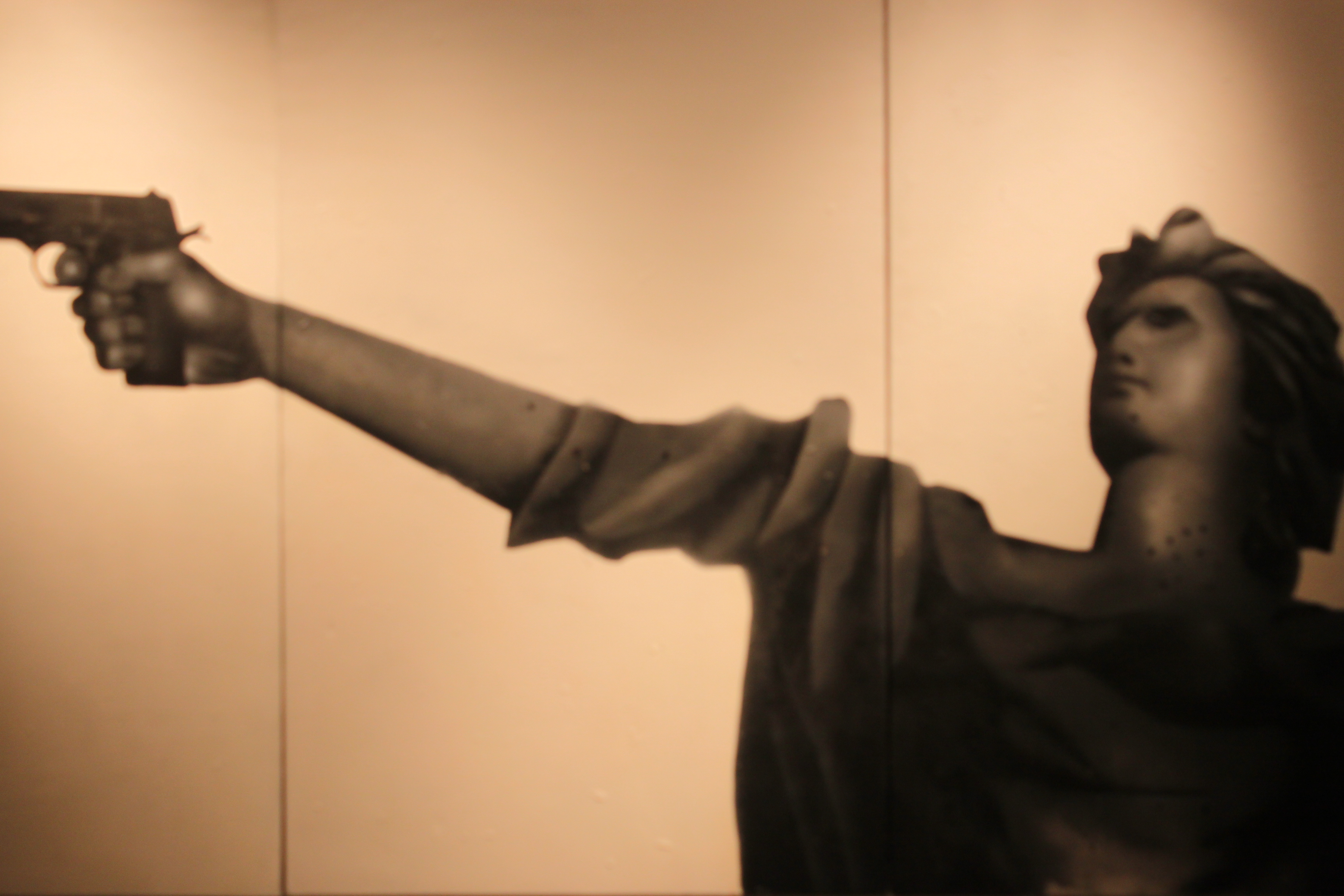
Status social: Martyrs didn't go carrying a torch, it was mostly guns. In the honor of their memory the alternative genuine (Statut Social) is presented. It's a call for citizenship outside the confessional and typical borders of Lebanon.

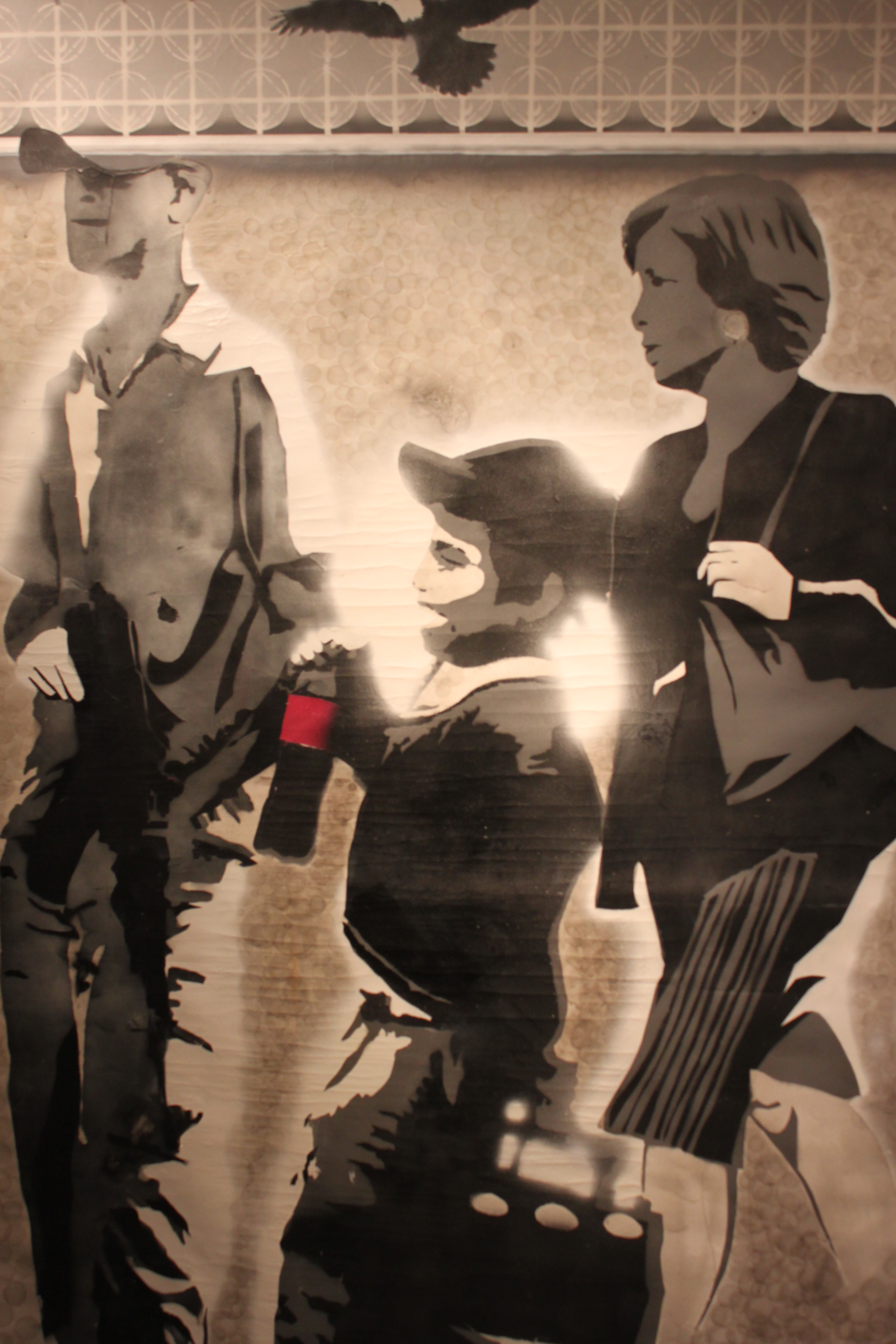
Passion show.

== Music ==
Dirani is a professional dub and jazz drummer and percussionist.

== Al Janadriyah Festival ==
Dirani worked on the scenography of the opening show of the 25th Janadriyah festival. The concept was to create an authentic-looking desert fused with a wide theatre with Arabesque patterned edges. It included a gigantic moving falcon and a helicopter in true scale. The artist worked along with Italian international art directors who are involved in cinematic scenography and conducted a high number of awarded movies such as Star Wars and Gangs of New York.

== Anti-sectarian campaign in Lebanon ==
Dirani is an activist in the anti-sectarian campaign in Lebanon. In his interview with the Daily Star, he said "sectarian political leaders are trying to take advantage of the movement and adopt it, under their principles, but we have rejected such acts."

"If they believe that [our cause] is just, let them resign from their parties and they will be more than welcomed with us as ordinary members," he said.

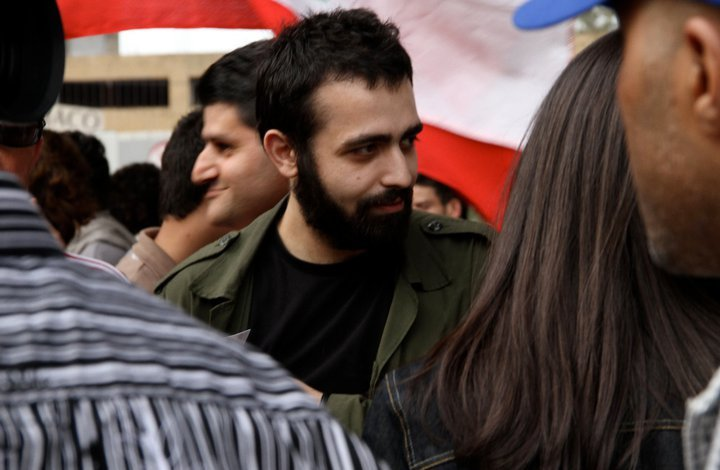
anti confessional demonstration.

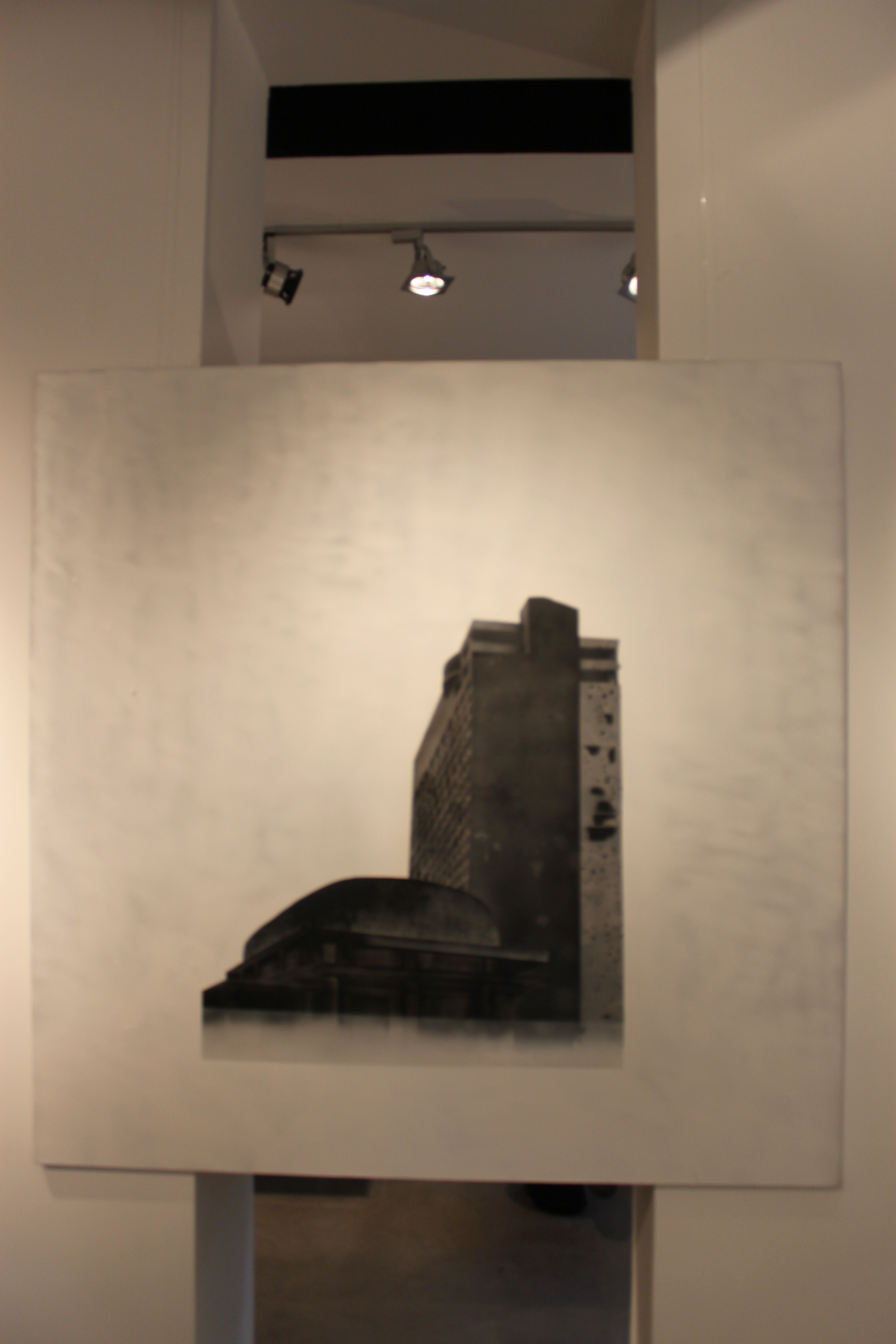
When the forced amnesia reigns, its only better to take a relatively modern piece of architecture and save it with its comrades, so its inhabitants don't fall and be ready for another round. It's only a piece of art that was collectively recomposed and sketched by the only true memory of the city.

== Comic series ==
Ali Dirani published a comic series in Al Samandal magazine called "Musba7", where he put local conventions and traditions into question.

== Triangulated City ==
Dirani was an associate member of the Triangulated City. The Triangulated City is a live art event that investigates notions of exchange within the urban environment through the secrets, rumours, messages, myths and memories circulating in a city. Zoukak Theatre Company and Cultural Association hosted Lotos Collective (London/New York) and in collaboration with invited participants, devised the project through a series of participatory workshops.

Over three days, in three locations, three performances unfolded simultaneously each evening. The audience navigated the city to visit each of the sites, thus utilising the urban landscape as staging. Utilising a multi-disciplinary approach, each specific site was transformed into a place of artistic encounter, creating an opportunity for workshop participants to develop and expand their artistic interest. The workshops was a place to meet a broad range of creative people and together share, think and expand upon our perceptions of the cityscape. Through our own stories, memories, and urban legends we explored the geographical and geopolitical movement of narrative through the streets of Beirut, illuminating a new relationship and perspective to the urban milieu. Triangulated City encouraged participants and spectators to view the city as an artistic canvas, with each specific location a place of dialogue and encounter.
