= Adel Osseiran =

Lebanese politician and statesman

- عادل عسيران
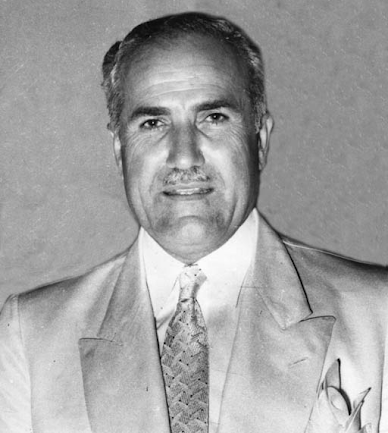
- Osseiran in 1960

4th Legislative Speaker of Lebanon
- In office 13 August 1953 – 20 October 1959
- Preceded by: Ahmed Assad
- Succeeded by: Sabri Hamadeh

Personal details
- Born: 5 June 1905 Sidon, Ottoman Empire
- Died: 18 June 1998 (aged 93) Sidon, Lebanon

Adel Osseiran (Note: His name is also transliterated Adil 'Usayran or Adil Osseyran) (Arabic: عادل عسيران; 5 June 1905 – 18 June 1998) was a Lebanese politician and statesman. A prominent political figure in Lebanon, he was a former Speaker of the Lebanese Parliament as well as one of the founding fathers of the Lebanese Republic.

Osseiran played a significant role at various points in the history of modern Lebanon, such as the struggle for independence (1943), the 1958 Lebanon crisis, and the Lausanne Conference for Peace (1984).

== Background and family life ==
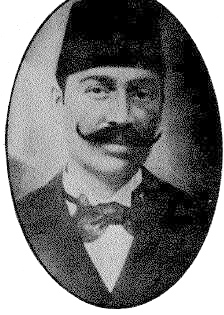
Adel's father Abdallah

The Osseiran family traces its Shia origins to what is now Iraq and there to the tribe of the Bani Asad, which fought alongside Husayn ibn Ali at Karbala in 680. After their defeat the survivors suffered persecution and after an unknown period of time one of the tribal members - Haidar - reportedly fled to Baalbek, where he had two sons: Ali and Osseiran. According to the family's historiography, the latter settled in Sidon/Saida. Historians have established that the Osseirans rose to prominence and power as grain merchants in Sidon and the Jabal Amel region of modern-day Southern Lebanon soon after the Ottoman Empire assumed control over the area in 1516:

"Having arrived some time in the sixteenth or seventeenth century and built up significant wealth from mercantile activities, they were eventually appointed consuls for Iran. As consuls they, and their employees, were exempt from Ottoman military service and were levied a lower tax on their goods. This allowed them to build their wealth more rapidly and to gather a greater supporter base in Saida and Zahrani (where they owned land) due to the privileges accorded their employees."

Born to Abdallah Ali Effendi Osseiran and Zahra Al Hajj Hassan Osseiran, Adel was his parents' only son.

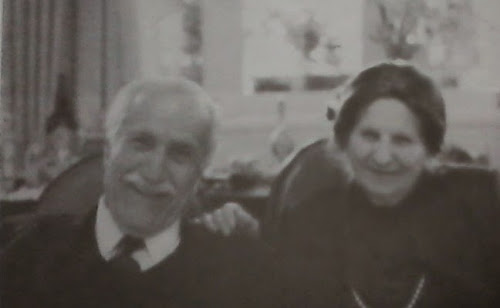
With his wife

Osseiran received his early education at the French Missionary Elementary School (Les Frères) operated by De La Salle Brothers in Sidon, and completed his secondary education at the International College (IC) in Beirut. He then pursued his higher studies at the American University of Beirut, graduating with a degree in History and Politics in 1928. He returned to his alma mater to do an MA in political science, graduating in 1936.

In 1936 he married Souad Al Hajj Ismail Al-Khalil, by whom he had seven children: Abdullah, Ali, and five daughters: Zhour, Afaf, Samia, Zeina, and Leila. Abdullah Osseiran was killed in Sidon on 22 December 1972. His daughter Leila married Iraqi politician Ahmed Chalabi in 1971; they had four children.

== Health problems ==
In later life Adel Osseiran developed serious health problems, not the least of which was his tremor. This hereditary disease made it difficult for him to pursue the activities of his daily life.

== Political career ==
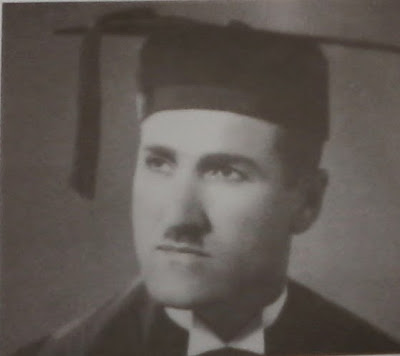
On his graduation day in 1936

Osseiran began his political career in 1936 right after his graduation when, alongside various dignitaries from Southern Lebanon (Jabal Amil), he began to campaign for the abolition of the tax that the French mandatory authorities were levying on agricultural land, particularly on tobacco farmers. After being arrested for making a fiery speech, he was taken to court and assigned a lawyer. However, he rejected all manner of legal counsel and undertook his own defense, turning it into a vigorous and spirited attack on the wrongdoings of the French mandatory authorities, as he saw them.

In the same year, he founded the Arab Youth Party which called for the unity of Lebanon's youth under the banner of modern education, civic service, and the strengthening of national unity. The party, however, eventually became non-operational due to lack of funding and other reasons.

In 1937 Osseiran ran for the Lebanese parliament for the first time. He lost the election.

In 1943 Osseiran was elected to the Lebanese parliament for the first time, a victory that proved to be the beginning of a long parliamentary career that ended only with his retirement from politics in 1992. He won every election after that with the exception of two (1951 and 1964).

In 1943 the new President Bechara El Khoury, PM Riad Al Solh, along with the rest of the cabinet of which Osseiran was a member, proceeded to abolish the articles of the constitution that tied Lebanon to the French Mandate. Upon their doing so the French High Commissioner had the President, the Prime Minister, and the Cabinet members arrested and imprisoned in the Citadel of Rashaya. After the public outcry that occurred, in addition to Anglo-American support, the French were compelled to release the cabinet members and recognize the independence of Lebanon.

== Milestones ==
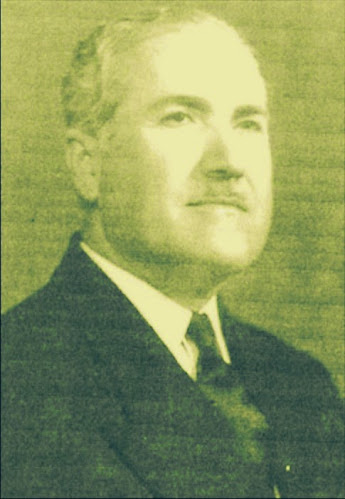
- (unknown date)
  In 1947 he was chosen to mediate a dispute between the Iranian and Saudi Arabian governments over the issue of Iranian pilgrims traveling to Mecca, thus restoring diplomatic relations between the two countries.
- In the same year he was chosen by the Lebanese government to be part of the delegation that traveled to New York to vote against the UN Partition of Palestine.
- In 1952 he took part in the Deir el Qamar conference, a gathering of Lebanese politicians that came together in opposition to the regime of President Bechara El Khoury, and which eventually led to the latter's downfall. In September 1952, Camille Chamoun was elected President of Lebanon, and the following year Osseiran was elected speaker of Parliament, with Ghassan Tueni as Deputy Speaker.
- In 1983 he participated in the Geneva Conference for Peace and Reconciliation in Lebanon.
- At the 1984 Lausanne Conference, he called for secularism, the abolition of the confessional political system, and endorsed armed resistance to the Israeli occupation of southern Lebanon.
- In 1989 he participated in the Tunisia conference convened by the Six Nation Arab State Commission for Peace in Lebanon.
- His last major political contribution came in 1989, when he participated in the Ta'ef Conference for National Dialogue in Saudi Arabia. The accord that resulted from this conference helped to end the Lebanese Civil War.

== Speaker of the Lebanese Parliament ==
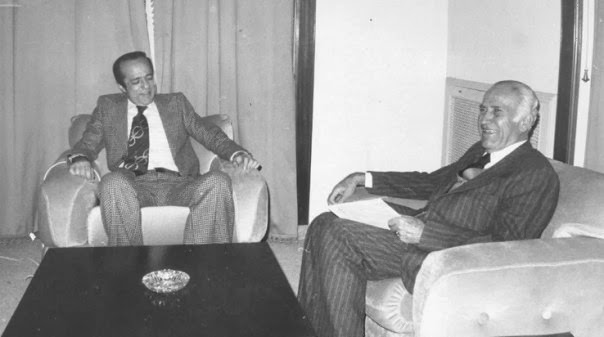
Osseiran (right) in 1968 with Kamel al-Asaad from a rival Shia dynasty, who like his father Ahmed al-Asaad before was also several times Speaker

Osseiran was voted Speaker of the Parliament of Lebanon on August 13, 1953, and held that post until October 15, 1959. During the mini-Civil War of 1958 he played a significant role in ending the riots and disturbances and securing the election of General Fouad Chehab as President of the Republic. He did so by calling Parliament into session to elect the new president, despite pressure not to do so from then President Camille Chamoun.

Earlier on, he had angered President Chamoun by vocally opposing the landing of the US Marines in Lebanon, and lodging a formal protest on the subject with the UN Secretary General in New York as well as with US President Dwight Eisenhower in Washington, DC.

Despite his early support for Fouad Chehab, Adel Osseiran later joined the ranks of the opposition, mainly due to Chehab's suppression of civil liberties and his fostering of a de facto police state.

== Minister in the Lebanese Government ==
Osseiran held several cabinet portfolios in the course of his political career.

He was minister of provisions, commerce and the economy between 1943 and 1945. He was minister of the interior in the government of Prime Minister Rashid Karami from November 1968 to September 1969. He was minister of justice in the period 1969-1970 and returned as minister of justice in the government of Rashid el Solh in October 1974 in which capacity he remained until 15 May 1975, by which time the Civil War had broken out. He held the ministries of justice, commerce and public works in Rashid Karami's six-man cabinet from 30 June 1975 until 9 December 1976 and after the amendment of 16 July 1976 he returned as minister of justice, education, tourism and urban planning.

He was also minister of both defense and agriculture in the cabinet of Rashid Karami, which lasted from 1984 until 1989 (from 1987 under Selim Al Huss following Karami's assassination).

== Legacy ==
He was, throughout his life, a firm believer in the value of education, seeing it as the way up the ladder for his underprivileged constituency in Southern Lebanon.

Before 1943 he was outspoken in his opposition to the French Mandate, while during the 1958 crisis he curtly demanded the removal of the US Marines from Lebanese soil.

Throughout the Lebanese Civil War he maintained the same stance, that the sectarian violence must come to an end and that there must be some kind of coexistence between all sects and groups in Lebanese society. Remaining in office and holding various Cabinet posts during the dark days of the war, he aligned himself with the Lebanese state.

Osseiran retired from politics in 1992 and retreated to his home near Sidon. He died on June 18, 1998.

The Adel Osseiran Street in Sidon bears his name.

== See also ==
- Sheikh Mohamad Osseiran
- Ayad Allawi

== Notes ==
Political offices
Preceded by Ahmed Alassad	Speaker of Parliament; 1953 - 1959	Succeeded by Sabri Hamadé
