= Batha, Lebanon =

Batha بطحا Batha'
- Municipality
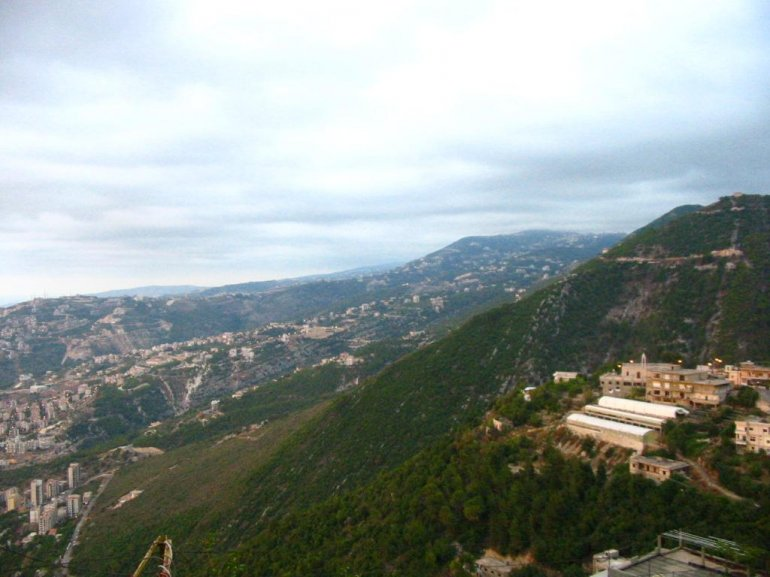
- General view of Batha

- Location in Lebanon
- Coordinates: 33°59′17″N 35°39′33″E
- Country: Lebanon
- Governorate: Keserwan-Jbeil
- District: Keserwan
- Time zone: UTC+02
- Area code: 09

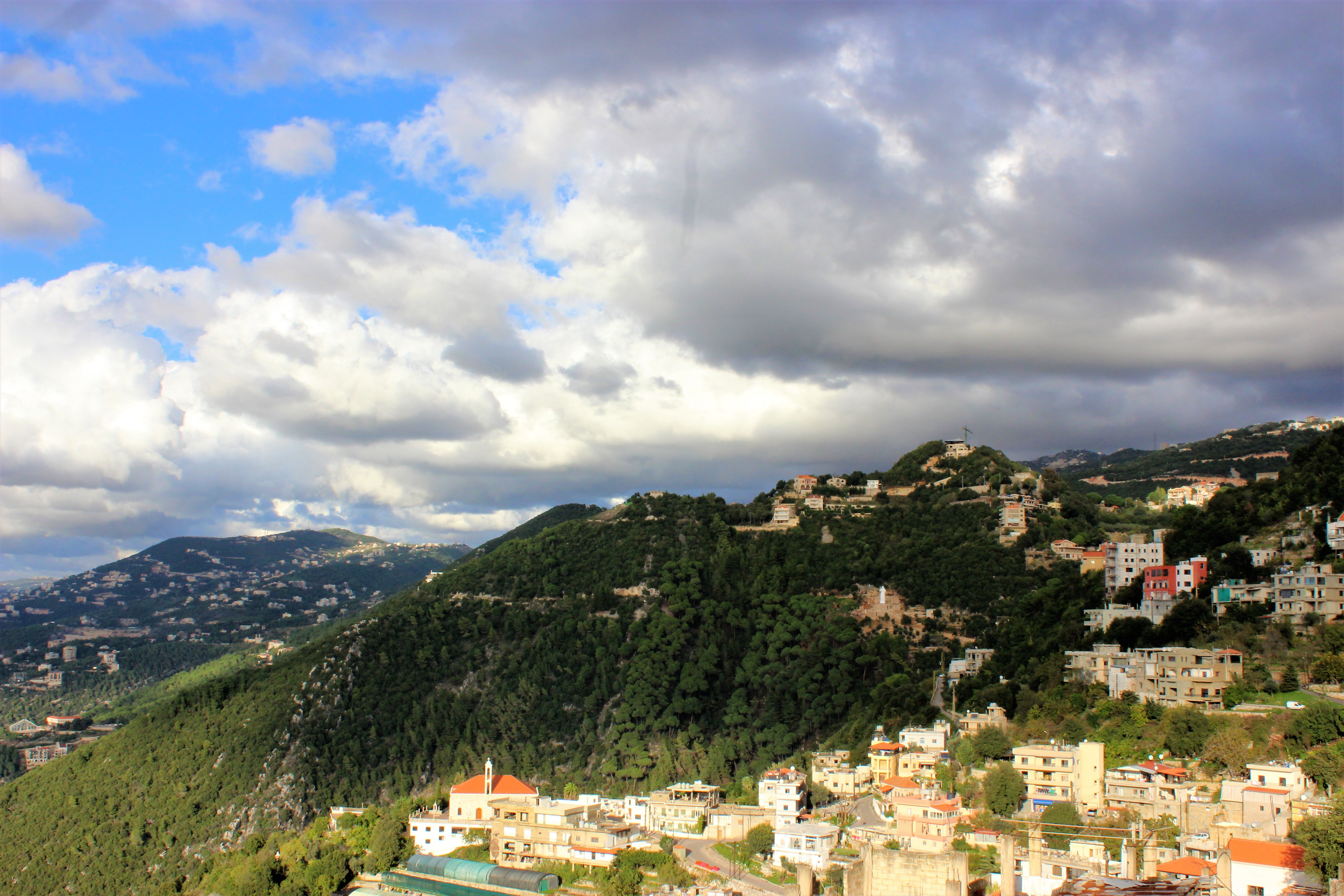

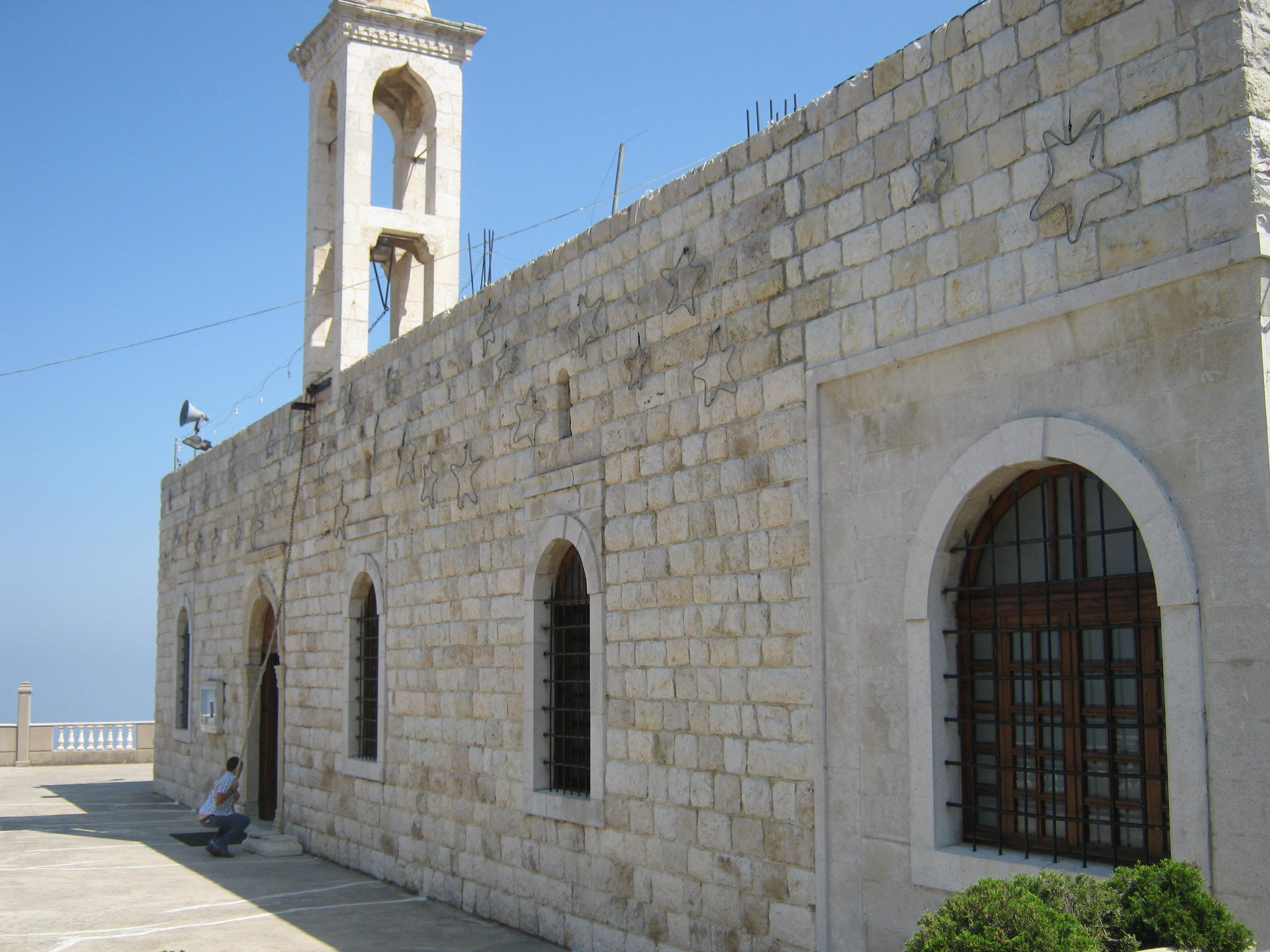
Church of Saint Nicholas in Batha

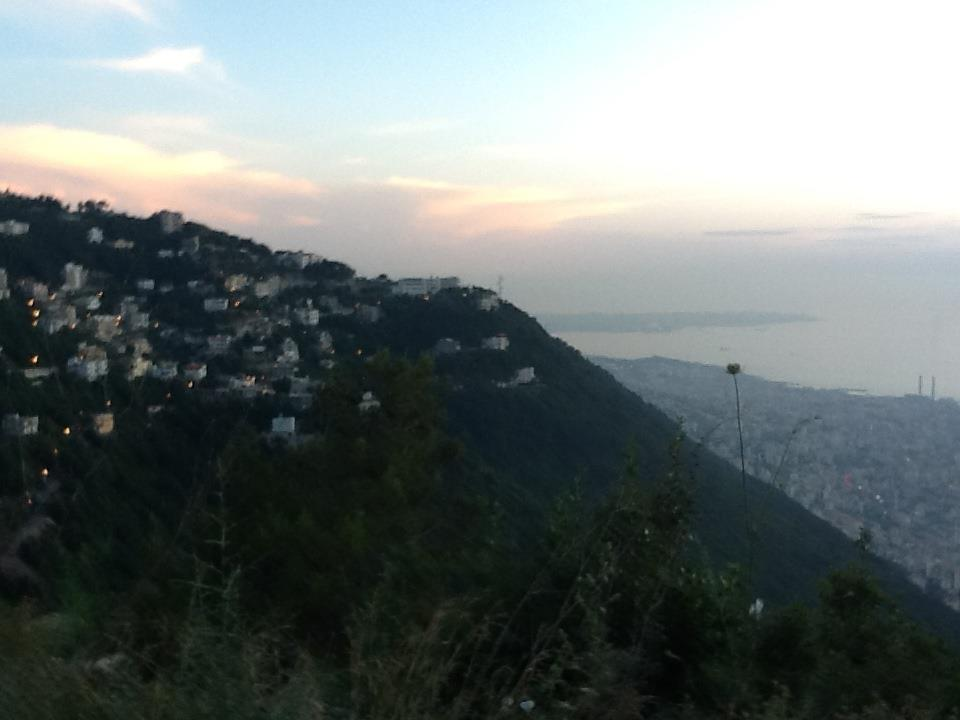
Batha as seen from Ghosta

Batha (Arabic: بطحا, romanized: Baṭḥā) is a village in the Keserwan District of the Keserwan-Jbeil Governorate of Lebanon. It is located 28 kilometers northern the Lebanese capital Beirut, and to the east of Jounieh Bay, with a view of the Mediterranean sea, with average elevation of 580 meters above sea level and total land area approximately 63 hectares. A water spring flows through the pine and oak tree forests to the north of Batha, watering gardens and orchards before emptying in the Mediterranean sea. Ottoman tax records indicate that Batha had 3 Christian households and 2 bachelors living there in 1543.

The inhabitants of the town are predominantly Maronite Catholics. Batha is the hometown of Lebanese painter Michel Elmir (1930–1973) and the hometown of the professor Nidal Elmir.
