= Kazem El-Solh =

Lebanese politician and diplomat (1904–1976)

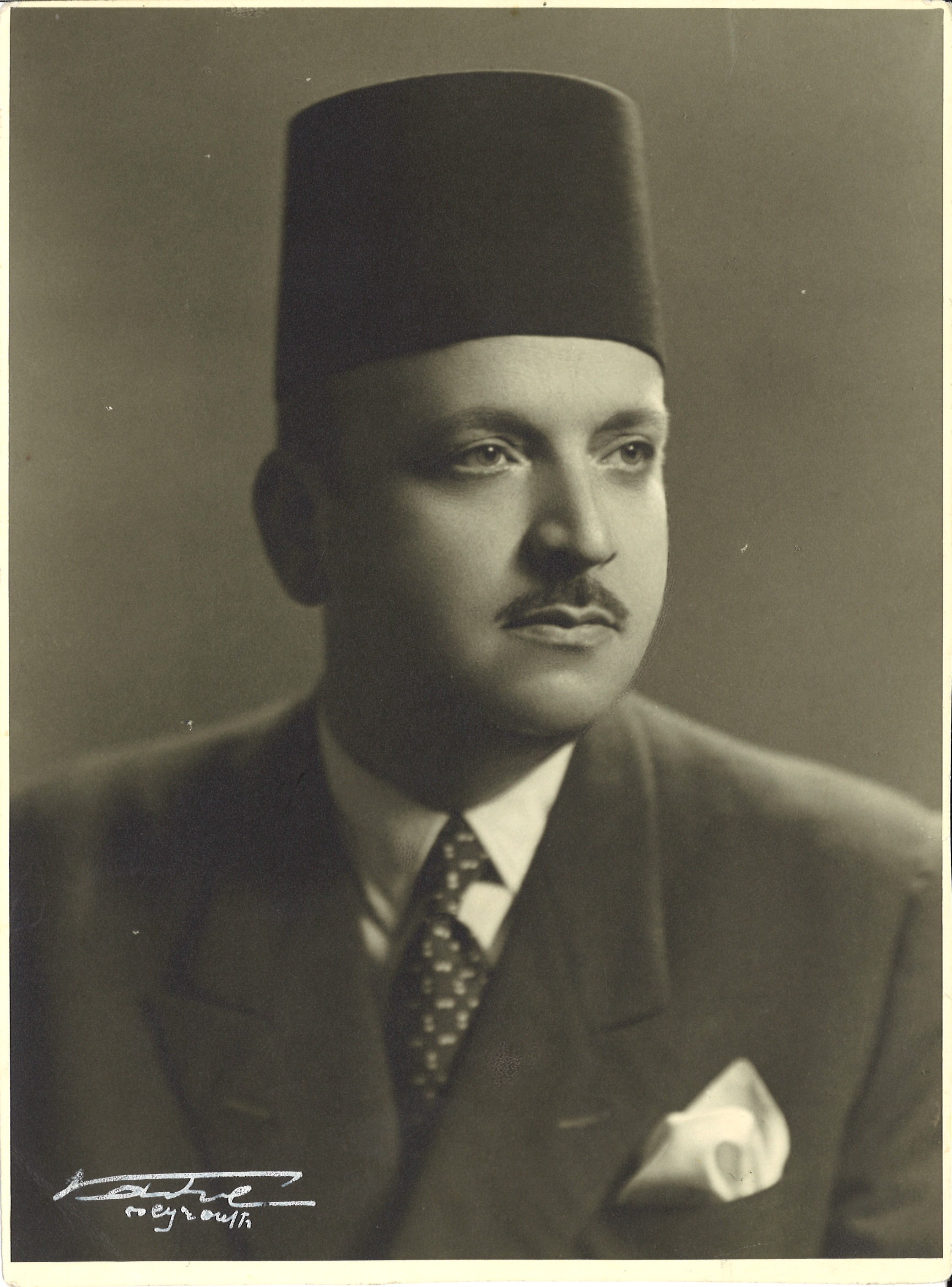
- Born: 1904; Beirut
- Died: 25 December 1976
- Education: University of Damascus
- Occupations: Political activist, politician, diplomat, newspaper founder
- Children: 4, including Raghid El-Solh
- Relatives: Takieddin el-Solh (brother)

Kazem El-Solh (1904 – 25 December 1976) was a Lebanese politician, a diplomat and the founder of a political party and a newspaper. He was a member of parliament in Lebanon and served as the country's ambassador to Iraq.

== Early life and education ==
He hails from a prominent Sunni Muslim family which gave Lebanon four prime ministers, his brother Takieddine Solh, as well as Riad Solh, Sami Solh and Rachid Solh. The Solh family is originally from the ancient port city of Sidon in southern Lebanon. Kazem El-Solh was born in 1904 in Beirut. He attended the International College, Beirut, then studied at the Jesuit School, also in Beirut, before graduating with a law degree from the University of Damascus.

== Career ==
Kazem El-Solh served as Lebanese Ambassador in Baghdad from 1947 to 1960, leaving Iraq a year after the coup ousting the Hashemite monarchy in the country. In 1960–1964, he was a member of the Lebanese Parliament, representing the eastern region of Zahle. He was also the head of the parliamentary foreign affairs committee.

Prior to that, Kazem El-Solh was a staunch activist for Arab nationalism and the region's independence from foreign powers. He also established the Arab Nationalist Party in 1935.

In 1936, El-Solh wrote a paper during the Coastal Conference, published later, and which was the precursor to Lebanon's National Pact, promoting Lebanese coexistence. His paper is generally considered as one of the foundations of the Lebanese Constitution and its citizen's charter.

In 1943–1947, he set up a law practice in downtown Beirut and in 1944-1960 he formed a political party called Al Nida, together with other intellectuals and his brother Takieddin el-Solh, who later became prime minister.

=== Al Nida ===
In 1930, he was the founding owner of the daily newspaper Al Nida (The Appeal) in Beirut, to which his brothers contributed articles. The paper ceased being published in 1940.

== Personal life and death ==
In 1934, he married his first cousin Yesser Kamel El-Solh. They had four children: Hannah, Khaldoun, Nawal and Raghid El-Solh. He died on 25 December 1976.
