= Raghid El-Solh =

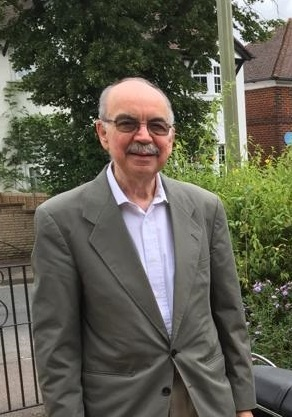
- Born: 7 July 1942; Beirut
- Died: 1 February 2017 (aged 74)
- Occupations: writer, researcher

Raghid Kazem El-Solh (7 July 1942 – 1 February 2017) was a Lebanese writer and researcher in international and Arab regional relations as well as democracy issues. He published several books about international relations, the Arab region and democracy. He was a regular contributor to several publications including the London-based pan-Arab Al-Hayat newspaper, and was a regular lecturer, political commentator and a consultant for the UN and other organizations.

Raghid was the son of Kazem El-Solh, a former member of Lebanese Parliament and a former Lebanese ambassador to Iraq. He hails from a prominent Sunni Muslim family which gave Lebanon four prime ministers: Riad Solh, Sami Solh, Takieddine Solh and Rachid Solh.

== Career ==
Raghid Kazem El-Solh earned a B.A. in political science from the American University of Beirut (1964), a M.Sc. in political science from the School of Oriental & African Studies at the University of London (1978) and a PhD in politics and international relations from St. Antony's College, Faculty of Social Science, at the University of Oxford (1986).

He is the author of several books including: Peaceful Settlement and Arab Unity (1980), Lebanon on the Road to the Future (1979), Oman and the South-Eastern Shore of Arabia (Archive documents on the history of the Arab world series) (1997), The Sultanate of Oman 1939-1945 (2000), The Sultanate of Oman 1914-1918 (2000), The Sultanate of Oman 1918-1939: Part I (2000), The Sultanate of Oman 1918-1939: Part II (2000), The Sultanate of Oman 1918-1939: Part III (2000), The Sultanate of Oman 1945 Onwards (2000), Britain's Two Wars with Iraq (2003), and Lebanon and Arabism, 1936-1945 (2004).

He was a visiting fellow at the Institute for Middle Eastern and Islamic Studies at the University of Durham, U.K.

He did consultancy work for the UN and other organizations covering Arab regional affairs, democracy, governance, justice, and human rights.

== Personal life ==
Raghid El-Solh was born on July 7, 1942, in Beirut. He was the son of Kazem El-Solh and Yesser Kamel El-Solh.

Raghid was married to Camillia Fawzi, an Egyptian/Irish socio-economist independent consultant, who died 18 months after him on August 29, 2018. They have a daughter Lina and two grandchildren Harry and Lily.

He was the brother of Hannah, Khaldoun and Nawal El-Solh.

Raghid died at the age of 74 on February 1, 2017, in Oxford, U.K. He was buried in Beirut, following a memorial at St Antony's College, Oxford.

== Legacy ==
The Raghid Kazem El-Solh Travel Grant was established after he died to help PhD students registered at the University of Oxford in their research across member states of the League of Arab States, focusing on democracy and governance, justice and human rights, regionalism and parliamentary processes, and other relevant subjects in the politics and international relations of the Arab world.
