= El Khazen family =

Lebanese family and clan

El-Khazen family الخازن
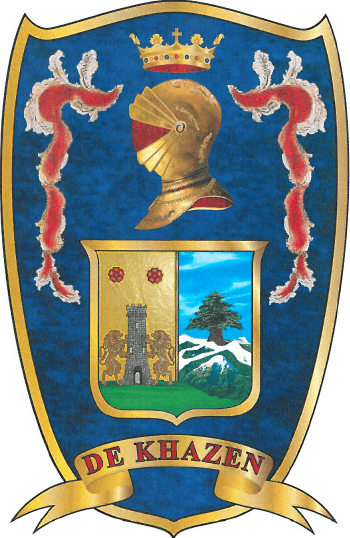
- El Khazen family crest
- Country: Mount Lebanon, Ottoman Empire
- Current region: Lebanon; Syria; Palestine
- Seat: Keserwan, Lebanon
- Titles: Patriarch of Antioch; Bishop; Count palatine
- Members: Tobias El Khazen; Joseph Dergham El Khazen; Joseph Ragi El Khazen; Philippe El Khazen
- Traditions: Maronite Christian

El-Khazen (also Al-Khazen, Khazen, Khazin or De Khazen; Arabic: آل الخازن) is a prominent Maronite Levantine family and clan based in Keserwan District, Lebanon, Damascus, Syria, Nablus, Palestine, as well as other districts around the Levant, predominantly in the Galilee in Israel.

The family were very influential within the Maronite Church. Several members have played leading roles in the politics of Lebanon for many generations. King Louis XIV elevated the family to the French nobility and referred to them as "princes of the Maronites" in many letters. Pope Clement X made them Counts Palatine. Most of the Lebanese Khazen branch is Maronite, while some other branches are Greek Orthodox and Muslim but are not related to the Mount-Lebanese, which were endowed with these honors.

== History ==
The Khazen Cheikhs can trace back their lineage to the 9th century to the Ghassanids, when they were mainly located between Houran, Damascus, Baalbeck, and Nablus. They started buying and acquiring lands in Mount Lebanon during the 15th century and, more specifically, first in Jaj (currently in Byblos District). They continued their exodus to the Keserwan district, where they bought lands from the Shi'a tribes. This caused the Shi'a to move towards what is known today as the South of Lebanon and the Maronites to the Keserwan district.

In 1584, the Khazen were able to hide the princes Fakhreddine and Younès in Ballouneh. At that time, their father, cornered by the Ottoman's army and losing the fight against them, informed his wife Sitt Nossab to send his sons to the Khazen, a powerful and influential family at that time. The great Fakhreddine, when he took power, was greatly influenced by the Khazen family politically and religiously. In return, he granted them the title of Cheikh and complete political influence and control of Mount Lebanon. Similarly, the Khazen also gave shelter to Prince Haidar Shehab's sons, in Keserwan in the early 18th century.

The Khazen families, who were now controlling the Keserwan district, were very influential within the Maronite Church. This is due to their financial support of the Church and their assistance in its expansion by the construction of many monasteries, several of which they still own today, as well as their connections to the French. They also offered lands and, most importantly, supplied security to the Church and the Maronite community overall. In 1656, Cheikh Abou Nawfal received a Papal decoration for his help in the expansion of the Maronite faith in Mount Lebanon. The family was consulted on each patriarchal election and controlled episcopal nominations for three Maronite archbishoprics—representing the districts of Aleppo, Baalbeck, and Damascus—until the 19th century. There were three important and influential patriarchs from the Khazen family: Youssef Dargham (1733–1742), Toubia (1756–1766) and Youssef Ragi (1845–1854). Several bishops have also shared the name, including Michel (Caesarea, 1767–1786), Ignace (Nablus, 1787–1819), Germanos (Damascus, 1794–1806), Estefan (Damascus, 1806–1830), Anton (Baalbeck, 1807–1858), Estefan (Damascus, 1848–1868), Louis Joseph (Ptolemais, 1919–1933), and Georges Abou (Rusadus, 2014-current).

In 1858, Tanios Chahine started a rebellion against the Khazen family, which caused a great loss to their dominance over Kerserwan. The rebellion was a result of a power struggle between the Abillama family, the English, the French, the Ottomans, and particular Khazen who wanted to increase their influence. After these events, the Khazen stayed involved in politics, yet their work as one family holding ultimate Maronite power has diminished greatly.

The Khazen crest which includes a snowy part of the mountain and cedar trees, reflects the family's special closeness to the country, and especially to Mount Lebanon.

There are multiple branches of the family. The two main branches are based in Ajaltoun, which mainly traces its origins from Nawfal Abou Nassif el-Khazen (son of Nader Abou Nawfal el-Khazen), and Ghosta, which mainly traces its origins from Fayad Abou Kanso el-Khazen (son of Nader Abou Nawfal; also, consul of France). Kfardebian, which is nearby, also has a sizable branch as well as Achqout and Jounieh.

== Today ==
In modern times, Khazen have always represented Keserwan with at least one deputy in the Lebanese Parliament. They have also been represented in many recent governments. Prominent politicians include Cheikh Philippe El Khazen, a prominent doctor and medical professor born in 1921 in Ghosta. Cheikh Philippe El Khazen was a member of the Parliament in 1968-1972 and a co-founder and Vice President of the Maronite League. He was also a member of the European Christian Democratic Party.

Cheikh Antanios Elias El Khazen from Ballouneh, owner of Kstars Cosmetics international cosmetics brand, was born in 1959.

Cheikh Elias Choukrallah El Khazen, minister and deputy born in 1927 from Ajaltoun, was a member of Parliament in 1964, 1972, 1992, 1996 and Minister of Interior from 1989 - 1990. Cheikh Elias Choukrallah El Khazen as a deputy signed the Taef agreement to end the Lebanese civil war and to return to political normalcy in Lebanon.

Cheikh Wadih El Khazen, minister of Tourism, Feb 2005, and president of The Central Maronite Council since January 2006. Walid el-Khazen, former ambassador from the Sovereign Military Order of Malta to Jordan, Amine el-Khazen, former Lebanese ambassador to the United Nations, Farid Haykal el-Khazen, former Tourism Minister, and Farid Elias el-Khazen, professor and past Chairman of Political Studies at the American University of Beirut and current MP. Noteworthy businessmen include Fady el-Khazen, former director for the Ministry of Agriculture and owner of French restaurant La Creperie, Chafic el-Khazen, the CEO of Sky Management, Fouad el-Khazen, honorary chairman of the BIT bank, and Ghassan El Khazen, owner of Edarat Group and De Khazen

Abraham Kazen, a relative of the family, represented Texas's 23rd congressional district in the United States Congress from 1967 to 1985.

== See also ==
- List of political families in Lebanon
