= 1968 Lebanese general election in Batroun District =

Voting to elect two members of the Lebanese parliament took place in the Batroun District in northern Lebanon in 1968, part of the national general election of that year. Both of the seats of the constituency were earmarked for the Maronite community (for more information about the Lebanese election system, see Elections in Lebanon). Batroun District had 24,331 eligible voters, out of whom 9,458 voted. It had the lowest number of eligible as well as actual voters of all constituencies in the country. Seven candidates contested the election. The constituency witnessed a clash of both organized political parties as well as family interests.

== Candidates ==
=== Harb-Aql ticket ===
John Harb of the National Liberal Party and Sayid Aql of the Lebanese National Bloc contested on a joint ticket. The veteran politician Harb was an incumbent parliamentarian since 1953, whilst his younger running mate Aql was a newcomer to electoral politics. Hailing from a prominent family of the area, Aql was a landowner and a painter.

=== Daw-Sa'adah ticket ===
A second ticket in the fray was formed by Joseph Daw, a lawyer by profession and former candidate in parliamentary elections, and George Sa'adah, a member of the Kataeb Party. Apart from holding doctorates in Law and Political Science, Sa'adah served as the Director-General of the Ministry of Education.

=== Other candidates ===
Three candidates ran on individual tickets.

== Results ==
Sayid Aql and George Sa'adah were elected, routing the incumbent Cheikh Jean Harb.

Candidate	Votes
George Sa'adah	8,073
Sayid Aql	7,293
Jean Harb	7,146
Yusuf Daw	6,611
Amin al-Khuri	1,517
