= Philippe El Khazen =

Lebanese politician

- فيليب حنا الخازن
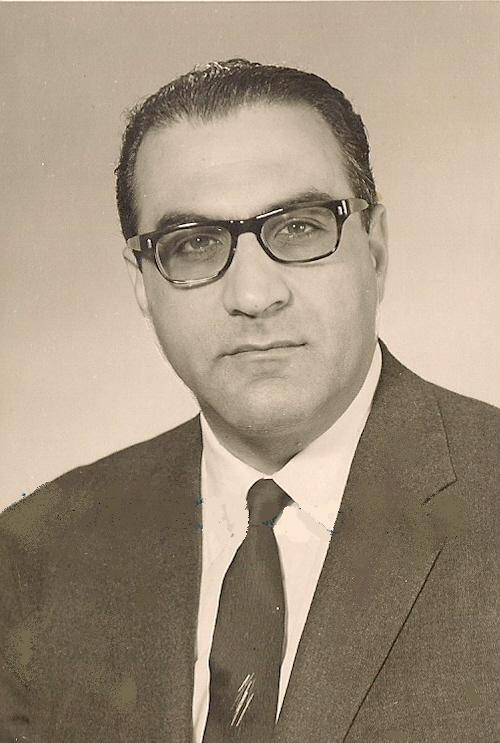
- Born: June 12, 1921; Beirut
- Died: March 6, 1996 (aged 74); Jounieh
- Occupations: Politician, doctor

Philippe Hanna El Khazen (Arabic: فيليب حنا الخازن; June 12, 1921 - March 6, 1996) was a Lebanese associate professor of medicine and politician from the village of Ghosta in the district of Keserwen. He was elected parliament deputy in the Keserwen region from 1968 to 1972 under the presidency of Charles Hélou. Recipient of the Legion of Honor as officer awarded by President Giscard D'Estaing and was also named Knight of the Order of the Cedar.

== Early life ==
El Khazen was born on June 12, 1921, in the town of Ghosta into a Lebanese Christian family, of seigneurial origin under the title of Grand Sheikh. He is the son of Physician Doctor Hanna El Khazen, and Princess Samia Chehab, daughter of Emir Malek Chehab, and has two brothers, Malek and Farid.

=== Education ===
A laureate student of the Jesuits of Beirut, he began medical studies at Saint-Joseph University in Beirut where he obtained his doctorate in 1945. He specialized in France in 1946 where he returned with an associate degree in medical pathology, a subject he taught. then in Beirut before becoming chief physician of the Geitaoui Hospital, founded by his father in 1927. He ran the hospital for many years and contributed to its renovation. He chaired the Hospital's Medical Committee before becoming Chairman of the Board of Directors from 1952 to 1987.

== Political career ==
El Khazen was elected deputy of the Lebanese parliament in October 1968 on the list of the Tripartite Alliance, which includes the main Christian parties, with 18,200 votes in Keserwen against the list aligning itself with the policy of former president Fouad Chéhab, also known as Chehbism. In 1969, he co-founded the Maronite League and became its vice-president. This organization works to maintain links between Maronite emigrants and their country of origin. He joined the International Association of Parliamentarians of La Francophonie in 1970, and took part in meetings alongside former President Charles Hélou.

== Personal life ==
El Khazen married Renée Camille Akl in 1951. Daughter of an emigrant businessman and former member of parliament, she pioneered in landscape architecture in Lebanon towards the end of the 1960s, including projects carried out internationally, particularly in Latin America, Europe and the Middle East and chaired the Lebanese Red Cross in 1969 and initiated the rehabilitation in the city of Jounieh. They have two children, Jean-Philippe and Neda.
