= Ali Osseiran =

Lebanese politician

Member of the Lebanese Parliament

Minister of State
- In office 31 October 1992 – 25 May 1995
- Prime Minister: Rafik Hariri

Personal details
- Born: Ali Adel Osseiran
- Party: Amal Movement

Ali Osseiran (Arabic: علي عسيران) is a former Lebanese government minister and a member of the Parliament of Lebanon who represented the Zahrani district of South Lebanon. He is the son of Lebanese politician Adel Osseiran. Osseiran served as the minister of state in the first cabinet of Rafik Hariri between 31 October 1992 and 25 May 1995.

== See also ==
- Sheikh Mohamad Osseiran
