= Ghosta, Lebanon =

Ghosta غوسطا
- Municipality
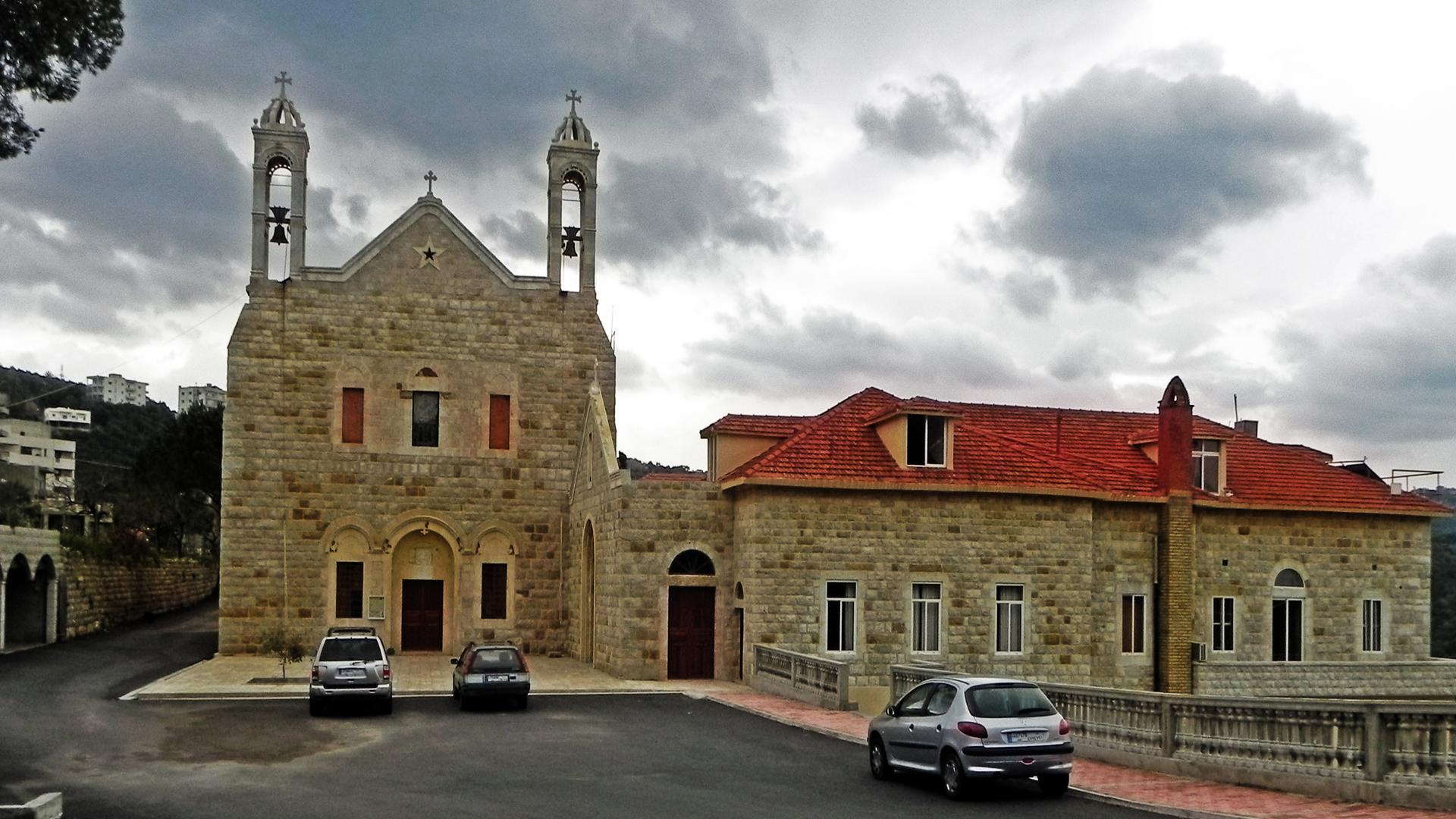
- Ghosta Monastery and Church, Lebanon

- Location in Lebanon
- Coordinates: 33°59′28″N 35°40′25″E
- Country: Lebanon
- Governorate: Keserwan-Jbeil
- District: Keserwan

Area
  - Total: 4.61 km^{2} (1.78 sq mi)
- Elevation: 950 m (3,120 ft)
- Time zone: UTC+2 (EET)
  - Summer (DST): UTC+3 (EEST)
- Area code: 09

Ghosta (Arabic: غوسطا, romanized: Ghūsṭā) is a municipality in the Keserwan District of the Keserwan-Jbeil Governorate of Lebanon. It is located 36 kilometers north of Beirut. Ghosta's average elevation is 950 meters above sea level and its total land area is 461 hectares. Its inhabitants are predominantly Maronite Catholics.

== History ==
Ottoman tax records indicate Ghosta had 11 Christian households in 1523, 12 Christian households and one bachelor in 1530, and 15 Christian households and one bachelor in 1543.

The qass Jirjis Khayr Allah Istifān founded in 1660 the monastery of 'Ayn Warqa with the support of the Khazen sheiks. The monastery was transformed in a college according to the model of the Maronite College in Rome in the late eighteenth century.

In 1838, Eli Smith noted Ghusta as a village located in Aklim el-Kesrawan, Northeast of Beirut; the chief seat of the Maronites.

Ghosta has three schools, two private and one public, with a total of 772 students as of 2008. As of 2008, there were eleven companies with at least five employees operating in the village. It is home to the Congregation of Maronite Lebanese Missionaries and its main monastery, and the birthplace of Lebanese pioneer painter, Daoud Corm (1852 – 1930) and of pioneer Lebanese journalist, Philippe Ziade (1909–2005).

== See also ==
- Batha, Lebanon
- List of cities and towns in Lebanon
- List of municipalities of Lebanon

== Bibliography ==
- Bakhit, Muhammad Adnan Salamah (February 1972). The Ottoman Province of Damascus in the Sixteenth Century (PhD). School of Oriental and African Studies, University of London.
- Leeuwen, Richard Van (1994). Notables and Clergy in Mount Lebanon: The Khāzin Sheikhs and the Maronite Church, 1736-1840. BRILL. ISBN 978-90-04-09978-4.
- Robinson, E.; Smith, E. (1841). Biblical Researches in Palestine, Mount Sinai and Arabia Petraea: A Journal of Travels in the year 1838. Vol. 3. Boston: Crocker & Brewster.
