= Ain Aanoub =

Ain Aanoub عين عنوب `Ayn `A `Nube
- Town
- Location in Lebanon
- Coordinates: 33°47′0″N 35°32′0″E
- Country: Lebanon
- Governorate: Mount Lebanon Governorate
- District: Aley District
- Time zone: UTC+2 (EET)
  - Summer (DST): +3
- Dialing code: +961

Ain Aanoub (Arabic: عين عنوب, romanized: ʿAyn ʿAnūb) is a small, village in Aley District in the Mount Lebanon Governorate of Lebanon, 350m above sea level.
