= Mohamad Osseiran =

Muslim Lebanese cleric

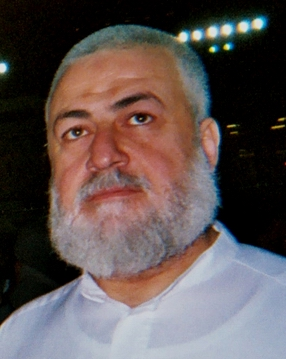
- Sheikh Mohamad Osseiran
- Title: Mufti

Personal life
- Born: Saida, Lebanon
- Other name: Arabic: الشيخ محمد عسيران

Religious life
- Religion: Twelver islam

Senior posting
- Based in: Saida, Lebanon
- Post: Mufti

Sheikh Mohamad Osseiran (Arabic: الشيخ محمد عسيران) is the Jaafari mufti of Saida and Zahrani districts of South Lebanon, Lebanon. Osseiran is a Muslim Lebanese cleric who engages in interfaith dialogue.
