= Lebanese Social Democratic Party =

Democratic Socialist Party Lebanon حزب الدمقراطي الإشتراكي
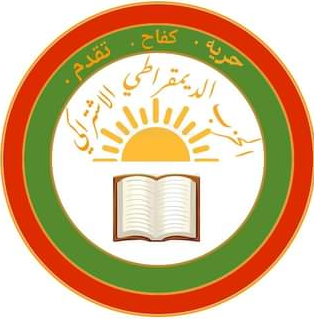
- New Democratic Socialist Party of Lebanon Logo as of 2021
- Abbreviation: DSPL
- President: Lina Saad (El Assaad) (Acting President)
- Founder: Kamel Asaad
- Founded: June 1970
- Headquarters: Tayibe, Lebanon
- Ideology: Secularism; Lebanese nationalism Left-wing nationalism Islamic socialism Social democracy Democratic socialism Red Shi'ism
- Colours: Green; Red; White
- Slogan: "Freedom. Struggle. Advancement."
- Military wing: El-Assaad Clan Military (1970–1982)
- Parliament of Lebanon: 0 / 128
- Cabinet of Lebanon: 0 / 20

The Lebanese Social Democratic Party (Arabic: الحزب الديمقراطي الاشتراكي Hizb Al-Dimoqraty Al-Ishtiraki) is a party founded and led by former Lebanese speaker of parliament Kamel Bek El-Assaad. The party was founded in June 1970.

== Names ==
The Lebanese Social Democratic Party is also known as Socialist Democratic Party or Democratic Social Party and Parti social-démocrate libanais in French and (Arabic: الحزب الديمقراطي الاشتراكي).

== Ideology ==
- The Social Democratic Party was officially declared secular. However, the majority of its supporters are of Muslim faith.
- The promotion of modern-shiasm, Islamized socialism and lastly, democracy.
- An Independent Lebanon with full sovereignty and unity.
- Promotes arab nationalism in Lebanon, while appreciating the Phoenician history and origin.
- Believes in brotherhood towards neighboring arab countries.
- Appreciates the coexistence of all religions and their sects in Lebanon.
- The government should serve the people, not the other way around.
- The country should remain under one military power, and all parties must disarm.

== Kamel Bek El-Assaad ==
Kamel Bek served starting early 1960 as Deputy (Member of the Lebanese Parliament) of Bint Jbeil, succeeding his father late Ahmed Asaad and then held the parliamentary seat of Hasbaya-Marjayoun from 1964 and 1992. He was elected Speaker of the Lebanese Parliament several times, May to October 1964, May to October 1968, with his final stint from 1970 to 1984. Assaad chaired the parliamentary sessions, which saw the election of presidents Elias Sarkis, Bachir Gemayel, and Amine Gemayel.

Assaad left politics in 1984 after Syria's intervention in Lebanon's internal political policies related to the ratification of the Agreement of May 17, 1984, between Israel and Lebanon, and the period of political crisis which followed.

He also had ministerial positions in two Lebanese governments serving as Minister of Education and Fine Arts from October 1961 to February 1964, and as Minister of Health and Minister of Water and Electricity Resources from April to December 1966.

After serving as a Member of Parliament and its Speaker several times, Assaad later ran for public office but failed to get elected in the Lebanese elections in 1992, 1996 and 2000, in the face of pro-Syrian and pro-Iranian political groups Amal and Hezbollah lists, and called for a boycott of the elections in 2005. He died in 2010, at the age of 78.

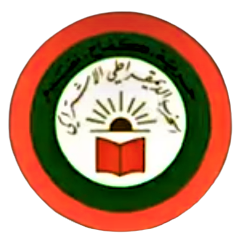
The Old Social Democratic Party Shield & Flag

== Relations ==
The party is hostile to Hezbollah and Amal movement, and most of their supporters are from the Lebanese Shi'a community, specifically those loyal to the House of El-Assaad. The party was neutral with most parties, and was in good relation with President Bashir Gemayel leader of the Lebanese Kateab Party.

== Conflict ==
After the Death of Kamel Bek El-Assaad, Lina Saad, his second wife, took leadership of the party. This led to conflict, then his first wife Ghada Al-Kharsa and her son, Ahmed El-Assaad, started their own party; The Lebanese Option Party. Many believe that the Lebanese Option Party does not represent the El-Assaad Family or the Lebanese Social Democratic Party in any way.

== Current status ==
The party does not have any members in parliament. It still attends and hosts charities, gatherings and political meetings. However, it still waits for a new leader from the El-Assaad Family. It is expected that one of Kamel Bek El Assaad's sons from his second wife, will have leadership eventually. Currently, Lina Saad is in-charge of the party and proceeds to handle all its internal and external relations.

== See also ==
- Political parties in Lebanon
- El Assaad Family
- Lebanese Shia Muslims
- May 17 Agreement
- Legislative Speaker of Lebanon
- 1968 Lebanese general election in Marjeyoun-Hasbaya
- Kamel El Assaad
- List of legislative speakers of Lebanon
- Ahmed El Assaad
- Tebnine
