= El Assaad family =

Lebanese Shia dynasty/political clan

El Assaad الأسعد
- Emirs (Princes) of Belad Bechara and Bakaweit of South Lebanon
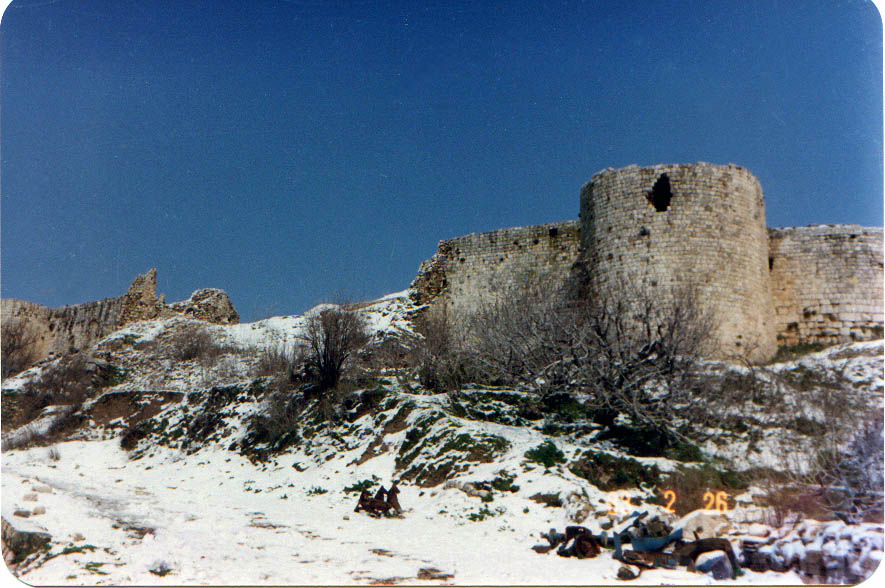
- El Assaad Headquarters in Tibnin, 1749–1893
- Country: Jabal Amil, Lebanon
- Origin: Najd
- Founded: 1706
- Founder: Ali Al-Saghir; Nasif al-Nassar
- Final ruler: Kamil Bey El Assaad (El-Esat)
- Titles: Emir of Belad Bechara (Previously); Bek or Bey

El-Assaad or Al As'ad (Arabic: الأسعد) is an Arab feudal political family who originated from Najd and is a main branch of the Anizah tribe. Unrelated to Syrian or Palestinian al-Assads, the El-Assaad dynasty that ruled most of South Lebanon for three centuries and whose lineage defended the local people of the Jabal Amel (Mount Amel) principality – today southern Lebanon – for 36 generations, they also held influence in Balqa in Jordan, Nablus in Palestine, and Homs in Syria during Ottomans rule.

Key figures in their history include Sheikh al Mashayekh (Chief of Chiefs) Nasif al-Nassar ibn al-Waeli, who governed during the Arab caliphate, and Sabib Pasha El-Assaad, who navigated Ottoman conquests. Ali Bek El-Assaad ruled over Belad Bechara, a part of Jabal Amel, while Ali Nassrat Bek served as an Advisor of the Court and held a superior position in the Ottoman Empire's Ministry of Foreign Affairs. Moustafa Nassar Bek El-Assaad served as the Supreme Court President of Lebanon during the colonial French administration, and Hassib Bek, also a supreme court Judge, played a significant role in legal proceedings across the Levant.

The patriarchy originated when Bedouin Ali al-Saghir ("al-Saghir" translates to "the Small" or "the Little") travelled from the Najd. They were proclaimed as El-Assaad (the Most Rejoiceful) by their adopting people of Jabal Amel after liberating Sidon and Tyre, its ancient and biblical capitals from Byzantine tyrants. Ali's tribe, the Anazzah (of Bani Wael) also the tribe of al-Saud royalty, travelled northwest in search of arable farmland.

During the El-Assaad era, provincial governors operated with the consent of local clans. In exchange for their protection and support of trade against external threats, these governors were granted Khuwwa, a voluntary crop-sharing system. This arrangement ensured the preservation for the freedom of individuals against imperial taxation regimes. However, as domestic ideological conflicts, foreign interventions, and corruption escalated, the El-Assaad regime struggled to maintain its control, leading to a rapid deterioration of stability and governance.

El-Assaads are now considered "Bakaweit" (title of nobility plural of "Bek" granted to a few wealthy families in Lebanon in the early 18th century), and are considered princes or heirs to the family's dynasty to some.

== Family background ==
The Shia feudal dynasty, which originally hailed from Najd, was established by Ali al-Saghir in the 17th century after the execution of the Druze leader Fakhreddine II by the Ottoman leadership. The El-Assaad-clan of the Ali al-Saghir-family went on to dominate the area of Jabal Amel (modern-day Southern Lebanon) for almost three centuries, with their base originally in Tayibe, Marjeyoun District.

When the 1858 Ottoman Land reforms led to the accumulated ownership of large tracts of land by a few families upon the expense of the peasants, the El-Assaad descendants of the rural Ali al-Saghir dynasty expanded their fief holdings as the provincial leaders in Jabal Amel.

During the French colonial ruler over Greater Lebanon (1920–1943) the mandatory regime gave Shiite feudal families like El-Assaad

"a free hand in enlarging their personal fortunes and reinforcing their clannish powers."

== Ali al-Saghir dynasty ==
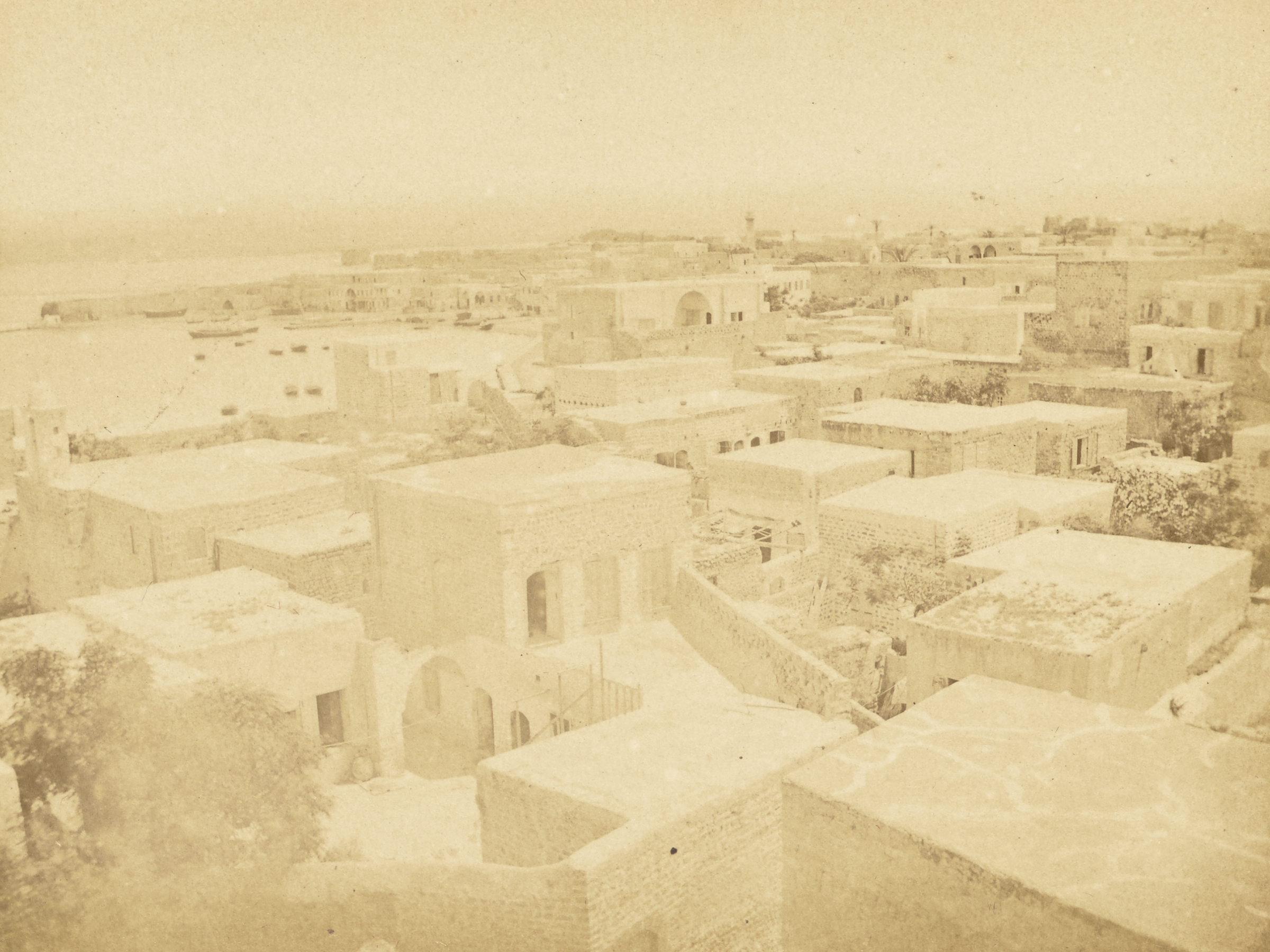
"Tyr, PALESTINE" – Albumen silver print by Félix Bonfils around 1878

Ali al-Saghir – a leader of the discriminated Metwali, the Shia Muslims of what is now Lebanon – established a dynasty that dominated the area of Jabal Amel for almost three centuries until the mid-twentieth century. The scions of its El-Assaad clan have continued to play a political role even into the 21st century, though of lately a rather peripheral one. Around 1750, Jabal Amel's ruler from the Shiite dynasty of Ali al-Saghir, Sheikh Nasif al-Nassar, initiated a number of construction projects to attract new inhabitants to the almost deserted town. His representative in Tyre was the "tax-farmer and effective governor" Sheikh Kaplan Hasan. The main trade partners became French merchants, though both Hasan and al-Nassar at times clashed with French authorities about the conditions of the commerce.

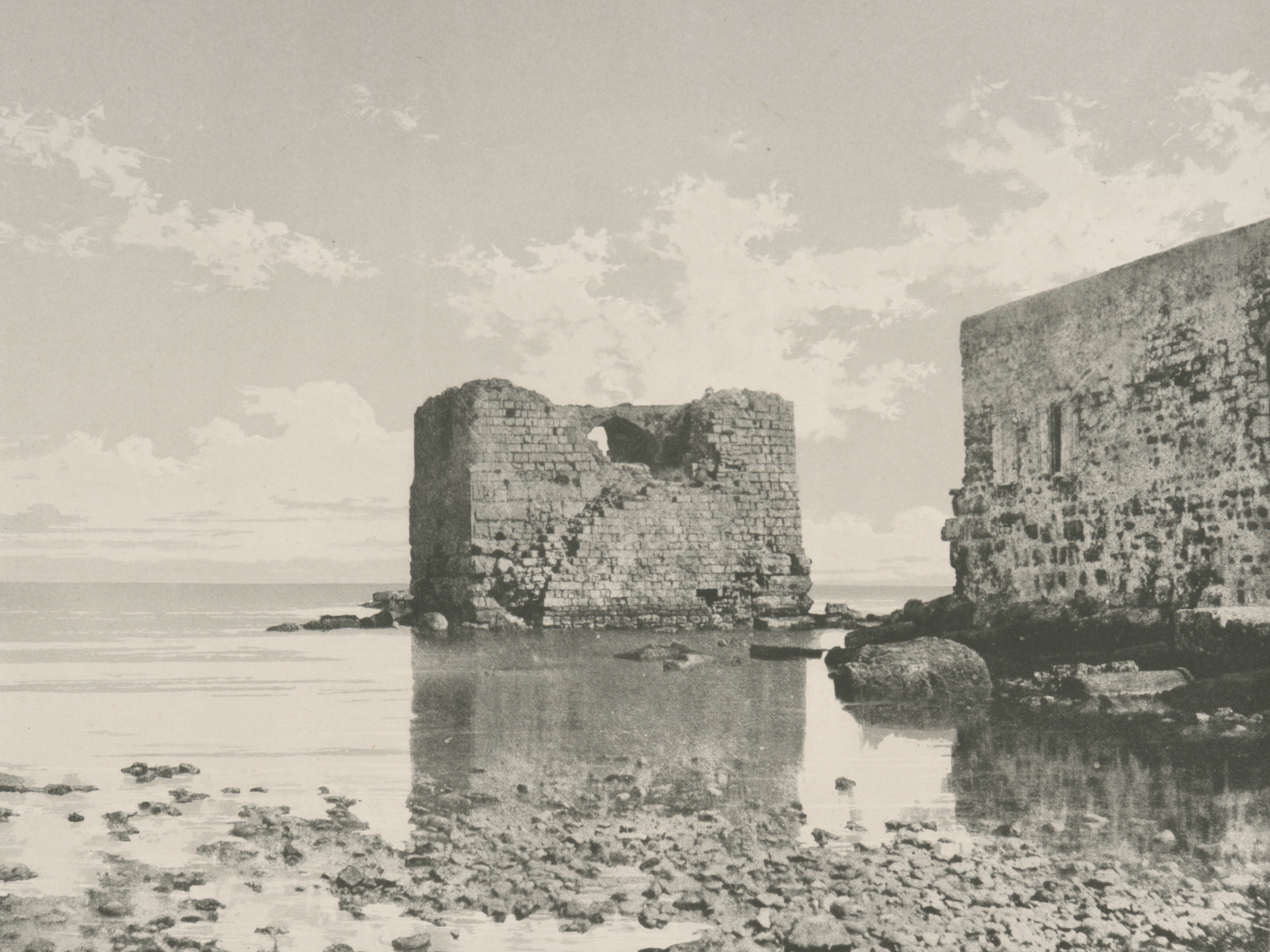
Tyre, ruins of a military tower (1874).

Amongst al-Nassar's projects was a marketplace. While the former Maani palace was turned into a military garrison, al-Nassar commissioned the Serail at the Northern port as his own headquarters, which nowadays houses the police HQ. The military Al Mobarakee Tower from the al-Nassar era is still well-preserved, too.

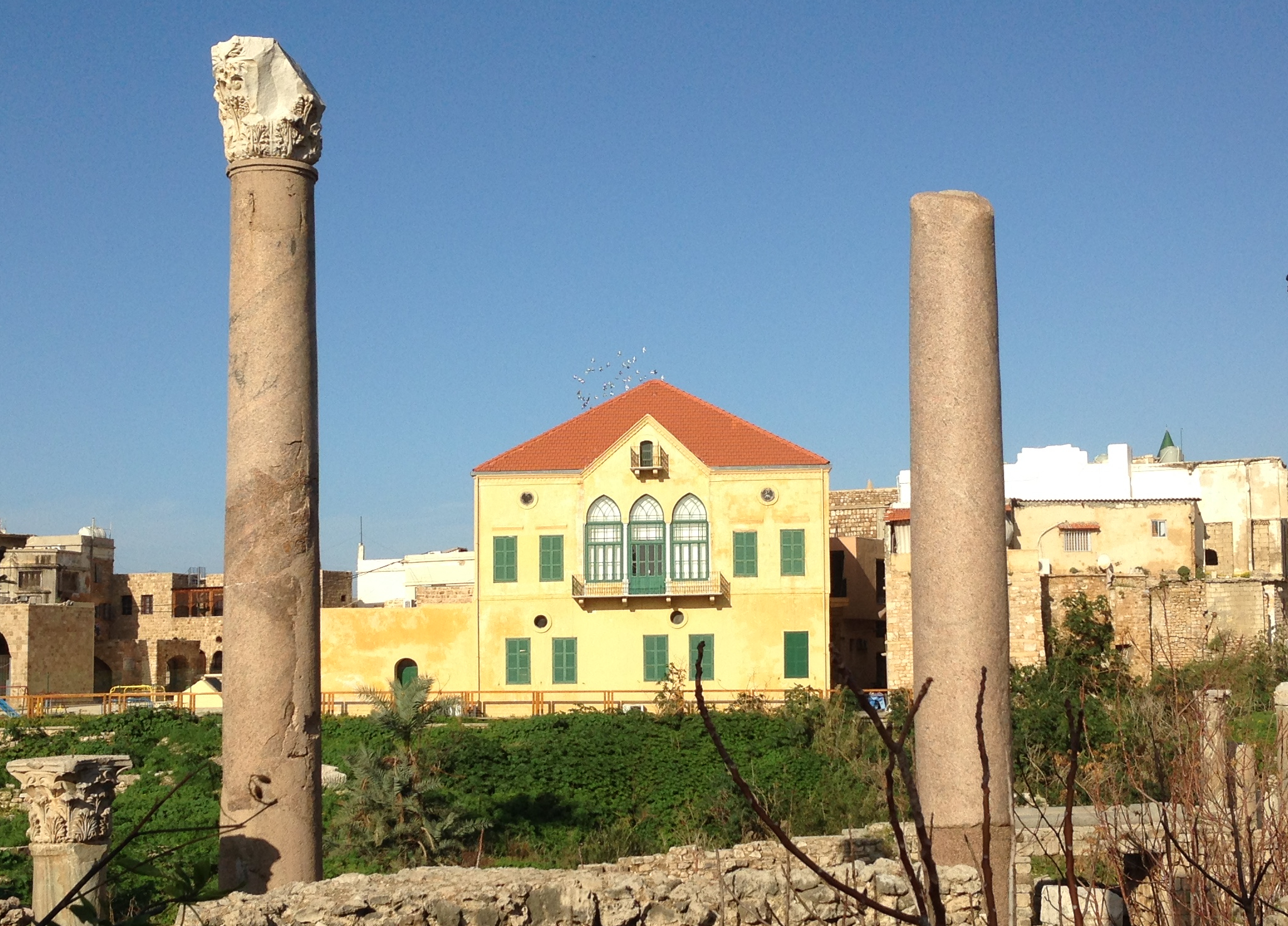
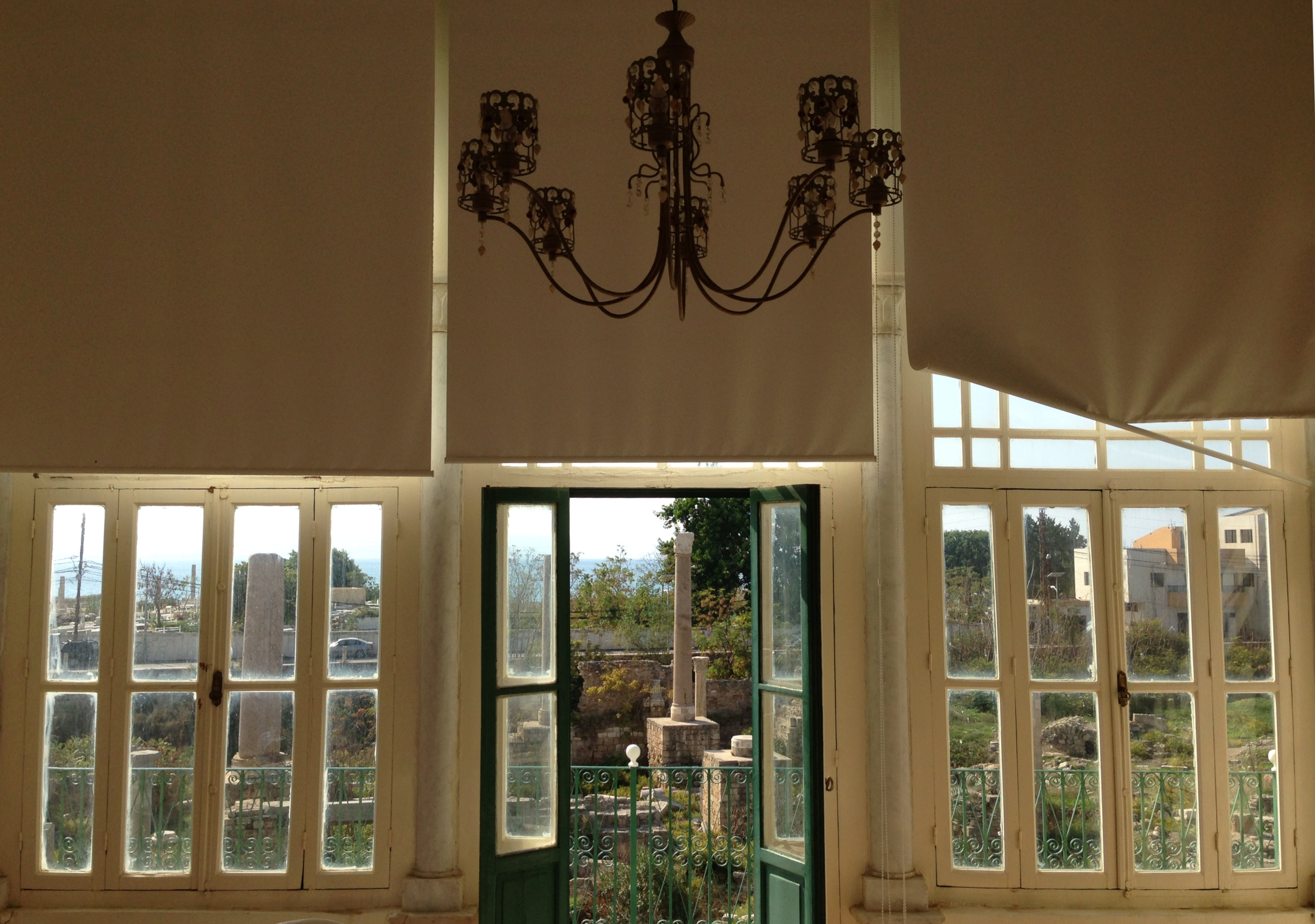
The Mamluk House: seen through the ruins of the Crusader Cathedral (above) and view from the main room over the balcony

In 1752, construction of the Melkite cathedral of Saint Thomas was started thanks to donations from a rich merchant, George Mashakka – also spelled Jirjis Mishaqa – in a place that had already housed a church during the Crusader period in the 12th century. The silk and tobacco trader had been persuaded by al-Nassar to move from Sidon to Tyre. Numerous Greek Catholic families followed him there. Mashakka also contributed considerably to the construction of a great mosque, which is nowadays known as the Old Mosque.

However, around the same time the resurgence of Tyre suffered some backlashes: the devastating Near East earthquakes of 1759 destroyed parts of the town and killed an unknown number of people as well. In 1781, al-Nassar was killed in a power-struggle with the Ottoman governor of Sidon, Ahmad Pasha al-Jazzar, who had the Shiite population decimated in brutal purges. Thus, the Shiite autonomy in Jabal Amel ended for a quarter century.

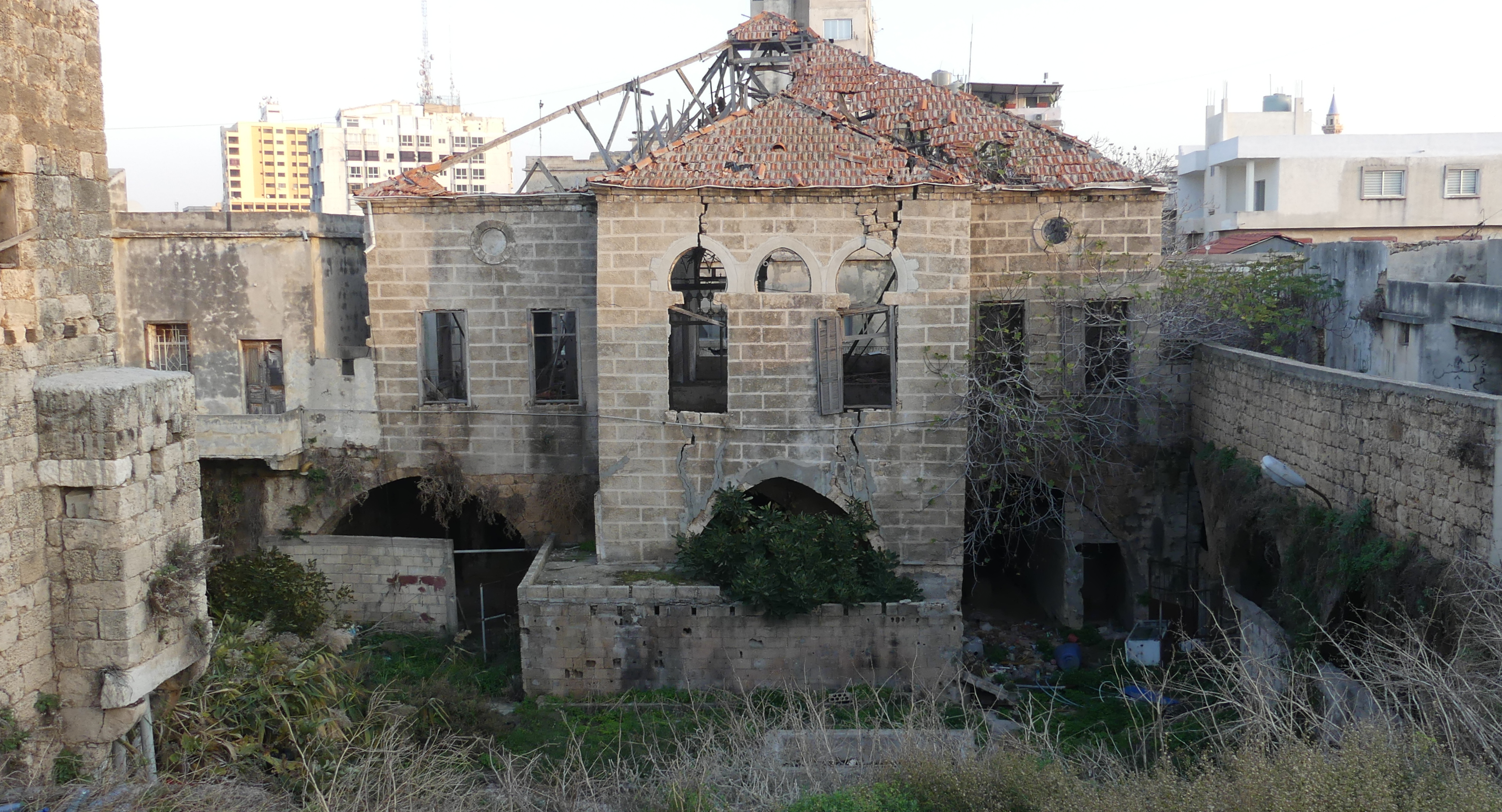
The crumbling walls and collapsing roof of Khan Rabu (2019), view across the overgrown courtyard

At the beginning of the 19th century though, another boom period set in: in 1810 a caravanserai was constructed near the former palace of Emir Younes Maani and the marketplace area: Khan Rabu. A khan was "traditionally a large rectangular courtyard with a central fountain, surrounded by covered galleries". Khan Rabu (also transliterated Ribu) soon became an important commercial center. A few years later, the former Maani Palace and military garrison was transformed into a Caravanserai Khan as well.

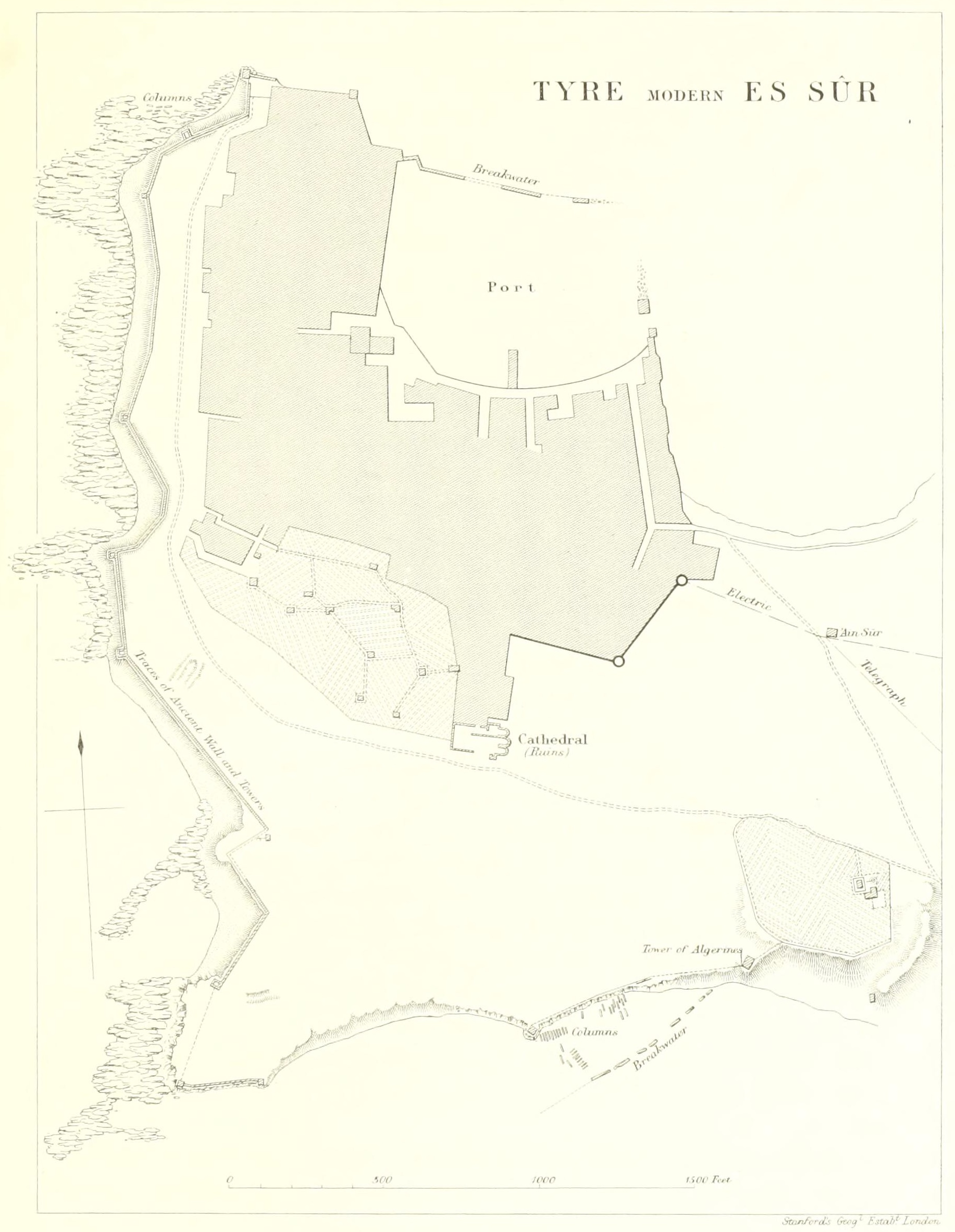
Map of Tyre from the 1871–77 PEF Survey of Palestine

In December 1831 Tyre fell under the rule of Mehmet Ali Pasha of Egypt, after an army led by his son Ibrahim Pasha had entered Jaffa and Haifa without resistance. Two years later, Shiite forces under Hamad al-Mahmud from the Ali al-Saghir dynasty (see above) rebelled against the occupation. They were supported by the British Empire and Austria-Hungary: Tyre was captured on 24 September 1839 after allied naval bombardments. For their fight against the Egyptian invaders, al-Mahmud and his successor Ali El-Assaad – a relative – were rewarded by the Ottoman rulers with the restoration of Shiite autonomy in Jabal Amel. However, in Tyre it was the Mamlouk family that gained a dominant position. Its head Jussuf Aga Ibn Mamluk was reportedly a son of the Anti-Shiite Jazzar Pasha (see above).

In 1865, Jabal Amel's ruler Ali El-Assaad died after a power struggle with his cousin Thamir al-Husain.

The 1908 Young Turk Revolution and its call for elections to an Ottoman parliament triggered a power-struggle in Jabal Amel: on the one hand side Rida al-Sulh of a Sunni dynasty from Sidon, which had sidelined the Shia El-Assad clan of the Ali al-Saghir dynasty (see above) in the coastal region with support from leading Shiite families like the al-Khalil clan in Tyre. His opponent was Kamel El-Assaad from the Ali al-Saghir dynasty that still dominated the hinterland. The latter won that round of the power-struggle, but the political rivalry between al-Khalil and El-Assaad would go on to be a main feature of Lebanese Shia politics for the next sixty years.

=== Nasif al-Nassar ===
Nasif ibn al-Nassar al-Wa'ili

Sheikh of Jabal Amil
- In office 1749 – 24 September 1781
- Preceded by: Zahir al-Nassar
- Succeeded by: Hamza ibn Muhammad al-Nassar

Personal details
- Died: 24 September 1781 Yaroun, Sidon Eyalet, Ottoman Empire
- Children: 1

Nasif ibn al-Nassar al-Wa'ili (died 24 September 1781) was the most powerful sheikh of the rural Shia Muslim (Matawilah) tribes of Jabal Amil (modern-day South Lebanon) in the mid–18th century. He was based in the town of Tebnine and was head of the Ali al-Saghir clan. Under his leadership, the Jabal Amil region prospered, due largely to the revenues from dyed cotton cloth exports to European merchants.

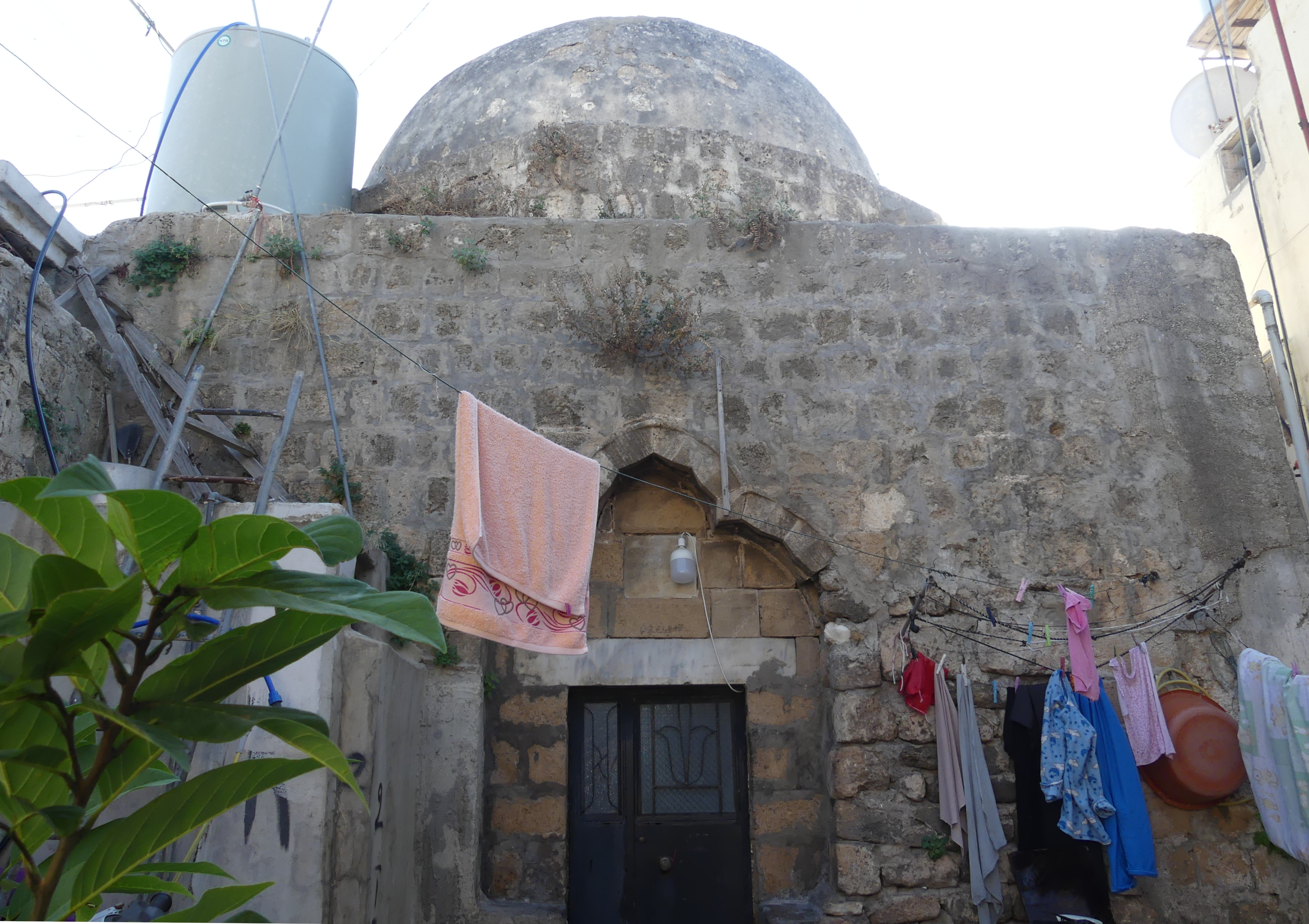
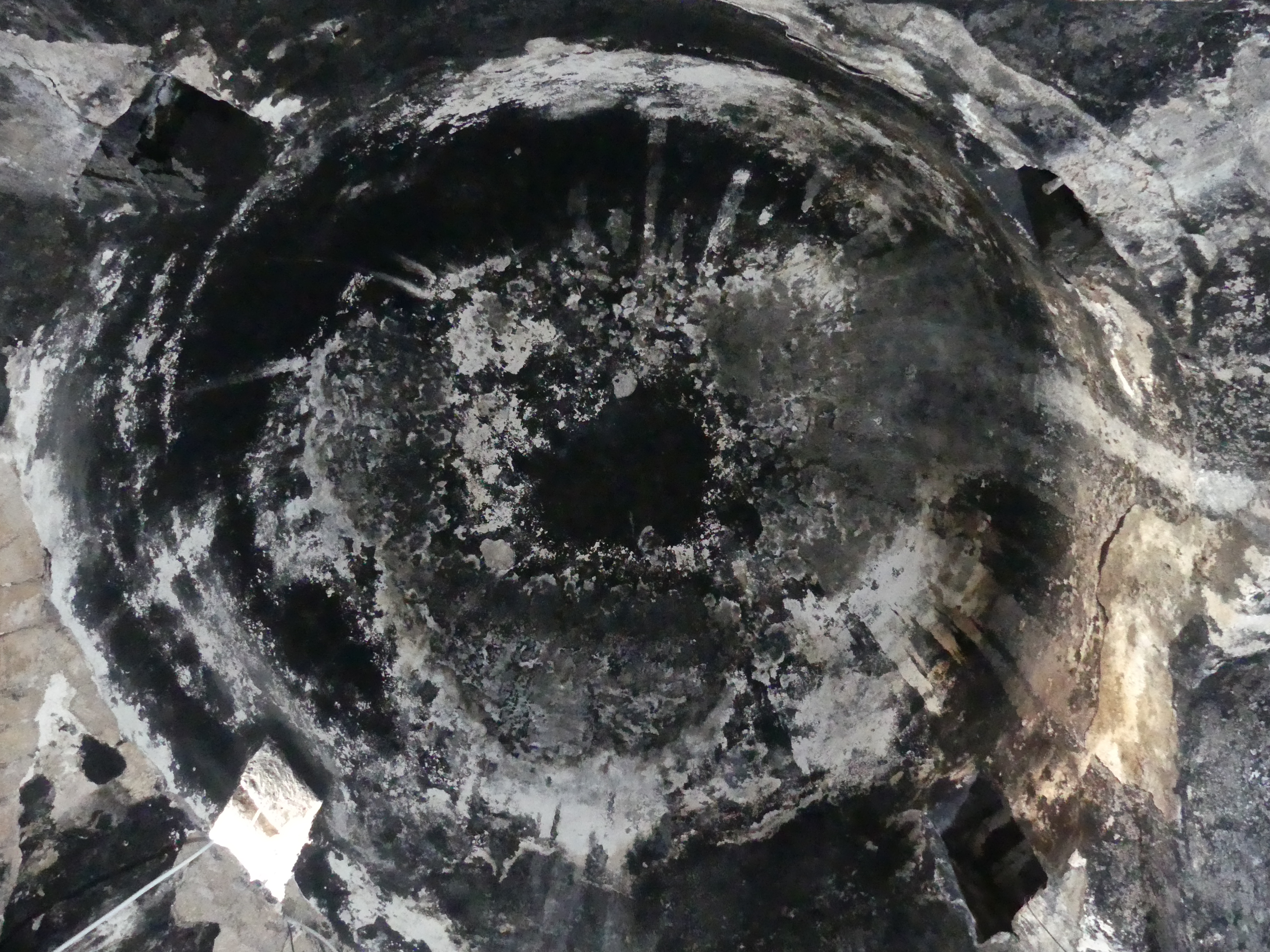
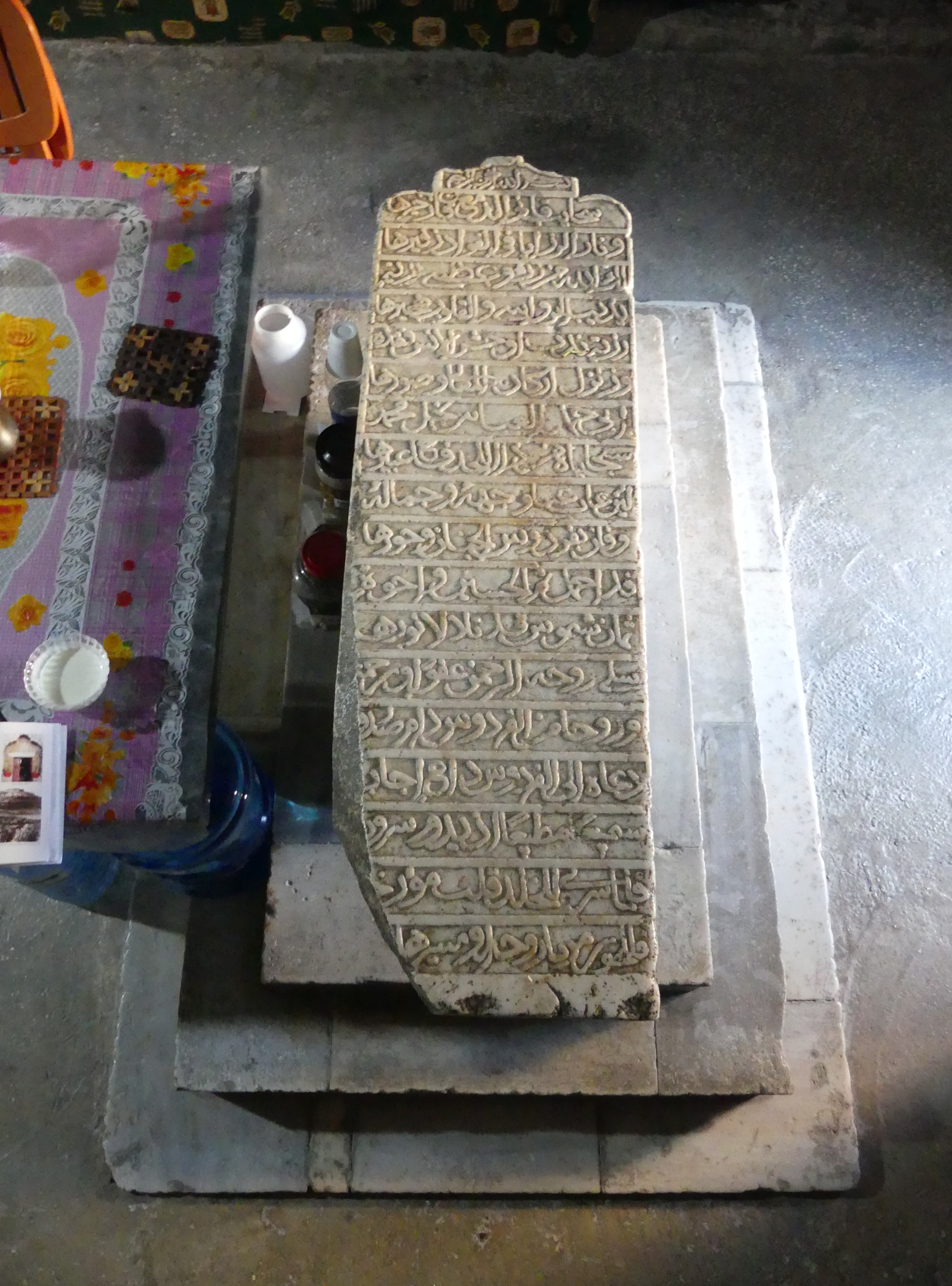
Al-Nassar's tomb in Maachouk

Nasif succeeded his brother Zahir al-Nassar as head of the Ali al-Saghir clan after Zahir died in a fall from his palace roof in 1749. Between 1750 and 1768, Nasif engaged in intermittent conflict with the autonomous Arab ruler of northern Palestine, Zahir al-Umar. In 1766, Nasif was defeated by Zahir al-Umar.(See Joudah). In September 1767, the enmity between Zahir and Nasif was such that the French consul in the area described Nasif as the principal adversary of Zahir. However, by 1768, Nasif and Zahir entered into a close and durable alliance, with both parties benefiting in their cooperation against the Ottoman governors of Sidon and Damascus. From then on, Zahir acted as the intermediary and protector of Nasif and the Shia clans vis-a-vis the Ottoman provincial authorities. Nasif, in turn, accompanied Zahir in many of his campaigns against the latter's rivals in Palestine, including the sheikhs of Jabal Nablus.

Nasif and Zahir challenged the authority of the Ottoman governors of Sidon and Damascus and their Druze allies who dominated Mount Lebanon. When this coalition of Ottoman forces launched an offensive against Nasif and Zahir in 1771, the forces of the latter two routed them in Lake Hula. After the Battle of Lake Hula, Nasif's forces, who numbered some 3,000 horsemen, decisively defeated a 40,000-strong Druze force under Emir Yusuf Shihab, killing some 1,500 Druze warriors. According to Baron Francois de Tott, a French mercenary of the Ottoman Army, Nasif's cavalry "put them to flight at the first onset".

Afterward, Nasif and Zahir's forces captured the city of Sidon, the capital of its namesake province, which included the Galilee and Jabal Amil. This victory marked the peak of Shia power in Lebanon region during the Ottoman era (1517–1917), and according to de Tott, the Metawalis became a "formidable name [sic]". Together, Nasif and Zahir ensured unprecedented security in the Galilee and south Lebanon. Following the victory at Sidon, Nasif gradually reconciled with Emir Yusuf and the powerful Druze Jumblatt clan. In September 1773, he backed Emir Yusuf in the Beqaa Valley when the latter was being attacked by Uthman Pasha's forces. Uthman Pasha's troops fled the battle when Nasif's arrival became apparent.

Zahir was defeated and killed in his capital of Acre in 1775 by the Ottomans, after which the Ottomans appointed Jezzar Pasha as Governor of Sidon and Acre. In 1780, after having consolidated his hold over the Galilee and defeating Zahir's sons, Jezzar Pasha launched an offensive against the rural sheikhs of Jabal Amil. On 24 September 1781, Nasif was shot dead in a battle with Jezzar Pasha's troops, who greatly outnumbered Nasif's cavalry, that lasted three hours. About 470 of Nasif's soldiers were also killed in the confrontation, which occurred at Yaroun. Nasif's defeat and death effectively marked the end of Shia autonomy in Jabal Amil during the Ottoman era.

Jezzar Pasha's troops proceeded to loot Shia religious places and burned many of their religious texts. Nasif's death was followed by the exile of rural Shia sheikhs to Akkar, an exodus of Shia ulama to Iraq, Iran and elsewhere, and the start of a campaign by the new head of the Ali al-Saghir clan, Hamza ibn Muhammad al-Nassar, to resist Jezzar Pasha's rule. Hamza was eventually pursued and executed. With the coming to power of Bashir Shihab II and Jezzar's replacement with Sulayman Pasha after Jezzar's death in 1804, the two leaders agreed a settlement with the Shia clans, appointing Nasif's son Faris as Sheikh al-Mashayekh (Chief of Chiefs) of Nabatieh and its territories north of the Litani River.

== Battle of Lake Huleh, 1771 ==
Battle of Lake Huleh
| Date | 2 September 1771 |
| Location | Lake Huleh, Sidon Eyalet, Ottoman Empire |
| Result | Zaydani and Metawali victory |

Belligerents
| Ottoman Empire: Damascus Eyalet; Sidon Eyalet | Zaydani clan of Galilee; Metawali clans of Jabal Amil |

Commanders and leaders
| Uthman Pasha al-Kurji | Zahir al-Umar; Nasif al-Nassar; Ali al-Zahir; Salibi al-Zahir |

Strength
| ~10,000 troops | unknown |

Casualties and losses
| unknown | unknown |

In the Battle of Lake Huleh on 2 September 1771, the rebel forces of Zahir al-Umar and Nasif al-Nassar routed the army of Uthman Pasha al-Kurji, the Ottoman governor of Damascus, at Lake Huleh in the eastern Galilee. Most of Uthman Pasha's 10,000-strong army drowned in the Jordan River as they attempted to flee Zahir's forces commanded by his son Ali al-Zahir. According to historian William Harris, the battle has been "mythologized in local historiography and poetry". Nonetheless, no official account of the battle by the Ottomans was recorded.

=== Background ===
Starting in the 1740s, the Ottoman-appointed Arab tax-farmer for most of Galilee, Zahir al-Umar, became virtually autonomous and in late 1768 he entered into an alliance with his erstwhile enemy, Sheikh Nasif al-Nassar, the virtual leader of the Shia Muslim clans of Jabal Amil (modern-day South Lebanon). By then Zahir was the de facto ruler over the Sidon Eyalet with the exception of Sidon itself.

In 1771 Zahir and Nasif joined forces with Ali Bey al-Kabir of Egypt who dispatched his lieutenants Ismail Bey and Abu al-Dhahab to conquer Ottoman Syria. The rebel alliance had the backing of the Russian Navy and captured both Sidon and Damascus in early June, driving out their governors, Darwish Pasha al-Kurji and Uthman Pasha al-Kurji, respectively, and the Druze army of Yusuf Shihab, Emir of Mount Lebanon. Shortly after, however, the Egyptian forces suddenly withdrew from Damascus on 18 June. This action surprised Zahir and Nasif who were left vulnerable to resurgent Ottoman forces in Sidon and they withdrew from that city on 20 June.

Upon Uthman Pasha's return to Damascus on 26 June, he launched an expedition to reassert his authority over areas of Palestine that Zahir was left in control of in the aftermath of the Egyptian offensive. His forces relieved the Jarrar family from Zahir's siege of Sanur and recaptured Gaza and Ramla. Uthman Pasha was unable to recapture Jaffa. He returned to Damascus where plans were set in motion to subdue Zahir and Nasif. A plan was laid out whereby Uthman Pasha would launch an offensive against Zahir's forces in the eastern Galilee and would be supported by his sons Darwish Pasha of Sidon and Muhammad Pasha of Tripoli and more critically, Emir Yusuf Shihab.

=== Battle ===
Uthman Pasha led his 10,000-strong army, commanded by himself and two viziers from Anatolia sent by the Sublime Porte, across the Jordan River from the east. Uthman Pasha's ostensible intent was not subduing Zahir, but leading the dawrah, which was the annual tour of miri (Hajj tax) collection from the villages of the region to fund the Hajj caravan. Zahir and some of his sons, having been notified of Uthman Pasha's large army and entry into Galilee, left their headquarters in Acre on 30 August and were soon joined by Nasif's large cavalry. The combined rebel force advanced toward Tiberias where Uthman Pasha had assembled his troops.

At dawn on 2 September, the rebels confronted Uthman Pasha's army in the vicinity of Lake Huleh. Emir Yusuf and his Druze forces had not yet arrived to back Uthman Pasha, leaving the latter's forces at a disadvantage. Ali al-Zahir launched an assault against Uthman Pasha's camp, while Zahir's other regiments, including Nasif's cavalry, blocked the area around the camp west of the Jordan River. As Uthman Pasha's army hastily retreated across the river, the overwhelming majority drowned. Uthman Pasha himself almost drowned, but was rescued by one of his soldiers. About 300-500 managed to survive and Uthman Pasha returned to Damascus with just three of his troops.

=== Aftermath ===
Following their victory, Zahir and Nasif decisively defeated Emir Yusuf's troops at Nabatieh on 20 October, and entered Sidon on 23 October after the withdrawal of Darwish Pasha and some 3,000 Druze forces commanded by Ali Jumblatt. On 22 October, Uthman Pasha, Darwish Pasha and Muhammad Pasha were all dismissed from their governorships. Uthman Pasha was succeeded by Muhammad Pasha al-Azm.

== Ottoman Empire ==
The El-Assaad Family had a major role in Ottoman Empire's Beyrut, Tyre and Sidon. Leaders like Kamel El-Assaad (Turkish: Kâmil El Esad Bey) Ali El-Assaad (Father), Shbib Pasha El-Assaad (son) and Ali Nassar El-Assaad (grandson) were important political figures in Ottoman's Lebanon in the 1900s, Kamel El-Assaad was Mebus (Turkish) and was a part of III. Meclis-i Mebusan and represented Beyrut. Ali Bek El-Assaad was the Ruler of Bishara Shbib Pasha El-Assaad had a role in the meetings organized in the Levant between (1877–1878), when the Russian army occupied (Adana) and headed towards Istanbul, which threatened the region with falling under a new foreign occupation, so the notables and dignitaries in the Levant met to consult on the matter of their future in When this danger occurred, Jabal Amel was represented by Shabib Pasha al-Asaad. Through these meetings, they demanded the independence of Syria in the event that the country was in danger of a foreign takeover, as they saw in Prince Abdul Qadir al-Jazaery as president of the country. Ali Nassar Bek El-Assaad was an inspector by the Ottoman Empire over the states of Aleppo and the Levant. During the French mandate, he became Minister of Agriculture and Supply in the government of Charles al-Dabbas in 1926.

== Post Ottoman Empire ==
After the Arab Revolt against the Ottoman rule started in 1916 and the Sharifian Army conquered the Levant in 1918 with support from the British Empire, the Jamal Amil feudal leader Kamel El-Assaad of the Ali al-Saghir dynasty, who had been an Ottomanist before, declared the area – including Tyre – part of the Arab Kingdom of Syria on 5 October 1918. However, the pro-Damascus regime in Beirut appointed Riad al-Sulh as governor of Sidon who in turn appointed Abdullah Yahya al-Khalil in Tyre as the representative of Faisal I.

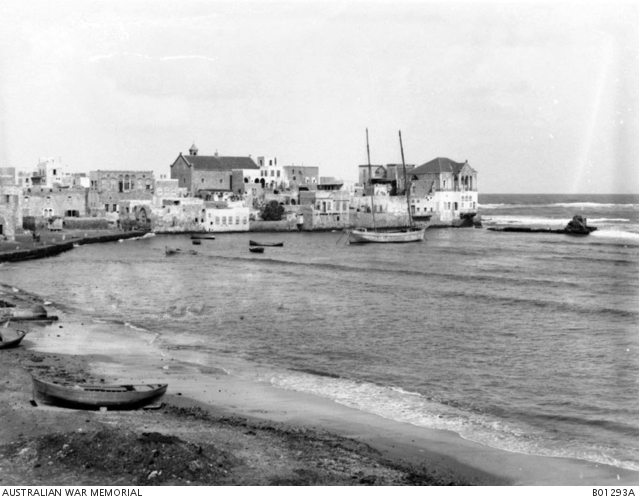
The harbour around 1918

While the feudal lords of the As'ad / Ali al-Saghir and Sulh dynasties competed for power, their support for the Arab Kingdom put them immediately into conflict with the interests of the French colonial empire: on 23 October 1918, the joint British and French military regime of the Occupied Enemy Territory Administration was declared, with Jabal Amel falling under French control.

Subsequently, the French Army used the historical garrison building of Khan Sour as a base, which had apparently been taken over as property by the Melkite Greek Catholic Archeparchy of Tyre from the Franciscan Fathers. In reaction, a guerrilla group started military attacks on French troops and pro-French elements in Tyre and the neighbouring areas, led by Sadiq al-Hamza from the Ali al-Saghir clan.

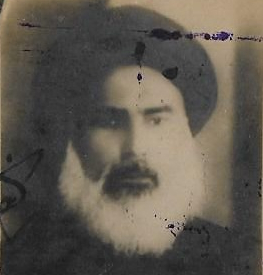
Sayed Abdul Hussein Sharafeddin

In contrast, the most prominent organiser of nonviolent resistance against the French ambitions in Jabil Amel became the Shi'a Twelver Islamic scholar Sayyid Abdel Hussein Sharafeddine (born 1872), the Imam of Tyre. He had played a decisive role in the 1908 power struggle between the El-Assaad clan of the Ali al-Saghir dynasty on the one hand side and the al-Sulh dynasty with their Tyrian allies of the al-Khalil family in favor of the former. His alliance with El-Assad strengthened after WWI, as

"He achieved his prominent position in the community through his reputation as a widely respected 'alim [religious scholar] whose books were taught in prominent Shi'ite schools such as Najaf in Iraq and Qum in Iran."

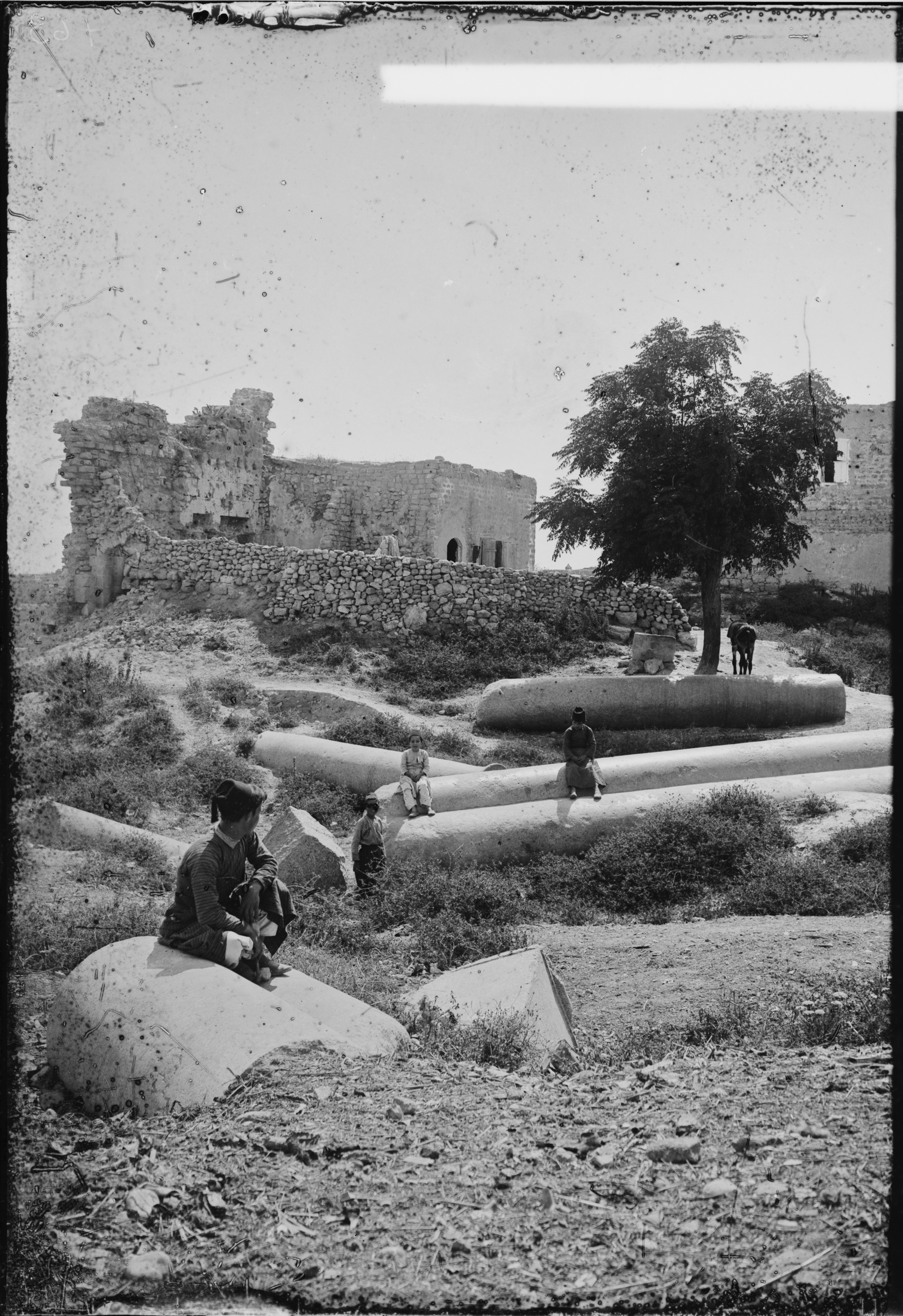
Members of the American Colony, Jerusalem, in the ruins of the Crusader Cathedral of Tyre, between 1900 and 1920

On the first of September 1920, the French colonial rulers proclaimed the new State of Greater Lebanon under the guardianship of the League of Nations represented by France. The French High Commissioner in Syria and Lebanon became General Henri Gouraud. Tyre and the Jabal Amel were attached as the Southern part of the Mandate.

Still in 1920, the first municipality of Tyre was founded, which was headed by Ismail Yehia Khalil from the Shia feudal dynasty of al-Khalil. The al-Khalil family had traditionally been allies of the al-Sulh clan, whereas Imam Sharafeddin supported the rival al-Asa'ad clan of the Ali al-Saghir dynasty since 1908 .

In 1922, Kamel El-Assaad returned from exile and started an uprising against the French occupation, but was quickly suppressed and died in 1924.

Sadr managed to gradually break up the inherited power of Kamel El-Assaad – a close ally of President Suleiman Frangieh – from the Ali al-Saghir dynasty after almost three centuries, although El-Assaad's list still dominated the South in the parliamentary elections of 1972 and the by-elections of 1974.

In the 1992 elections, Kamel El-Assaad from the feudal dynasty of Ali al-Saghir headed a list that lost against Amal. Nasir al-Khalil, the son of Tyre's former longtime deputy Kazim al-Khalil who died in 1990, was not elected either and failed again in 1996.

=== Ahmed El-Assaad ===
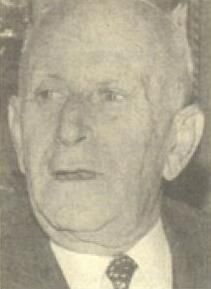
Kazem al-Khalil

When President Camille Chamoun introduced a new electoral system in 1957, El-Assaad for the first time lost the vote for deputy. He had presented his candidacy in Tyre, the stronghold of his Shia rival Kazem al-Khalil, rather than in his traditional home constituency of Bint-Jbeil.

=== 1958 Lebanese Civil War ===
As a consequence, al-Asaad became a "major instigator of events against Chamoun" and his allies, primarily al-Khalil, who likewise was a long-time member of parliament and the scion of a family of large landowners ("zu'ama") ruling through patronage systems:

"The Khalils, with their age-old ways, [..] were known for being particularly rough and hard."

During the 1958 crisis, Kazem al-Khalil was the only Shi'ite minister in the cabinet of Sami as-Sulh, to whose family the al-Khalil feudal dynasty was traditionally allied. Thus,

"Kazim's followers had a free hand in Tyre; they could carry Guns on the streets".

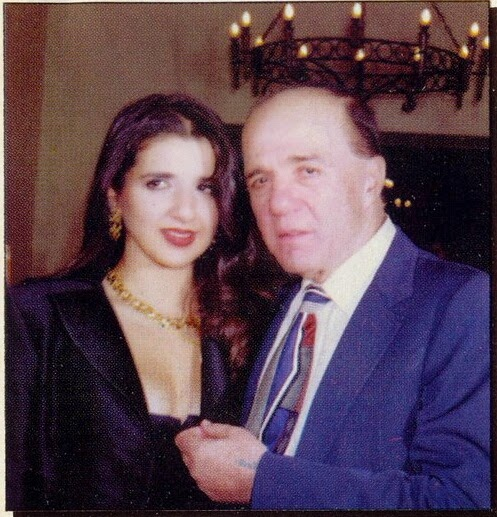
KamEl-Asaad with his daughter Iman

Then, after the formation of the United Arab Republic (UAR) under Gamal Abdel Nasser in February 1958, tensions escalated in Tyre between the forces of Chamoun and supporters of Pan-Arabism. Demonstrations took place – as in Beirut and other cities – that promoted pro-union slogans and protested against US foreign policy. A US-Diplomat, who travelled to Southern Lebanon shortly afterwards, reported though that the clashes were more related to the personal feud between El-Assaad and al-Khalil than to national politics.

Still in February, five of its students were arrested and "sent to jail for trampling on the Lebanese flag and replacing it with that of the UAR." On 28 March, soldiers and followers of Kazem al-Khalil opened fire on demonstrators and – according to some reports – killed three. On the second of April, four or five protestors were killed and about a dozen injured.

In May, the insurgents in Tyre gained the upper hand. Ahmad El-Assaad and his son Kamel al-Asaad supported them, also with weapons. According to a general delegate of the International Committee of the Red Cross (ICRC) who visited in late July, "heavy fighting went on for 16 days". Kazem al-Khalil was expelled from the city and al-Asaad' allies took over control of the city. The crisis eventually dissolved in September, when Chamoun stepped down. al-Khalil returned still in 1958, but was attacked several times by gunmen.

Despite the victory of the El-Assaad dynasty, its power soon began to crumble.

=== Kamel El-Assaad ===
Democratic Socialist Party Lebanon حزب الدمقراطي الإشتراكي
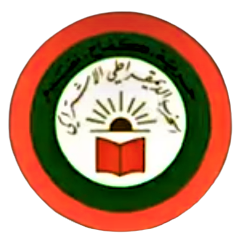
- The Social Democratic Party Shield & Flag
- Abbreviation: DSPL
- President: Lina Saad (El Assaad) (Acting President)
- Founder: Kamel Asaad
- Founded: June, 1970
- Headquarters: Tayibe, Lebanon
- Ideology: arab-nationalism, socialism, democracy, unity, sovereignty.
- National affiliation: Independent
- Colours: Green; Red; White
- Slogan: "Freedom. Struggle. Advancement."
- Military wing: El-Assaad Clan Military (1970–1982)
- Parliament of Lebanon: 0 / 128
- Cabinet of Lebanon: 0 / 20

Kamel El-Assaad served starting early 1960 as Deputy (Member of the Lebanese Parliament) of Bint Jbeil, succeeding his father late Ahmed Asaad and then held the parliamentary seat of Hasbaya-Marjayoun from 1964 and 1992. He was elected Speaker of the Lebanese Parliament several times, May to October 1964, May to October 1968, with his final stint from 1970 to 1984. Assaad chaired the parliamentary sessions, which saw the election of presidents Elias Sarkis, Bachir Gemayel, and Amine Gemayel.

Assaad left politics in 1984 after Syria's intervention in Lebanon's internal political policies related to the ratification of the Agreement of May 17, 1984, between Israel and Lebanon, and the period of political crisis which followed.

He was the founder and president of the Lebanese Social Democratic Party (Arabic: الحزب الديمقراطي الاشتراكي). He also had ministerial positions in two Lebanese governments serving as Minister of Education and Fine Arts from October 1961 to February 1964, and as Minister of Health and Minister of Water and Electricity Resources from April to December 1966.

After serving as a Member of Parliament and its Speaker several times, Assaad later ran for public office but failed to get elected in the Lebanese elections in 1992, 1996 and 2000, in the face of pro-Syrian and pro-Iranian political groups Amal and Hezbollah lists, and called for a boycott of the elections in 2005. He died in 2010, at the age of 78.

== Political parties ==
=== Lebanese Social Democratic Party ===
The Lebanese Social Democratic Party (Arabic: الحزب الديمقراطي الاشتراكي Hizb Al-Ishtiraki Al-Dimoqraty) is a party founded and led by former Lebanese speaker of parliament Kamel al-Assad.The party was founded in June 1970.

The party is hostile to Hezbollah and Amal movement, and most of their supporters are from the Lebanese Shi'a community, specifically those loyal to the House of El-Assaad. The party was neutral with most parties, and was in good relation with President Bashir Gemayel leader of the Lebanese Kateab Party.

he party does not have any members in parliament. It still attends and hosts charities, gatherings and political meetings. However, it still waits for a new leader from the El-Assaad Family. It is expected that one of Kamel Bek El-Assaad's sons from his second wife, will have leadership eventually. Currently, Lina Saad is in-charge of the party and proceeds to handle all its internal and external relations.

=== Tayyar al-Assaadi ===
Tayyar al-Assaadi is a non-registered movement/party that supports the El-Assaad Family and its feudal right. Its ideologies are similar to the Lebanese Social Democratic Party, however, it did not gain as much recognition or support as El-Assaad's other parties. They share the same slogan: 'Freedom. Struggle. Advancement', and some of the supporters, but the leaders cannot be compared. Tayyar al-Assaadi's representatives attend charities and a few political gatherings, but the party rarely has any political influence compared to the Lebanese Social Democratic Party.

Tayyar Al-Assaadi التيارالأسعدي
- President: Maan El-Assaad
- Founder: Maan El-Assaad
- Ideology: arab-nationalism, socialism, democracy, unity, sovereignty.
- National affiliation: Independent (non-registered)
- Colours: Green; Red; White
- Slogan: "Freedom. Struggle. Advancement."

Website
- https://www.tayyaralassaadi.org/en

=== Lebanese Option Party ===
Lebanese Option Party حزب الإنتماء اللبناني
- Leader: Ahmad Kamel El-Assaad
- Founded: 2007 (Movement); 2010 (Party)
- Headquarters: Beirut, Lebanon
- Ideology: Secularism; Moderate Shia Islamism; Liberalism; Economic liberalism
- Political position: Centre-right/Centre
- National affiliation: March 14 Alliance

Website
- www.lebaneseoption.org

Lebanese Option Party (LOP) (Arabic: حزب الإنتماء اللبناني, in English Lebanese Option, French L'Option libanaise) is a Lebanese secular and an economically liberal party, which is also a predominantly Shia political movement established in 2007. It is headed by Ahmad Kamel El-Assaad (Arabic: أحمد كامل الأسعد), the son of the former speaker of the Lebanese Parliament Kamel El-Assaad and the grandson of the former speaker of the Parliament Ahmad El-Assaad (Arabic: أحمد بك الأسعد).

Lebanese Option strongly protests the political hegemony of the two movements Hezbollah and Amal Movement on the Shi'ite community in Lebanon. Its platform is more in line with the Lebanese majority March 14 Alliance and greatly opposed to mainstream Shi'ite movements allied with the March 8 Alliance, namely Hezbollah and Amal Movement. But the Lebanese Option is not an official part of the March 14 Alliance and keeps an independent secular status.

== Legacy ==
- The El-Assaads owned most of the land of South Lebanon, and almost all lands bordering Palestine and Lebanon.
- They controlled one of the largest armies in Lebanon between 1700 to the early 1900s.
- The most influential Shia Leader in the 1700s was Nasif al-Nassar.
- The largest dye trade in 16th century Lebanon was run by the El-Assaads.
- Tebnin Castle, Maroun Castle, Doubiyeh Castle and Chamaa Castle were owned by the El-Assaads.
- The El-Assaads once ruled Tyre, Jabal Amel, Mount Hunin (Owned), Qana (Owned), Tebnin, Taybeh, al-Shafiq, al-Sa'abia, Nabatiyeh, Chamaa, Jbaa and Aabbassiyeh which was named after Abbas Al Nassar.

== Family and tribal ties ==
- Al Tamer Family – direct branch (Lebanon)
- Al Salman Family – direct branch (Lebanon)
- El-Amine Family – direct branch (Lebanon)
- Al Saghir Family – direct/originated branch (Lebanon)
- Al Waeli Family – originated branch (Saudi Arabia)
- Anazzah tribe – originated branch (Middle East)
- Al Qahtani clan – originated branch (Saudi Arabia)
- Bakr Bin Wael Tribe – original tribe

== Notable individuals ==
- Nasif Al Nassar – most powerful Shia sheikh in Lebanon in the 18th century.
- Ahmed El-Assaad – 3rd Legislative Speaker of Lebanon.
- Kamel Bek El-Assaad- 5th Legislative Speaker of Lebanon, Minister of Education, Minister of Water and Electricity, founder of the Lebanese Social Democratic Party.

== See also ==
- List of political families in Lebanon
- 1968 Lebanese general election in Marjeyoun-Hasbaya
- Kamel El Assaad
- List of legislative speakers of Lebanon
- Ahmed El Assaad
- Tebnine
- Belad Bechara
- Jabal Amel
- Chamaa
- Tyre, Lebanon
- Lebanese Social Democratic Party
- Lebanese Option Party
- Lebanese Shia Muslims
- Shia Dynasties
- Zaynab Fawwaz
- Haydar Rida al-Rukayni

== Bibliography ==
- Joudah, Ahmad Hasan (1987). Revolt in Palestine in the Eighteenth Century: The Era of Shaykh Zahir Al-ʻUmar. Kingston Press. ISBN 9780940670112.
- Philipp, Thomas (2013). Acre: The Rise and Fall of a Palestinian City, 1730–1831. Columbia University Press. ISBN 9780231506038.
- Harris, William (2012). Lebanon: A History, 600–2011. OUP USA. ISBN 9780195181111.
