= Supreme Islamic Shia Council =

Supreme Islamic Shia Council (abbreviated as SISC), (Arabic: المجلس الإسلامي الشيعي الأعلى pronounced as Al Majles al Islaami al Shi'i al A'la) is the supreme body of the Shias of Lebanon and an official entity meant to give the Shia more say in government. It was established in 1967 by Sayyid Musa al-Sadr.

== Establishment ==
The overall aim of Imam Musa al-Sadr was to decrease poverty and deprivation among the Shia in Lebanon. Envisioning a social movement based on Shiite Islam, and a stronger voice of the Shia community in the Lebanese political arena, Musa al-Sadr founded, as a first step, the Supreme Islamic Shia Council (SISC).

The first council was made up of 9 individuals, three of which represented the Shia religious establishment, in addition to five members of the Lebanese Parliament and one journalist. They were Imam Musa al-Sadr (as president), Sheikh Suleiman al Yahfoufi, Sheikh Khalil Ibrahim Yassin, MPs Sabri Hamadeh, Hussein el-Husseini, Fadlallah Dandache, Mohammad Abbas Yaghi, Mahmoud Ammar and the journalist Riad Taha. Also prominent in the establishment of the Council were Sheikh Mohammad Mehdi Shamseddine who later, after the disappearance of Imam Musa al-Sadr in 1978, headed the Council, and Sheikh Mahmoud Rida Farhat, the General Director of the Council.

The Supreme Islamic Shia Council (in Lebanon) is the Shia independent organizations from Sunnis. The Shii intelligentsia and customary elites had participated in this council actively. Demands of Supreme Islamic shia Council was related particularly to defenses in southern Lebanon, development funds, construction and improvement of schools and hospitals, an increased number of Shia appointees into Lebanese government positions in order to improve living conditions and prospects for future employment for the Lebanese Shia and provide more proportional representation in the Lebanese government.

== See also ==
- List of people who disappeared mysteriously (2000–present)
- List of Shi'a Muslim scholars of Islam
- Modern Islamic philosophy
- Ismail as-Sadr
- Haydar al-Sadr
- Sadr al-Din al-Sadr
- Mohammad Baqir al-Sadr
- Mohammad Sadeq al-Sadr
- Mohammad Mohammad Sadeq al-Sadr
- Lebanese people in Iran
