= 1968 Lebanese general election in Marjeyoun-Hasbaya =

Voting to elect four members of the Lebanese parliament took place in the predominantly Shia Muslim Marjeyoun-Hasbaya constituency in southern Lebanon on March 31, 1968, part of the national general election of that year. Two of the seats of the constituency were earmarked for the Shia Muslim community, one for the Sunni Muslims and one for the Greek Orthodox (for more information about the Lebanese election system, see Elections in Lebanon). The constituency had 45,849 eligible voters, out of whom 23,224 voted. The polling day was marred by heavy rains.

== Candidates ==
There were eleven candidates in the fray, with ten candidates contesting on three different tickets. The eleventh candidate contested on his own. The fight stood primarily between two tickets, each headed by a candidate from the al-As'ad family (a powerful Shiite family in the area).

=== Southern Bloc ticket ===
The main candidate of the al-As'ad family and heading one of the lists was Kamil al-As'ad, the leader of the Southern Bloc. He had been a longtime parliamentarian and minister at different occasions. His running mates were Mamduh al-Abdallah (Shiite, incumbent parliamentarian), Ra'if Samarah (Greek Orthodox, lawyer) and Ali Madi (Sunnite, lawyer and former Minister of Education).

=== As'ad al-As'ad ticket ===
The dissident list was headed by As'ad al-As'ad, former diplomat and former director of the Ministry of Information. His running mates were Ibrahim al-Abdallah (Shiite, journalist and ex-parliamentarian), Suhayl Shihab (Sunnite, ex-parliamentarian) and Iskandar Ghibril (Greek Orthodox, ex-parliamentarian, member of the Progressive Socialist Party).

=== Other candidates ===
Other candidates of leftist and nationalist tendencies, like Habib Sadiq, Ahmad Suwayd and Nuruddin Nuruddin, sought to challenge the dominance of feudal powers in the political life of the area. The latter belonged to the Syrian Social Nationalist Party.

== Results ==
All four candidates on the Southern Bloc ticket were elected. Kamil al-As'ad was elected speaker of the Chamber of Deputies after the election. Candidates' vote totals were as follows:

Candidate	Ticket	Sect	Votes	Elected?
Kamil al-Asad	Southern Bloc	Shiite	13,289	check
Ra'if Samarah	Southern Bloc	Greek Orthodox	11,787	check
Mamduh al-Abdallah	Southern Bloc	Shiite	10,720	check
Iskandar Ghibril	As'ad al-As'ad	Greek Orthodox	10,290	
Ali Madi	Southern Bloc	Sunni	9,915	check
As'ad al-As'ad	As'ad al-As'ad	Shiite	9,199	
Suhyal Shihab	As'ad al-As'ad	Sunni	5,908	
Ibrahim al-Abdallah	As'ad al-As'ad	Shiite	5,593	
Muhammad Habib Sadiq		Shiite	5,256	
Ahmad Suwayd		Sunni	4,423	
Nuruddin Nuruddin		Sunni	3,038	
Ibrahim Khalil al-Abdallah		Shiite	22	
As'ad Bayud		Greek Orthodox	2	
