= Ahmed Abdel Latif Asaad =

Lebanese politician (1902–1961)

- أحمد الأسعد
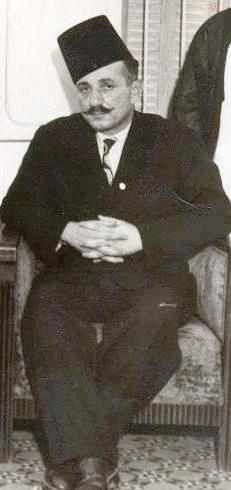

3rd Legislative Speaker of Lebanon
- In office 5 June 1951 – 13 August 1953
- Preceded by: Sabri Hamadeh
- Succeeded by: Adel Osseiran

Personal details
- Born: 1902
- Died: 16 March 1961 (age 58–59)
- Children: Kamel Asaad
- Religion: Shia Islam

Ahmad El-Assaad or Ahmad Al-As'ad (Arabic: أحمد الأسعد) (1902 – 16 March 1961) was Speaker of the Lebanese Parliament from 5 June 1951, till 30 May 1953.

== Life ==
=== Family background ===
El-Assaad was the scion of a Shia feudal dynasty, which was established by Ali Al-Saghir in the 17th century after the execution of the Druze leader Fakhreddine II by the Ottoman leadership. The El-Assaad-clan of the Ali Al-Saghir-family went on to dominate the area of Jabal Amel (modern-day Southern Lebanon) for almost three centuries, with their base originally in Tayibe, Marjeyoun District.

When the 1858 Ottoman Land reforms led to the accumulated ownership of large tracts of land by a few families upon the expense of the peasants, the Al-As'ad descendants of the rural Ali al-Saghir dynasty expanded their fief holdings as the provincial leaders in Jabal Amel.

During the French colonial ruler over Greater Lebanon (1920-1943) the mandatory regime gave Shiite feudal families like al-As'ad

"a free hand in enlarging their personal fortunes and reinforcing their clannish powers."

=== Political career ===
He was the defense minister in the cabinet of Abdul Hamid Karami from January to August 1945.

==== Deputy and speaker ====
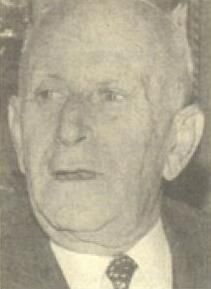
Kazem al-Khalil

When President Camille Chamoun introduced a new electoral system in 1957, El-Assaad for the first time lost the vote for deputy. He had presented his candidacy in Tyre, the stronghold of his Shia rival Kazem al-Khalil, rather than in his traditional home constituency of Bint-Jbeil.

==== 1958 Lebanese Civil War ====
As a consequence, al-Asaad became a "major instigator of events against Chamoun" and his allies, primarily al-Khalil, who likewise was a long-time member of parliament and the scion of a family of large landowners ("zu'ama") ruling through patronage systems:

"The Khalils, with their age-old ways, [..] were known for being particularly rough and hard."

During the 1958 crisis, Kazem al-Khalil was the only Shi'ite minister in the cabinet of Sami as-Sulh, to whose family the al-Khalil feudal dynasty was traditionally allied. Thus,

"Kazim's followers had a free hand in Tyre; they could carry Guns on the streets".

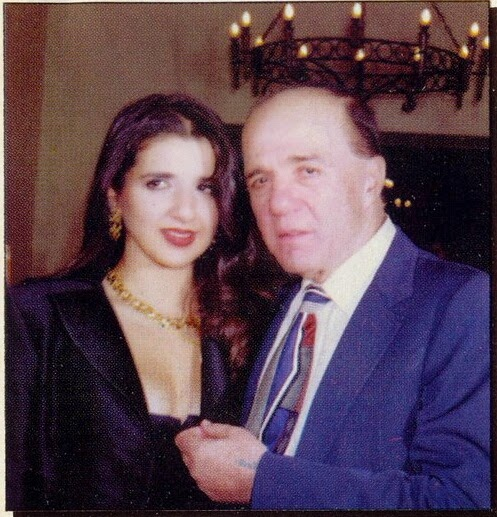
Kamel Asaad with his daughter Iman

Then, after the formation of the United Arab Republic (UAR) under Gamal Abdel Nasser in February 1958, tensions escalated in Tyre between the forces of Chamoun and supporters of Pan-Arabism. Demonstrations took place – as in Beirut and other cities – that promoted pro-union slogans and protested against US foreign policy. A US-Diplomat, who travelled to Southern Lebanon shortly afterwards, reported though that the clashes were more related to the personal feud between El-Assaad and Al-Khalil than to national politics.

Still in February, five of its students were arrested and "sent to jail for trampling on the Lebanese flag and replacing it with that of the UAR." On 28 March, soldiers and followers of Kazem al-Khalil opened fire on demonstrators and – according to some reports – killed three. On the second of April, four or five protestors were killed and about a dozen injured.

In May, the insurgents in Tyre gained the upper hand. Ahmad al-As'ad and his son Kamel al-Asaad supported them, also with weapons. According to a general delegate of the International Committee of the Red Cross (ICRC) who visited in late July, "heavy fighting went on for 16 days". Kazem al-Khalil was expelled from the city and al-Asaad' allies took over control of the city. The crisis eventually dissolved in September, when Chamoun stepped down. Al-Khalil returned still in 1958, but was attacked several times by gunmen.

== Legacy ==
His son Kamel El-Assaad (1932–2010), was speaker for three terms. The scions of its al-As'ad clan have continued to play a political role even into the 21st century, though lately a rather peripheral one.
