= Ibrahim al-Abdallah =

Lebanese journalist and politician

- ابراهيم العبدالله
- Born: Lebanon (prior to 1924 )
- Education: Sagesse College
- Occupations: Politician; journalist

Ibrahim al-Abdullah (Arabic: ابراهيم العبدالله, born c. 1924) is a Lebanese journalist and politician.

== Background ==
Al-Abdallah studied at the Sagesse College and obtained a license degree in political science. He went on to work as a journalist; between 1953 and 1958 he worked at the ad-Diyar newspaper. He was also employed as an officer in the Chamber of Deputies.

Al-Abdallah was the son of a Shiite political leader, Ali al-Abdallah, who had been serving in the parliament. Ibrahim al-Abdallah ran for parliament in the 1960 election as an independent candidate in the Marjeyoun-Hasbaya constituency, securing a seat.

Ibrahim al-Abdallah ran for parliament again in the 1968 election in Marjeyoun-Hasbaya constituency. He was the running mate of As'ad al-As'ad. He obtained 5,593 votes, not enough to regain his seat.
