= Kamel Asaad =

Lebanese politician (1932–2010)

Kamel Bek El Assaad
- كامل بك الأسعد
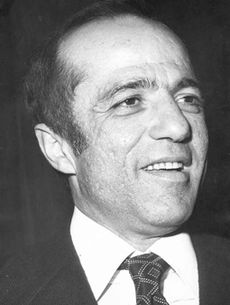
- Assaad in 1954

5th Legislative Speaker of Lebanon
- In office 20 October 1970 – 16 October 1984
- Preceded by: Sabri Hamadé
- Succeeded by: Hussein el-Husseini
- In office 9 April 1966 – 6 December 1966
- Preceded by: Sabri Hamadé
- Succeeded by: Sabri Hamadé
- In office 8 May 1964 – 20 October 1964
- Preceded by: Sabri Hamadé
- Succeeded by: Sabri Hamadé

Personal details
- Born: 10 February 1932 Taybeh, Lebanon
- Died: 25 July 2010 (aged 78) Beirut, Lebanon
- Party: Lebanese Social Democratic Party
- Spouse(s): Ghada al Kharsa (divorced); Lina Saad (2nd marriage)
- Children: Ahmed El-Assaad
- Parent: Ahmed Abdel Latif El-Assaad (father)

Kamel Bey El-Assaad (10 February 1932 – 25 July 2010) was a Lebanese politician and za'im (political boss), who founded the Lebanese Social Democratic Party in 1970.

== Political career ==
He served starting early 1960 as Deputy (Member of the Lebanese Parliament) of Bint Jbeil, succeeding his father late Ahmed Asaad and then held the parliamentary seat of Hasbaya-Marjayoun from 1964 and 1992. He was elected Speaker of the Lebanese Parliament several times, May to October 1964, May to October 1968, with his final stint from 1970 to 1984. Assaad chaired the parliamentary sessions, which saw the election of presidents Elias Sarkis, Bachir Gemayel, and Amine Gemayel.

Assaad left politics in 1984 after Syria's intervention in Lebanon's internal political policies related to the ratification of the Agreement of May 17, 1984, between Israel and Lebanon, and the period of political crisis which followed.

He was the founder and president of the Lebanese Social Democratic Party (Arabic: الحزب الديمقراطي الاشتراكي). He also had ministerial positions in two Lebanese governments serving as Minister of Education and Fine Arts from October 1961 to February 1964, and as Minister of Health and Minister of Water and Electricity Resources from April to December 1966.

After serving as a Member of Parliament and its Speaker several times, Assaad later ran for public office but failed to get elected in the Lebanese elections in 1992, 1996 and 2000, in the face of pro-Syrian and pro-Iranian political groups Amal and Hezbollah lists, and called for a boycott of the elections in 2005. He died in 2010, at the age of 78.

== Personal life ==
Coming from a large feudal Shia family 'El Assaad' from southern Lebanon, Kamel Asaad held the title of "Bakaweit" (title of nobility plural of "Beik" granted to a few wealthy families in Lebanon in the early eighteenth century). He completed his Elementary and Secondary studies at Ecole de la Sagesse (Arabic: مدرسة الحكمة) in Beirut, and continued with a law degree from the University of Paris.

His father Ahmed al-Asaad preceded his son as speaker of the Lebanese Parliament from June 1951 to May 1953. His mother was Fatima El Assaad.

He married Ghada al Kharsaa and the couple had three children, Ahmed, a son, and Iman and Maha, two daughters. After their divorce, he married Lina Saad with whom he had three more sons: the twin brothers Khalil and Abdellatif and then a third son, Wael.

Lina Kamel El Assaad, his widow, continues to head the Lebanese Social Democratic Party, the party he established.

Kamel El Assaad's son, Ahmed El Assaad, established the political party Lebanese Option (Arabic: حزب الإنتماء اللبناني). He was a candidate for a seat in the Lebanese Parliament in the elections of 2009, but failed to win against a stronger list of Amal-Hezbollah alliance.

== See also ==
- Lebanese Civil War
- Mountain War (Lebanon)
- Politics of Lebanon
