= Hussein el-Husseini =

Lebanese politician (1937–2023)

Sayyid Hussein el-Husseini
- حسين الحسيني
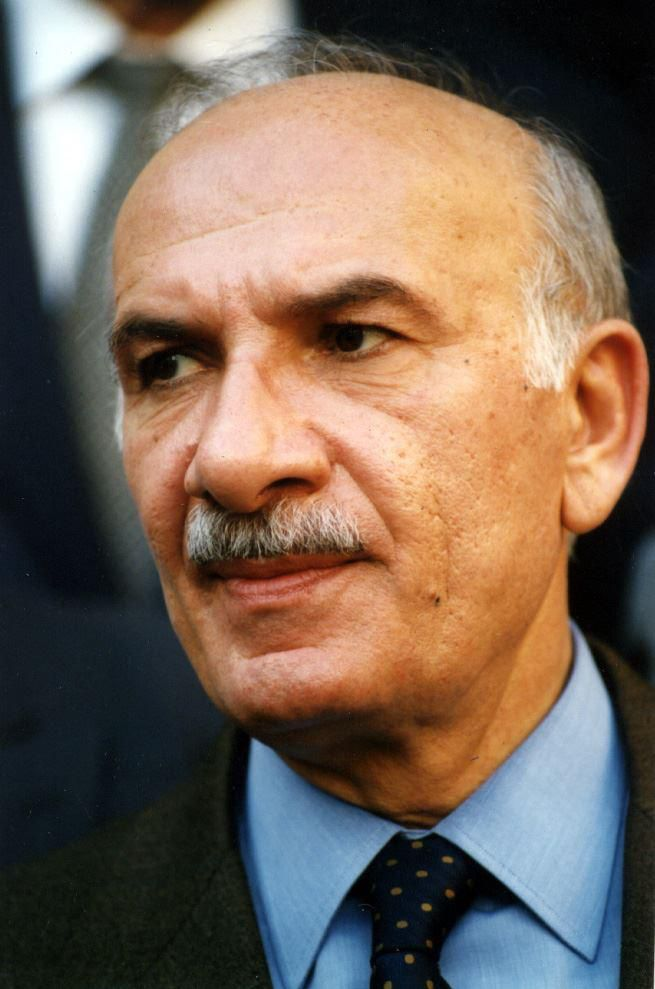

6th Speaker of the Parliament of Lebanon
- In office 16 October 1984 – 20 October 1992
- Preceded by: Kamel Asaad
- Succeeded by: Nabih Berri

Personal details
- Born: 15 April 1937 Zahlé, French Lebanon (present-day Lebanon)
- Died: 11 January 2023 (aged 85) Beirut, Lebanon
- Party: Amal Movement (until 1980)

Sayyid Hussein el-Husseini (Arabic: حسين الحسيني; 15 April 1937 – 11 January 2023) was a Lebanese statesman who served as speaker of the Lebanese parliament, and whose efforts in brokering and fathering the Taif Agreement led to the end of the Lebanese Civil War in 1990.

El-Husseini, recognized as the co-founder of both the Movement of the Deprived and its military wing, the Lebanese Resistance Regiments (collectively later known as the Amal Movement), is esteemed as one of the founding figures of the Lebanese resistance.

Initially leading the political wing of Amal, he later succeeded Musa al-Sadr as the overall leader of the movement. However, he resigned from his leadership position in 1980, driven by his opposition to the Amal Movement's escalating involvement in the civil war.

He was widely respected for his integrity and was considered to be a wise and fair leader who always prioritized the higher interests of his country. His contributions to Lebanese politics and the upholding of the rule of law were widely recognized, and he was eulogized as "Lebanon's last hero" following his death.

== Early life and political career ==
Born on 15 April 1937 in Zahlé into a prominent Shia family from Shmustar, el-Husseini was elected member of parliament in 1972, at the age of 35, after being mayor of Shmustar at 18. From 1972 to 1974, he headed the parliamentary commission of public works and hydroelectric resources. He was also a member of the parliamentary financial and budgetary commission.

In 1974, he, along with Musa al-Sadr, founded the Movement of the Deprived (later known as the Amal Movement), which initially drew its membership from el-Husseini's electoral power base in the Beqaa region. He was the closest associate of al-Sadr in the leadership of Amal, serving as head of its political wing, as well as in the Supreme Islamic Shia Council, which he had become a founding member of in 1967.

In 1978, after al-Sadr's disappearance in Libya, he became Amal's Secretary-General. He resigned from this post on 17 June 1980, following a failed assassination attempt on his life by PLO militants and after resisting pressure from Syria to engage Amal in the Lebanese Civil War. His resignation was followed by the resignation of most of Amal's founding members, Nabih Berri's Syrian-backed appointment to the leadership of Amal, and the movement's subsequent entry in the war.

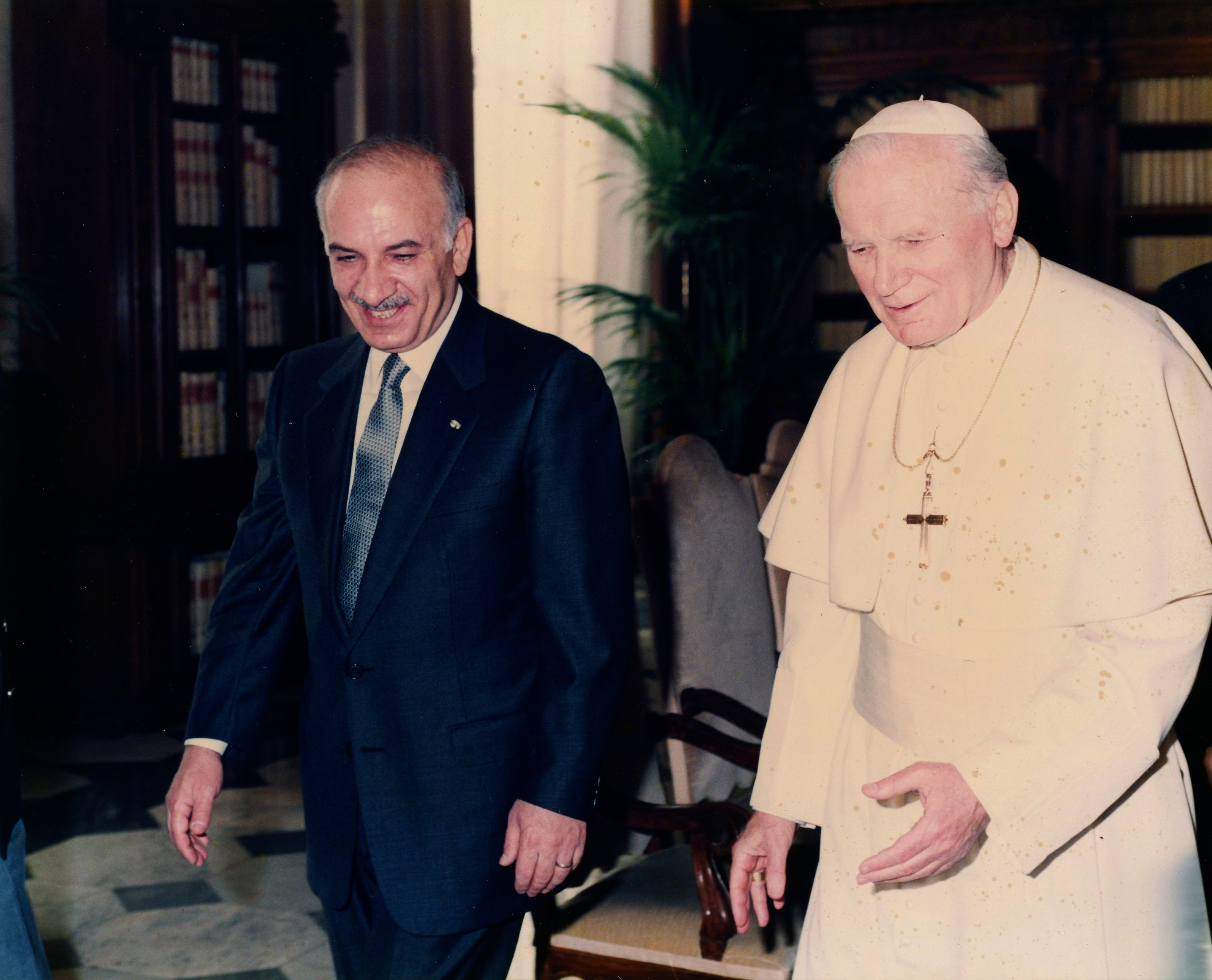
El-Husseini with Pope John Paul II in 1991

In October 1984, he was elected Speaker of the Parliament by members of parliament and remained in this post until October 1992, after serving 4 consecutive two-year terms. In 1989, while in office, el-Husseini orchestrated and presided over the Taif Agreement, held in the Kingdom of Saudi Arabia, which led to the end of the Lebanese Civil War (1975–1990). He is known to be the father of the agreement. Husseini is also credited with revoking both the Cairo Agreement and the May 17 Agreement.

In 1992, Berri was backed by the Syrians during their military presence in Lebanon to replace Husseini as Speaker, as Husseini had refused, despite enormous pressure, to pass a law that would allow Rafic Hariri (and later Solidere) to expropriate land and property in the Beirut Central District and compensate owners with shares in the company worth as little as 15% of the property's value.

On 12 August 2008, in a speech during the vote of confidence for the new government, Husseini announced his resignation from parliament, expressing his fury at how the constitution was being torn.

El-Husseini remained a strong advocate of democracy, civil society and transparency in his community. Husseini's Civil Center for National Initiative succeeded in persuading the Ministry of Interior to allow Lebanese citizens to remove mentions of their sectarian affiliation from civil records.

== Death ==
On 11 January 2023, el-Husseini died. He was buried in his hometown of Shmustar in a state funeral, with thousands of mourners, including much of the political class and cabinet, in attendance. Caretaker Prime Minister Najib Mikati declared a three-day national mourning period.

El-Husseini was eulogized and mourned by politicians from across the political spectrum. According to the Washington Post, “his stature in Lebanon was reflected by the warm tributes from factions he once denounced”.

== Legacy ==
Nicknamed Abu t-Taif (Father of the Taif Agreement) or ʿArrab at-Taif (Godfather of the Taif Agreement) for his role in fathering the peace accords that ended the Lebanese Civil War, el-Husseini was strongly and actively opposed to Lebanon's sectarian political system, and was a leading critic of Lebanon's post-war Hariri-led governments' economic and fiscal policies that eventually led to the Lebanese liquidity crisis, which became apparent in 2019. He enjoyed wide respect for his integrity and for being one of very few politicians in Lebanon not involved in the country's endemic corruption.

Widely known as "the guardian of the Lebanese Constitution and the rule of law", he was described as belonging "to that rare class of Lebanese political leaders who refused to safeguard their top positions by bloodying their hands" and as "one of the few Lebanese politicians who always refused Lebanon’s subordination to foreign powers".

Lebanese statesman Raymond Eddé famously nicknamed him the "seventh pillar of the Temple of Baalbek", while Lebanese nationalist poet Said Akl wrote, in 1972, that el-Husseini's "presence in parliament compensates for the backwardness of parliament" and that he would "from now on, know the value of parliament based on whether or not el-Husseini is participating in it".

Palestinian historian Tarif Khalidi wrote of him:

The “Sayyid” embodied in his person true patriotism, was a maker of his country’s constitution and loyal to it, well-versed in his knowledge of its laws and legislation, insightful into the higher interests of his country, majestic, dignified, wise, fair in presiding over his parliament, skilled in his speech and logic. Arab causes, especially Palestine, had always been very close to his heart.

Despite all of this, he was an aristocrat without bravado, with great humility and above doing harm. [He was a man] of dignity coupled with amiability, of sincerity to his friends, with kindness and endearing humor. He had a low, or rather, soft voice, and an amazing physiognomy that he undoubtedly inherited from his ancestor [the Prophet Muhammad].

Following his death, he was eulogized as "Lebanon's last hero" and as a "champion of a Lebanese civil state - perhaps the last such champion Lebanon will know".

== See also ==
- List of speakers of the Parliament of Lebanon
