= Haydar Rida al-Rukayni =

Haydar Rida al-Rukayni was an 18th-century chronicler of the Twelver Shia Muslim community of Jabal Amil.

== Background ==
Haydar ibn Rida al-Rukayni was born in 1711 to a Twelver Shia Muslim ('Metawali') family in the Jabal Amil highlands (modern South Lebanon), though his specific locality is not known. At the time the region formed part of the Ottoman Empire. Although uncommon among farmers of his time, Rukayni was literate, likely a result of the strong Shia Muslim scholarly tradition in Jabal Amil during the Ottoman period.

== Chronicle ==
Rukayni's life coincided with the political and military rise of the Metawali community led chiefly by the rural sheikh Nasif al-Nassar. Nasif and his peers benefited from their alliance with the Acre-based ruler of the Galilee, Daher al-Umar, to emerge as a powerful regional force. Rukayni chronicled this period in the history of Jabal Amil from 1749 until his death in 1784. His son, whose name is not known, completed the chronicle, covering the period up to 1832, when the son moved to Damascus.

The Rukaynis' work represents the first contemporary chronicle of events in Jabal Amil and is the only known Arabic–Islamic chronicle authored by farmers. Much of the chronicle focuses on the Metawali feudal families and their struggles and relations with the Ottoman governors of Sidon, to which Jabal Amil administratively belonged, and the neighboring potentates, like Daher al-Umar and the Druze emirs of the Shihab family in Mount Lebanon. An incomplete edition was first published in the Shia journal Al-Irfan in 1938–1939. Later editions, based on the Al-Irfan version, were published under the title Jabal ʿĀmil fi Qarn 1163–1274 H/1749–1832 by Ahmad Hutayt in Beirut in 1997 and Hasan Muhammad Salih in Beirut in 1998. The original manuscript is lost.

== Bibliography ==
- Bualuan, Hayat El Eid (2023). Lebanese Historical Thought in the Eighteenth Century (ebook ed.). New York and Abingdon, Oxon: Routledge. ISBN 978-1-003-02343-2.
- Conermann, Stephan; Seidensticker, Tilman (2007). "Some Remarks on Ibn Ṭawq's (d. 915/1509) Journal Al-Taʿliq, vol. 1 (885/1480 to 890/1485)". Mamluk Studies Review. 11 (2): 121–136. doi:10.6082/M19021V0.
- Sajdi, Dana (2013). The Barber of Damascus: Nouveau Literacy in the Eighteenth-Century Ottoman Levant. Stanford: Stanford University Press. ISBN 978-0-8047-8828-1.
