= Nasif al-Nassar =

Sheikh of the rural Shia Muslim

Nasif ibn al-Nassar al-Wa'ili
- In office 1749–1781

Sheikh of Jabal Amil
- In office 1749 – 24 September 1781
- Preceded by: Dahir al-Nassar
- Succeeded by: Hamza ibn Muhammad al-Nassar

Personal details
- Died: 24 September 1781 Yaroun, Sidon Eyalet, Ottoman Empire
- Children: Faris ibn Nasif al-Nassar (son)

Nasif ibn al-Nassar al-Wa'ili (Arabic: ناصيف النصار; died 24 September 1781) was the most powerful sheikh of the rural Shia Muslim (Matawilah) tribes of Jabal Amil (modern-day South Lebanon) in the mid-18th century. He was based in the town of Tebnine and was head of the Ali al-Saghir clan. Under his leadership, the Jabal Amil prospered, due largely to the revenues from dyed cotton cloth exports to European merchants.

== Rule ==
=== Conflict and alliance with Daher al-Umar ===
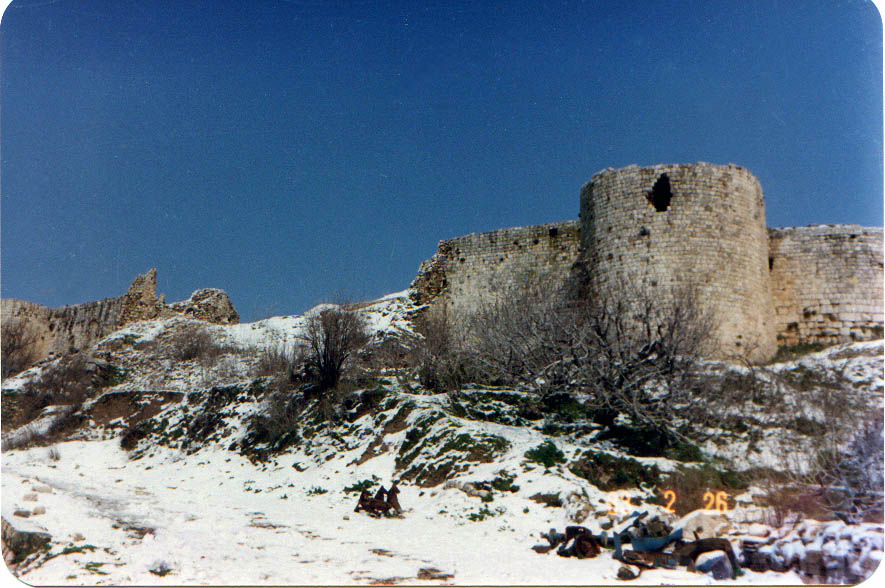
Nasif used the fortress of Tebnine as his headquarters

Nasif succeeded his brother Daher al-Nassar as head of the Ali al-Saghir clan after Daher died in a fall from his palace roof in 1749. Between 1750 and 1768, Nasif engaged in intermittent conflict with the autonomous Arab ruler of northern Palestine, Daher al-Umar. In 1766, Nasif was defeated by Daher al-Umar.(See Joudah). In September 1767, the enmity between Daher and Nasif was such that the French consul in the area described Nasif as the principal adversary of Daher. However, by 1768, Nasif and Daher entered into a close and durable alliance, with both parties benefiting in their cooperation against the Ottoman governors of Sidon and Damascus. From then on, Daher acted as the intermediary and protector of Nasif and the Shia clans vis-a-vis the Ottoman provincial authorities. Nasif, in turn, accompanied Daher in many of his campaigns against the latter's rivals in Palestine, including the sheikhs of Jabal Nablus.

Nasif and Daher challenged the authority of the Ottoman governors of Sidon and Damascus and their Druze allies who dominated Mount Lebanon. When this coalition of Ottoman forces launched an offensive against Nasif and Daher in 1771, the forces of the latter two routed them in Lake Hula. After the Battle of Lake Hula, Nasif's forces, who numbered some 3,000 horsemen, decisively defeated a 40,000-strong Druze force under Emir Yusuf Shihab, killing some 1,500 Druze warriors. According to Baron Francois de Tott, a French mercenary of the Ottoman Army, Nasif's cavalry "put them to flight at the first onset".

Afterward, Nasif and Daher's forces captured the city of Sidon, the capital of its namesake province, which included the Galilee and Jabal Amil. This victory marked the peak of Shia power in Lebanon region during the Ottoman era (1517–1917), and according to de Tott, the Metawalis became a "formidable name [sic]". Together, Nasif and Daher ensured unprecedented security in the Galilee and south Lebanon. Following the victory at Sidon, Nasif gradually reconciled with Emir Yusuf and the powerful Druze Jumblatt clan. In September 1773, he backed Emir Yusuf in the Beqaa Valley when the latter was being attacked by Uthman Pasha's forces. Uthman Pasha's troops fled the battle when Nasif's arrival became apparent.

=== Downfall ===
Daher was defeated and killed in his capital of Acre in 1775 by the Ottomans, after which the Ottomans appointed Jezzar Pasha as Governor of Sidon and Acre. In 1780, after having consolidated his hold over the Galilee and defeating Daher's sons, Jezzar Pasha launched an offensive against the rural sheikhs of Jabal Amil. On 24 September 1781, Nasif was shot dead in a battle with Jezzar Pasha's troops, who greatly outnumbered Nasif's cavalry, that lasted three hours. About 470 of Nasif's soldiers were also killed in the confrontation, which occurred at Yaroun. Nasif's defeat and death effectively marked the end of Shia autonomy in Jabal Amil during the Ottoman era.

Jezzar Pasha's troops proceeded to loot Shia religious places and burned many of their religious texts. Nasif's death was followed by the exile of rural Shia sheikhs to Akkar, an exodus of Shia ulama to Iraq, Iran and elsewhere, and the start of a campaign by the new head of the Ali al-Saghir clan, Hamza ibn Muhammad al-Nassar, to resist Jezzar Pasha's rule. Hamza was eventually pursued and executed. With the coming to power of Bashir Shihab II and Jezzar's replacement with Sulayman Pasha after Jezzar's death in 1804, the two leaders agreed a settlement with the Shia clans, appointing Nasif's son Faris as Sheikh al-Mashayekh (Chief of Chiefs) of Nabatieh and its territories north of the Litani River.

== Legacy ==
Nasif is an ancestor of the El Assaad, a Lebanese political family. In Jabal Amil's popular folklore, Nasif is held in high esteem for dying in defense of his people. According to journalist Nicholas Blanford, the guerrilla campaigns of the predominantly Shia Amal Movement and Hezbollah against Israeli forces during the latter's occupation of South Lebanon (1982–2000) were "drawn, in part, from the same cultural well-spring of defiance and dignity that had sustained" Nasif's 18th-century military campaigns.

== Bibliography ==
- Blanford, Nicholas (2011). Warriors of God: Inside Hezbollah's Thirty-Year Struggle Against Israel. Random House Publishing Group. ISBN 9780679605164.
- Chalabi, Tamara (2006). The Shi'is of Jabal 'Amil and the New Lebanon: Community and Nation-State. Palgrave Macmillan. ISBN 9781403982940.
- Harris, William (2012). Lebanon: A History, 600–2011. OUP USA. ISBN 9780195181111.
- Joudah, Ahmad Hasan (1987). Revolt in Palestine in the Eighteenth Century: The Era of Shaykh Zahir Al-ʻUmar. Kingston Press. ISBN 9780940670112.
- Thackston, Wheeler McIntosh (1988). Murder, Mayhem, Pillage, and Plunder: The History of the Lebanon in the 18th and 19th Centuries by Mikhayil Mishaqa (1800–1873). SUNY Press. ISBN 9780887067129.
- Philipp, T. (2013). Acre: The Rise and Fall of a Palestinian City, 1730–1831. Columbia University Press. ISBN 9780231506038.
- Winter, Stefan (2010). The Shiites of Lebanon under Ottoman Rule, 1516–1788. Cambridge University Press. ISBN 9781139486811.
