= May 17 Agreement =

1983 peace treaty between Israel and Lebanon during the Lebanese Civil War

The May 17 Agreement of 1983 was an agreement signed between Lebanon and Israel during the Lebanese Civil War on May 17, 1983, after Israel invaded Lebanon to end cross border attacks and besieged Beirut in 1982. It called for the withdrawal of the Israeli Army from Beirut and provided a framework for the establishment of normal bilateral relations between the two countries. Lebanon was under both Israeli and Syrian military occupations during its negotiation.

== Political background ==
The agreement was signed on May 17, 1983 by Mr. William Drapper for the United States, Mr. David Kimche for Israel and Mr. Antoine Fattal for Lebanon. Lebanese President Amine Gemayel had recently been elected after the assassination of his brother President-elect Bachir Gemayel, a longtime ally of Israel, by the Syrian Social Nationalist Party. Some Lebanese backed President Amin Gemayel, arguing that its close relations to the US could help create peace and restore Lebanese sovereignty, which they saw as threatened not only by the Israeli occupation but also by the Syrian occupation.

== Terms of the agreement ==
The agreement terminated the state of war between Israel and Lebanon that had lasted since the 1948 Arab-Israeli War and provided for a staged withdrawal of Israeli forces, on the condition of the establishment of a Lebanese Army "security zone" in South Lebanon along the border area. It contained numerous clauses detailing security cooperation between Lebanon and Israel designed to prevent the Palestine Liberation Organization (PLO) and other groups from infiltrating the border areas.

== Collapse of the agreement ==
The agreement called for the Lebanese Army to take over Israeli positions. The confessionalist government of Lebanon collapsed on 6 February 1984 under the weight of a mounting civil war in Beirut from rival sectarian factions and Lebanon could not keep its side of the agreement. In March 1984, the Lebanese cabinet formally cancelled the agreement. On 21st May 1987, the agreement was unanimously revoked by all of the present 49 deputies of the Lebanese parliament under the leadership of newly-elected speaker Hussein el-Husseini, who replaced speaker Kamel Asaad who had supported the agreement. In the same session, the Lebanese parliament also unanimously revoked the 1969 Cairo Agreement which had hitherto served as the legal basis for the PLO's use of Lebanese territory to lunch armed attacks against Israel, and which limited the jurisdiction of the Lebanese government over the Palestinian refugee camps and the operations of Palestinians inside Lebanon more broadly.

The May 1983 Accord had met strong opposition from Lebanese Muslims and in the Arab world, and it was portrayed as an imposed surrender. The conclusion of separate peace with Israel was (and is) a taboo subject in the Arab world, and Egypt's peace agreement at Camp David had left the country ostracized and temporarily expelled from the Arab League. Syria's opposition to the agreement was vocal, and by refusing to move its troops from Lebanese soil, Damascus effectively torpedoed its implementation, since Israeli withdrawal was contingent on Syria doing the same. As a result, the Lebanese government repudiated the agreement on March 5, 1984.

Israel insisted on the treaty's implementation, and threatened that it would impose its terms with or without Lebanese consent, but Lebanese public opinion protested—and more importantly, the fragile civil war peace process started to unravel.

== Later developments ==
In 2000, Israel withdrew from its foothold in South Lebanon. Israeli Prime Minister Ehud Barak had pledged to pull out of Southern Lebanon as part of his election campaign, though it is widely believed that he did so due to a belief that he would be able to make peace with Syria before the evacuation, thereby removing an obstacle to Israeli-Lebanese peace.

When peace talks between Israel and Syria broke down over the nature of a withdrawal on the Golan Heights, Barak decided to pull out without an agreement, causing many, especially in the Arab world, to view this as a victory for Hezbollah, which had been waging a long guerrilla campaign against Israeli forces. As a result, Lebanon and Israel formally remain at war, and Lebanon officially refuses to recognize Israel as a state.

=== Shebaa farms ===
Whereas a cease-fire is in effect along most of the border, Lebanon considers the Shebaa Farms area of the Golan Heights, to be under continued Israeli occupation. Hezbollah refers to this as a reason for continued armed resistance, and occasionally stages raids into this area; Israel responds with shelling and counter-raids in the Shebaa Farms or on other points along the border. These exchanges occasionally produces a flare-up in fighting.

The United Nations has recognized Israel as having fully disengaged from Lebanon, thus opposing the Lebanese demands for the Shebaa. The U.N., like Israel, instead considers the Shebaa Farms to be part of Syria's Golan Heights, currently under Israeli occupation, pending a future peace deal. The Syrian position on this remains somewhat complicated: the Syrian government backs the Lebanese demands for the Shebaa, but refuses to provide maps documenting Lebanese ownership of the area.

In 2005, the Syrian government reportedly considered formally ceding the Shebaa Farms to Lebanon, but no such action was taken. In early 2006, after the so-called Cedar Revolution, parts of the Lebanese anti-Syrian block—such as Druze leader Walid Jumblatt—started officially questioning Lebanon's demands for the Shebaa. He argued that the area is in fact Syrian, and that this issue is used by Syria and Hezbollah as a pretext for the latter to maintain its status as an armed resistance organization outside the Lebanese Army. This led to heated debate, with Jumblatt opposed by Hezbollah, Amal and other pro-Syrian Lebanese groups, while other parties tried to find a middle ground.

== See also ==
- List of Middle East peace proposals
- 1983 Beirut barracks bombings
