= Louis Dubertret =

Louis Dubertret was born on 18 June 1943 in Douai, France. He had a distinctive career as an associate professor specializing in dermatology and cutaneous biology, is now a professor emeritus, and currently serves as the president of the René Touraine Foundation (fr: Fondation René Touraine).

== Biography ==
=== Education ===
Dubertret studied in Douai and Amiens before entering the Paris Faculty of Medicine. In 1965 he was an extern at the hospitals of Paris as well as a student of Maurice Tubiana in cancer research and of Fred Siguier, a specialist in internal medicine.

In May 1968, he served on a committee to reform medical studies. Some of the committee's recommendations were enacted into the Orientation Law, proposed by Edgar Faure in November 1968.

In 1970, Dubertret started his residency and discovered the importance of dermatological manifestations in internal medicine, thanks to professors Jean Hewitt and René Touraine. From 1972 to 1973, Dubertret was an assistant attaché in experimental pathology at the Paris Faculty of Medicine. He wrote his thesis on psoriasis physiopathology, finishing his residency in 1975.

=== Academic career ===
In 1975, Dubertret suggested to Touraine that they set up a research laboratory in dermatology at Henri Mondor Hospital. From 1975 to 1977, Dubertret was an associate clinical director and an assistant professor in fundamental science at the Creteil Faculty of Medicine. In 1977, he became clinical director.

From 1976 to 1977, he created a degree in cutaneous physiology. In 1982, he became an associate professor of dermatology at Paris West, then at Paris VII.

From 1989 to 2009, Dubertret was the head of the Department of Dermatology at Saint-Louis Hospital, the national reference center for that specialty. From 1987 to 1989, Dubertret was also a member of the National Council of Universities, and in 1993 he became director of the national masters in biology and cutaneous pharmacology at the doctoral school B2T. He was also responsible for continuing medical education in dermatology at the Entretiens de Bichat from 1995 to 2005.

In September 2012, Dubertret's university functions ended and he became professor emeritus.

== Medical contributions ==
=== Healthcare – Therapeutic education ===
As senior consultant at Saint-Louis Hospital, Dubertret set up dedicated outpatient consultations to assemble specific expertise in each kind of disease. In his department, dermatology was subdivided into dedicated outpatient consultations:psoriasis, melanoma, rare genetic skin diseases, contact allergies, and photobiology.

In 1995, Dubertret formalized a new medical treatment of chronic diseases, composed of four steps: questioning, explanation, negotiation, and prescription, which allowed systematic universal care of patients.

=== Sabouraud Health Center ===
In 1993, with Edouard Couty and Pascal Reygagne, Dubretret created the Sabouraud Health Center at the Saint-Louis Hospital in Paris. Dubertret is the president of this center, specializing in skin and hair.

== Scientific contributions ==
=== Cutaneous inflammation and psoriasis ===
Louis Dubertret and his team developed methods to study cutaneous inflammation in vitro and in vivo. First, they developed histology methods to study the new functions of inflammatory skin cells. Then they optimized the technique of "suction bubbles" and "skin chambers". This technique allowed them to study in vivo human molecular and cellular events implicated in inflammatory reactions, particularly in psoriasis and in allergic reactions.

This quantitative and dynamic approach to the in vivo inflammation in humans contributed to a better understanding of psoriasis. In therapeutic research, Dubertret coordinated several studies to evaluate anti-psoriatic drugs. In 2005, the René Touraine Foundation (fr: Fondation René Touraine), under the leadership of Dubertret, initiated—in collaboration with eleven European countries—the Psoriasis International Network, a network aimed to develop clinical and therapeutic research for psoriatic patients.

=== Photobiology ===
In 1997, Raymond Latarjet entrusted Dubertret with the development of French research on drugs activated by light: psoralen. Dubertret coordinated the research activities of six fundamental research laboratories in photobiology to discover new photoactive molecules.

He was also responsible for the Cooperative Research Program of CNRS on photoactive molecules and of the Department of Clinical Research of INSERM.

This work won the Galien Prize in 1989, the first time the award was given to a public laboratory.

Dubertret was also elected president of the French Society of Photobiology in 1987. That same year, he was named to the French Health Ministry as an expert in matters that concern the sun and skin.

=== Organogenesis in vitro ===
With his team, Dubertret demonstrated that cellular behavior is different in vivo and in vitro. He reconstructed, in vitro, the cellular environment met in vivo. With Eugène Bell, from MIT, he developed the concept of organogenesis in vitro and developed a human skin model composed of dermis and epidermis with normal or pathologic cells.

In 1983, thanks to this technique, the world's first transplants of entirely reconstructed human skin were performed on 16 patients with significant cutaneous malformations or burns.

This work was awarded the City of Paris Vermeil Medal, as well as the Claude-Bernard Grand Prize, which was presented in 1988 by Jacques Chirac, then the mayor of Paris.

In 1987, the laboratory became a research unit of INSERM.

=== Academy/industry collaborations ===
Dubertret spent time from 1993 to 1996 developing the Skin Research Institute at the Saint-Louis Hospital with the help of public subsidies and private donations—particularly from Chanel and l’Oréal. He went on to head this institute until 2009.

As a public/private collaboration within the Saint-Louis Hospital, this bioclinical research laboratory worked with research teams from l’Oreal to better understand healthy skin reactions to environmental stresses and strains, and, in particular, the molecular process of skin aging. In 2008, this laboratory became the L’Oreal Research Center.

== Involvement in international medical and scientific actions ==
In 1991, Dubertret created the René Touraine Foundation, an international nonprofit, non-governmental organization (NGO) that aims to develop partnerships between stakeholders in therapeutic progress to improve the quality of care in dermatology around the world.

The Foundation encourages international collaborations through the allocation of research fellowships and organizes an annual international scientific conference focused on building knowledge about one specific type of skin cell each year.

The Foundation also fosters two international networks centered on patient needs: the Genodermatoses Network and the Psoriasis International Network.

To make available updated therapeutic information on dermatology for practitioners and the general public, the Foundation has published (in French) a free, web-based reference book on dermatology, Thérapeutique Dermatologique. Parts of this book have been translated to English under the name Therapeutics in Dermatology.

In 2006, Dubertret was elected President of the Board of the European Dermatology Forum (EDF), the European dermatology professors' association. During his presidency, the EDF achieved a harmonization of dermatology graduate studies across European medical faculties.

Louis Dubertret is also an expert at the European Union Committee of Experts on Rare Diseases, as coordinator of the European project, "Together Against Genodermatoses", co-funded by the European Union from 2008 to 2011.

== Awards and distinctions ==
- 1988: City of Paris Claude-Bernard Grand Prize for medical research
- 1988: City of Paris Vermeil Medal
- 1989: Galien Award
- 1994: Award of "Order of Malta"

== Bibliography ==
- Dubertret L. L’Homme et son programme. Denoël, Paris, 1975. Philosophical essay with a preface by Jean Fourastié.
- Dubertret L, Ed. Les Cancers cutanés. (Encyclopédie des cancers) Flammarion Médecine – Sciences, Paris, 1992, 583p.
- Dubertret L, Jeanmougin M. La peau et le soleil. Hermann, Paris, 1993, 116p.
- Dubertret L. Psoriasis. 1993 (published in French, English and Italian) ISED Éditions du Dôme.
- Dubertret L, Santus R, Morlière P. Ozone, Sun, Cancer: Molecular and Cellular Mechanisms, Prevention. Éditions Inserm, Paris, 1995, 288p.
- Dubertret L. contributions to L'ozone stratosphérique, Académie des Sciences, rapport N°41, Lavoisier, Technique et Documentation, 1998
- Dubertret L. Psoriasis : de la clinique au traitement. Med’Com : Paris, 2004, 159 p / in English 2005, second edition 2008.
- Dubertret L. Psoriasis: Consensus and controversies, 2006 (online book with expert comments)
- Dubertret L. Soleil et santé, Rapports de l’Académie Nationale de Médecine, Lavoisier, 2006, 168 p.
