= Lebanese Option Party =

Lebanese Option Party حزب الإنتماء اللبناني
- Leader: Ahmed Kamel Asaad
- Founded: 2007 (Movement); 2010 (Party)
- Ideology: Islamic democracy Anti-Hezbollah
- Religion: Shia Islam
- National affiliation: March 14 Alliance

Website
- www.lebaneseoption.org

Lebanese Option Party (Arabic: حزب الإنتماء اللبناني) is a Lebanese political party. It is headed by Ahmad Kamel Asaad, the son of the former speaker of the Lebanese Parliament Kamel El-Assaad and the grandson of the former speaker of the Parliament Ahmad El-Assaad.

Lebanese Option strongly protests the political hegemony of the two movements Hezbollah and Amal Movement on the Shi'ite community in Lebanon. Its platform is more in line with the Lebanese March 14 Alliance and greatly opposed to mainstream Shi'ite movements allied with the March 8 Alliance, namely Hezbollah and Amal Movement. But the Lebanese Option is not an official part of the March 14 Alliance and keeps an independent secular status.

In early June 2013, a Lebanese Option activist, and head of the party's student wing Hashem Salman was shot dead during a protest outside the Iranian Embassy in Beirut. The protest, organized by the LOP, criticized Hezbollah's involvement in the Syrian Civil War. In mid-October 2013, its leader, Ahmad El-Assaad, called for Lebanon to cut ties with Bashar al-Assad's government and the expulsion of its ambassador.
