= Za'im system =

Patronage system in Lebanon

The Za'im system, also known as zuama clientelism, is a patronage system in Lebanon. A political boss, known as a Za'im (plural Zuama), is from a leading family in the country's electoral districts. They manipulate elections and distribute political favors and financial rewards to the highest bidder. A za'im can run for office or encourage votes for another to have another in his debt. Votes are often obtained through bribery or force. Individuals elected to parliament view their primary goal to serve the needs of their local clients, neglect any national issues and use parliament to further their regional-sectarian interests. The Za'im dressed in tailored European suits, which misled many visitors at the time. According to As'ad AbuKhalil, many Zuama became warlords during the Lebanese Civil War (1975–1990). He has also stated that they are often sponsored by foreign governments, through which foreign embassies play a role in making political decisions in Lebanon.

== List of prominent Lebanese Zuama ==
=== Current ===
- Nabih Berri
- Walid Jumblatt
- Taymur Jumblatt
- Saad Hariri
- Amine Gemayel
- Samir Geagea
- Michel Aoun
- Fouad Siniora
- Boutros Harb
- Naim Kassem

=== Former ===
- Hassan Nasrallah
- Kamal Jumblatt
- Camille Chamoun
- Rafic Hariri
- Raymond Eddé
- Bachir Gemayel
- Henri Philippe Pharaoun
- Riad Al Solh
- Majid Arslan
- Kamel Asaad
- Joseph Skaff
- Saeb Salam

== See also ==
- Lebanese Civil War
- Lebanese Front
- Lebanese National Movement
- Lebanese National Resistance Front
- Politics of Lebanon

== Bibliography ==
- Alain Menargues, Les Secrets de la guerre du Liban: Du coup d'état de Béchir Gémayel aux massacres des camps palestiniens, Albin Michel, Paris 2004. ISBN 978-2226121271 (in French)
- Denise Ammoun, Histoire du Liban contemporain: Tome 2 1943-1990, Fayard, Paris 2005. ISBN 978-2-213-61521-9 (in French) –
- Edgar O'Ballance, Civil War in Lebanon, 1975-92, Palgrave Macmillan, London 1998. ISBN 0-333-72975-7
- Fawwaz Traboulsi, Identités et solidarités croisées dans les conflits du Liban contemporain; Chapitre 12: L'économie politique des milices: le phénomène mafieux, Thèse de Doctorat d'Histoire – 1993, Université de Paris VIII, 2007 (in French)
- Itamar Rabinovich, The war for Lebanon, 1970–1985, Cornell University Press, Ithaca and London 1989 (revised edition). ISBN 978-0-8014-9313-3, 0-8014-9313-7 –
- Rex Brynen, Sanctuary and Survival: the PLO in Lebanon, Boulder: Westview Press, Oxford 1990. ISBN 0 86187 123 5 –
- Robert Fisk, Pity the Nation: Lebanon at War, London: Oxford University Press, (3rd ed. 2001). ISBN 0-19-280130-9 –
- Thomas Collelo (ed.), Lebanon: a country study, Library of Congress, Federal Research Division, Headquarters, Department of the Army (DA Pam 550-24), Washington D.C., December 1987 (Third edition 1989). –
