= Taybeh, Marjayoun =

At-Taybah طيبة الطيبة (مرجعيون)
- Municipality
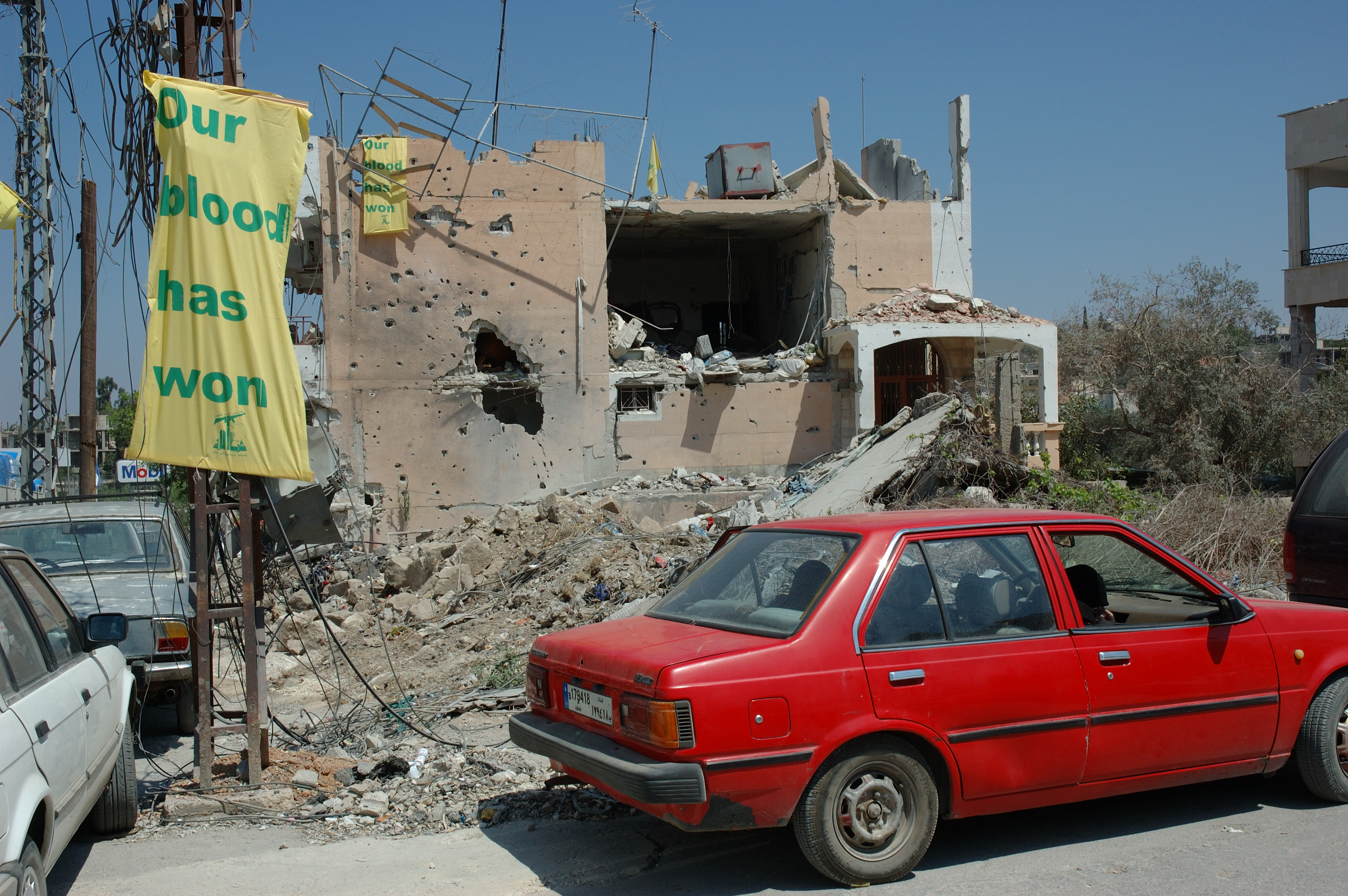
- Hezbollah posters in At-Taybah after the 2006 Lebanon War

- Location within Lebanon
- Coordinates: 33°16′35″N 35°31′14″E
- Grid position: 198/297 PAL
- Country: Lebanon
- Governorate: Nabatieh Governorate
- District: Marjayoun District
- Elevation: 700 m (2,300 ft)
- Time zone: UTC+2 (EET)
  - Summer (DST): UTC+3 (EEST)
- Dialing code: +961

At-Taybah, Tayibe or Taibeh (Levantine Arabic: طيبة, romanized: Ṭaybeh) is a municipality in the Marjayoun District in south Lebanon.

== Etymology ==
According to E. H. Palmer, the name Tayibe means "The good, sweet, or wholesome" (about water).

== Archaeological site ==
Tayibe
- Et Taibeh
- Et Tayibe
- Interactive map of Tayibe
- Periods: Heavy Neolithic
- Cultures: Qaraoun culture
- Location: 2 kilometres (1.2 mi) south of the Litani River

Site notes
- Archaeologists: Louis Dubertret and Jacques Cauvin
- Public access: Unknown

By the village is a Heavy Neolithic archaeological site of the Qaraoun culture.

The site was discovered by Louis Dubertret and materials studied by Jacques Cauvin. Heavy Neolithic materials recovered resembled those from Qaraoun.

== History ==
In 1875, Victor Guérin found here a village with 800 Metualis. He further noted: "Its principal mosque, now in ruins, is built of superb blocks, apparently ancient. It contains in the interior several monolithic columns."

In 1881, the PEF's Survey of Western Palestine (SWP) noted here: "There are several sarcophagi and cisterns in the village; some caves near." They further described it as: "A large well-built village, built of stone, containing about 600 Metawileh and 400 [Sunni] Moslems. The Caimacam has a good house here. There are some figs and olives round the village and arable land; water is supplied from a spring and two birkets."

=== Modern era ===
On August 5, during the 2006 Lebanon War, Israeli war-planes killed 3 civilians, aged 2 to 48 years of age. The IDF offered no explanations to the strike.

On 11 August 2024, two Hezbollah fighters were killed by an Israeli airstrike in the village. On 6 April 2025, funerals were held in Taybeh for 32 Hezbollah fighters and a Lebanese soldier killed during the war.

During the first two weeks of April 2026, more than 400 buildings in Taybeh, including a mosque, were destroyed by Israel during its occupation of southern Lebanon.

== Demographics ==
In 2014 Muslims made up 99.61% of registered voters in At-Taybah. 99.27% of the voters were Shiite Muslims.

== See also ==
- Battle of Ayta ash-Shab

== Bibliography ==
- Conder, C.R.; Kitchener, H.H. (1881). The Survey of Western Palestine: Memoirs of the Topography, Orography, Hydrography, and Archaeology. Vol. 1. London: Committee of the Palestine Exploration Fund.
- Guérin, V. (1880). Description Géographique Historique et Archéologique de la Palestine (in French). Vol. 3: Galilee, pt. 2. Paris: L'Imprimerie Nationale.
- HRW (2007). Why They Died: Civilian Casualties in Lebanon During the 2006 War. Human Rights Watch.
- Palmer, E.H. (1881). The Survey of Western Palestine: Arabic and English Name Lists Collected During the Survey by Lieutenants Conder and Kitchener, R. E. Transliterated and Explained by E.H. Palmer. Committee of the Palestine Exploration Fund.
