= List of members of the first Parliament of Lebanon =

This is a list of the members of the 1st Lebanese parliament. It had 46 members. 30 of them were elected during the 1927 elections and the other 16 were added to body after the abolishment of the Senate.

== Members ==
Province	Method of election	Ethnic group seat	Elected members
Beirut	Elected in 1927	Greek Catholics	Salim Najjar
Beirut	Elected in 1927	Greek Orthodox	Nakhleh Tweini
Beirut	Elected in 1927	Maronite	Émile Eddé
Beirut	Elected in 1927	Maronite	Albert Kashou'h
Beirut	Elected in 1927	Minorities	Ayoub Tabet
Beirut	Elected in 1927	Sunni	Abdallah Bayhum
Beirut	Elected in 1927	Sunni	Cheikh Mohammad al-Kasti
Beirut	Existing members of the Representative Council	Greek Orthodox	Petro Trad
Beirut	Existing members of the Representative Council	Maronite	Georges Tabet
Beirut	Existing members of the Representative Council	Minorities	Michel Chiha
Beirut	Existing members of the Representative Council	Sunni	Omar Bayhum
Beirut	Existing members of the Representative Council	Sunni	Omar Daouk
Beqaa	Existing members of the Representative Council	Greek Catholics	Elias Tohmeh Skaff
Beqaa	Existing members of the Representative Council	Greek Orthodox	Chibl Dammous
Beqaa	Existing members of the Representative Council	Maronites	Mousa Nammour
Beqaa	Existing members of the Representative Council	Shi'ites	Sobhi Haidar
Beqaa	Existing members of the Representative Council	Shi'ites	Sabri Hamadeh
Beqaa	Existing members of the Representative Council	Sunnis	Hussein Qaz'oun
Mount Lebanon	Elected in 1927	Druze	Sami Arslan
Mount Lebanon	Elected in 1927	Maronite	Habib Pacha Es-Saad
Mount Lebanon	Elected in 1927	Maronite	Bechara El Khoury
Mount Lebanon	Elected in 1927	Shi'ite	Ahmad al-Husseini
Mount Lebanon	Existing members of the Representative Council	Druze	Fouad Arslan
Mount Lebanon	Existing members of the Representative Council	Druze	Jamil Talhouk
Mount Lebanon	Existing members of the Representative Council	Greek Orthodox	Ibrahim al-Mounzer
Mount Lebanon	Existing members of the Representative Council	Maronites	Roukoz Abou Nader
Mount Lebanon	Existing members of the Representative Council	Maronites	Yousef al-Khazen
Mount Lebanon	Existing members of the Representative Council	Maronites	Najib Sa'ad
Mount Lebanon	Existing members of the Representative Council	Maronites	Emile Tabet
Mount Lebanon	Existing members of the Representative Council	Maronites	Georges Zwein
North Lebanon	Elected in 1927	Greek Orthodox	Jubran Nahhas
North Lebanon	Elected in 1927	Maronite	Youssef Estephan
North Lebanon	Existing members of the Representative Council	Greek Orthodox	Nicolas Ghossa
North Lebanon	Existing members of the Representative Council	Maronites	Mas'oud Younes
North Lebanon	Existing members of the Representative Council	Maronites	Wadih Tarabey
North Lebanon	Existing members of the Representative Council	Sunnis	Adra Khaireddine
North Lebanon	Existing members of the Representative Council	Sunnis	Abboud Abdel Razzak
South Lebanon	Elected in 1927	Shi'ite	Fadl al-Fadl
South Lebanon	Elected in 1927	Shi'ite	Hussein al-Zein
South Lebanon	Existing members of the Representative Council	Greek Catholics	Yousef Salem
South Lebanon	Existing members of the Representative Council	Maronites	Habib Nassif
South Lebanon	Existing members of the Representative Council	Shi'ites	Najib Oseiran
South Lebanon	Existing members of the Representative Council	Shi'ites	Abdullatif al-Asaad
South Lebanon	Existing members of the Representative Council	Shi'ites	Yousef al-Zein
South Lebanon	Existing members of the Representative Council	Sunnis	Khaled Chehab
Tripoli	Elected in 1927	Sunni	Cheikh Mohammad al-Jisr
