= List of members of the second Parliament of Lebanon =

This is a list of members of the second Parliament of Lebanon, serving from 1929 to 1932.

== List of members ==
Name	Constituency	Sect
Ibrahim Haidar	Beqaa	Shia
Elias Tohma Skaf	Beqaa	Greek Catholic
Hussain Qazoun	Beqaa	Sunni
Shebel Dammous	Beqaa	Greek Orthodox
Sabry Hamada	Beqaa	Shia
Moussa Nammour	Beqaa	Maronite
Emile Eddeh	Beirut	Maronite
Petro Trad	Beirut	Greek Orthodox
George Thabet	Beirut	Maronite
Hussein Al-Ahdab	Beirut	Sunni
Halim Kaddoura	Beirut	Sunni
Abdullah Ishaq	Beirut	Minorities
Abdullah Bihm	Beirut	Sunni
Mohammed Al-Fakhoury	Beirut	Sunni
Henry Pharaoh	Beirut	Greek Catholic
Elias Fayyad	Beirut	Greek Orthodox
Nicolas Fayyad	Beirut	Greek Orthodox
Ahmed Al-Husseini	Mount Lebanon	Shia
Iskandar Bustani	Mount Lebanon	Maronite
Anees Khoury	Mount Lebanon	Maronite
Bechara El Khoury	Mount Lebanon	Maronite
Gabriel Nassar	Mount Lebanon	Greek Orthodox
Habib Pasha Saad	Mount Lebanon	Maronite
Rashid Jumblatt	Mount Lebanon	Druze
Roukoz Abu Nader	Mount Lebanon	Maronite
Salim Talhouk	Mount Lebanon	Druze
Michel Zakour	Mount Lebanon	Maronite
Youssef El-Khazen	Mount Lebanon	Maronite
Youssef Al-Souda	Mount Lebanon	Maronite
Tawfiq Arslan	Mount Lebanon	Druze
Majeed Arslan	Mount Lebanon	Druze
Mohammed Al-Jisr	Tripoli	Sunni
Rashad Adeeb	Tripoli	Sunni
George Yaqoub	South	Greek Catholic
Khaled Shehab	South	Sunni
Sami Kanaan	South	Maronite
Abdul Latif Al-Asaad	South	Shia
Ali Nasrat Al-Asaad	South	Shia
Fadel al-Fael	South	Shia
Najeeb Osseiran	South	Shia
Youssef Al-Zein	South	Shia
Abdullah Nofal	North	Greek Orthodox
Abboud Abdul Razzaq	North	Sunni
Qablan Franjieh	North	Maronite
Masoud Younes	North	Maronite
Nicolas Ghosn	North	Greek Orthodox
Youssef Stephan	North	Maronite
