= List of members of the third Parliament of Lebanon =

This is a list of members of the third Parliament of Lebanon, serving from 1934 to 1937.

== List of members ==
Name	Governorate	Sect
Ibrahim Haider	Beqaa	Shia
Elias Tohma Skaf	Beqaa	Greek Catholic
Sabry Hamada	Beqaa	Shia
Mohammed Amin Qazoun	Beqaa	Sunni
Ayoub Thabet	Beirut	Minorities
Gabriel Khabaz	Beirut	Greek Orthodox
Charles Debbas	Beirut	Greek Orthodox
Petro Trad	Beirut	Greek Orthodox
Khairuddin Al-Ahdab	Beirut	Sunni
Vahram Leilekian	Beirut	Armenian Orthodox
Emile Eddah	Beirut	Maronite
Ibrahim Al-Mundhir	Mount Lebanon	Greek Orthodox
Khalil Abi Allama	Mount Lebanon	Greek Orthodox
Bechara El Khoury	Mount Lebanon	Maronite
Hikmat Jumblatt	Mount Lebanon	Druze
Farid El-Khazen	Mount Lebanon	Maronite
Camille Chamoun	Mount Lebanon	Maronite
Majeed Arslan	Mount Lebanon	Druze
Michel Zakour	Mount Lebanon	Maronite
Khaled Shehab	South	Sunni
Joyful Fadl	South	Shia
Najeeb Osseiran	South	Shia
Presenter Secretary	North	Sunni
Hamid Franjieh	North	Maronite
Mohammed Abboud Abdul Razzaq	North	Sunni
Nicolas Ghosn	North	Greek Catholic
Shebel Issa El Khoury	North	Maronite
Naguib Hanna El Daher	North	Maronite

== Legislative Speakers ==
Speakership		Portrait	Name	Party
1	30 January 1934 – 10 November 1934		Charles Debbas	Pro-France
2	10 November 1934 – 22 October 1935		Petro Trad	Pro-France
3	22 October 1935 – 29 October 1937		Khaled Chehab	Pro-France
