= List of speakers of the Parliament of Lebanon =

Speaker of the Parliament of the Lebanese Republic
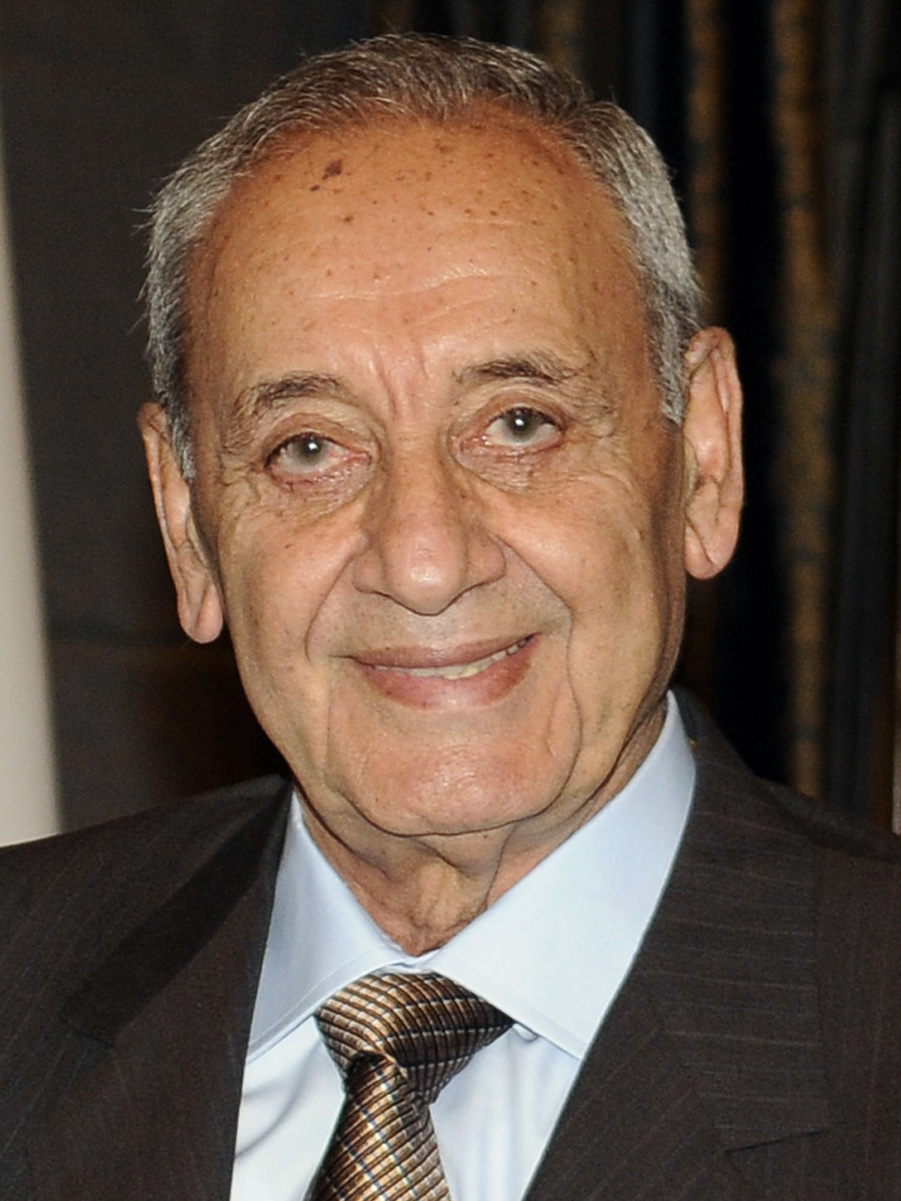
- Incumbent; Nabih Berri since 20 October 1992
- Residence: Beirut
- Term length: 4 years
- Inaugural holder: Sabri Hamadé; 21 September 1943
- Formation: Constitution of Lebanon; 23 May 1926
- Salary: £L212,844,000 annually
- Website: Parliament of Republic of Lebanon

This is a list of speakers of the Parliament of Lebanon since the office was created in 1922.

== National Pact ==
Though the constitution does not require so, an unwritten understanding between the Shia, Sunni, and Maronite leaderships in Lebanon in 1943, known as the National Pact, has resulted in the holder of the post being a Shia in every electoral cycle since that time.

== List of speakers ==
=== State of Greater Lebanon, part of the French Mandate (1922–1943) ===
==== Administrative Committee ====
The Administrative Committee was the first legislative body of Lebanon, established by the French Mandate in 1922, two years after founding the State of Greater Lebanon.

| Term | | Speaker | Political affiliation | Election |
|---|---|---|---|---|
| 1 | 4 October 1920 – 11 March 1922 | Daoud Amoun | Pro-France | 1920 |

==== Representative Councils ====
In 1922, the Representative Council of Lebanon was announced, representing different sects and areas.

| R.C. | Term | | Speaker | Political affiliation | R.C. |
|---|---|---|---|---|---|
| 1st | 2 | 25 May 1922 – 15 October 1923 | Habib Al Saad | Pro-France | 1st |
| 1st | 3 | 15 October 1923 – 21 October 1924 | Naoum Labaki | Pro-France | 1st |
| 1st | 4 | 21 October 1924 – 13 July 1925 | Emile Edde | Pro-France | 1st |
| 2nd | 5 | 13 July 1925 – 18 October 1927 | Moussa Namour | Pro-France | 2nd |

==== Senate ====
In 1926, the Senate of Lebanon was formed by the constitution, but abolished the next year.

| Term | | Portrait | Name | Political affiliation |
|---|---|---|---|---|
| 1 | 25 May 1926 – 6 October 1927 | | Mohammed al-Jisr | Pro-France |

==== Parliament ====
The Parliament was established in 1926 by the constitution, and was merged with the Senate in 1927.

| Par. | Term | | Portrait | Name | Political affiliation |
|---|---|---|---|---|---|
| 1st | (5) | 19 October 1926 – 18 October 1927 | | Moussa Namour | Pro-France |
| 1st | 6 | 18 October 1927 – 30 January 1934 | | Mohammed Aljesr | Pro-France |
| 2nd | 6 | 18 October 1927 – 30 January 1934 | | Mohammed Aljesr | Pro-France |
| 3rd | 7 | 30 January 1934 – 10 November 1934 | | Charles Debbas | Pro-France |
| 3rd | 8 | 10 November 1934 – 22 October 1935 | | Petro Trad | Pro-France |
| 3rd | 9 | 22 October 1935 – 29 October 1937 | | Khaled Chehab | Pro-France |
| 4th | 10 | 29 October 1937 – 21 September 1939 | | Petro Trad | Pro-France |

=== Lebanese Republic (1943–present) ===
==== Lebanese Parliament ====
In 1943, the Lebanese Republic was established, marking the end of the French mandate for Lebanon.

| Par. | No. | Term | Speaker | Political affiliation |
|---|---|---|---|---|
| 5th | 1 | 21 September 1943 – 22 October 1946 | Sabri Hamadé | Constitutional Bloc |
| 5th | 2 | 22 October 1946 – 9 June 1947 | Habib Abou Chahla | National Call Party |
| 6th | (1) | 9 June 1947 – 5 June 1951 | Sabri Hamadé | Constitutional Bloc |
| 7th | 3 | 5 June 1951 – 13 August 1953 | Ahmed Asaad | Al-Asaadiyya |
| 8th | 4 | 13 August 1953 – 20 October 1959 | Adel Osseiran | Unaffiliated |
| 9th | (1) | 20 October 1959 – 8 May 1964 | Sabri Hamadé | Unaffiliated |
| 10th | (1) | 20 October 1959 – 8 May 1964 | Sabri Hamadé | Unaffiliated |
| 11th | 5 | 8 May 1964 – 20 October 1964 | Kamel Asaad | Al-Asaadiyya |
| 11th | (1) | 20 October 1964 – 9 May 1968 | Sabri Hamadé | Unaffiliated |
| 12th | (5) | 9 May 1968 – 22 October 1968 | Kamel Asaad | Al-Asaadiyya |
| 12th | (1) | 22 October 1968 – 20 October 1970 | Sabri Hamadé | Unaffiliated |
| 12th | (5) | 20 October 1970 – 16 October 1984 | Kamel Asaad | Social Democratic Party |
| 13th | (5) | 20 October 1970 – 16 October 1984 | Kamel Asaad | Social Democratic Party |
| 14th | (5) | 20 October 1970 – 16 October 1984 | Kamel Asaad | Social Democratic Party |
| 15th | (5) | 20 October 1970 – 16 October 1984 | Kamel Asaad | Social Democratic Party |
| 16th | 6 | 16 October 1984 – 20 October 1992 | Hussein el-Husseini | Amal Movement |
| 17th | 6 | 16 October 1984 – 20 October 1992 | Hussein el-Husseini | Amal Movement |
| 18th | 7 | 20 October 1992 – Incumbent | Nabih Berri | Amal Movement |
| 19th | 7 | 20 October 1992 – Incumbent | Nabih Berri | Amal Movement |
| 20th | 7 | 20 October 1992 – Incumbent | Nabih Berri | Amal Movement |
| 21st | 7 | 20 October 1992 – Incumbent | Nabih Berri | Amal Movement |
| 22nd | 7 | 20 October 1992 – Incumbent | Nabih Berri | Amal Movement |
| 23rd | 7 | 20 October 1992 – Incumbent | Nabih Berri | Amal Movement |
| 24th | 7 | 20 October 1992 – Incumbent | Nabih Berri | Amal Movement |

== Birthplaces ==
| Birthplaces of speakers of the Parliament of Lebanon born in and around Lebanon. | Birthplaces speakers of the Parliament of Lebanon born abroad. |

== See also ==
- President of Lebanon
  - List of presidents of Lebanon
- Prime Minister of Lebanon
  - List of prime ministers of Lebanon
  - List of deputy prime ministers of Lebanon
- Deputy Speaker of the Parliament of Lebanon
- Lists of office-holders
