= List of members of the Senate of Lebanon =

This is a list of members of the Senate of Lebanon, established in 1926 before being abolished the next year.

Portrait	Name	Sect
	Ayoub Tabet	Minorities
	Ibrahim Haidar	Shia
	Ahmed al-Husseiny	Shia
	Albert Kachou	Maronite
	Mohammed al-Jisr	Sunni
	Mohammad al-Kasti	Sunni
	Emile Edde	Maronite
		Greek Orthodox
		Maronite
		Shia
	Sami Arslan	Druze
		Greek Catholic
	Abdallah Beyhum	Sunni
	Fadel Fadel	Sunni
		Greek Catholic
		Maronite
		Maronite
	Bechara El Khoury	Maronite
