= 1886 =

1886 in various calendars
- Gregorian calendar: 1886; MDCCCLXXXVI
- Ab urbe condita: 2639
- Armenian calendar: 1335; ԹՎ ՌՅԼԵ
- Assyrian calendar: 6636
- Baháʼí calendar: 42–43
- Balinese saka calendar: 1807–1808
- Bengali calendar: 1292–1293
- Berber calendar: 2836
- British Regnal year: 49 Vict. 1 – 50 Vict. 1
- Buddhist calendar: 2430
- Burmese calendar: 1248
- Byzantine calendar: 7394–7395
- Chinese calendar: 乙酉年 (Wood Rooster); 4583 or 4376 — to — 丙戌年 (Fire Dog); 4584 or 4377
- Coptic calendar: 1602–1603
- Discordian calendar: 3052
- Ethiopian calendar: 1878–1879
- Hebrew calendar: 5646–5647
- Hindu calendars
- Vikram Samvat: 1942–1943
- Shaka Samvat: 1807–1808
- Kali Yuga: 4986–4987
- Holocene calendar: 11886
- Igbo calendar: 886–887
- Iranian calendar: 1264–1265
- Islamic calendar: 1303–1304
- Japanese calendar: Meiji 19 (明治１９年)
- Javanese calendar: 1815–1816
- Julian calendar: Gregorian minus 12 days
- Korean calendar: 4219
- Minguo calendar: 26 before ROC 民前26年
- Nanakshahi calendar: 418
- Thai solar calendar: 2428–2429
- Tibetan calendar: ཤིང་མོ་བྱ་ལོ་ (female Wood-Bird); 2012 or 1631 or 859 — to — མེ་ཕོ་ཁྱི་ལོ་ (male Fire-Dog); 2013 or 1632 or 860

1886 (MDCCCLXXXVI) was a common year starting on Friday of the Gregorian calendar and a common year starting on Wednesday of the Julian calendar, the 1886th year of the Common Era (CE) and Anno Domini (AD) designations, the 886th year of the 2nd millennium, the 86th year of the 19th century, and the 7th year of the 1880s decade. As of the start of 1886, the Gregorian calendar was 12 days ahead of the Julian calendar, which remained in localized use until 1923.

== Events ==
=== January ===
- January 1 – Upper Burma is formally annexed to British Burma, following its conquest in the Third Anglo-Burmese War of November 1885.
- January 5–9 – Robert Louis Stevenson's novella Strange Case of Dr Jekyll and Mr Hyde is published in New York and London.
- January 16 – A resolution is passed in the German Parliament to condemn the Prussian deportations, the politically motivated mass expulsion of ethnic Poles and Jews from Prussia, initiated by Otto von Bismarck.
- January 18 – Modern field hockey is born with the formation of The Hockey Association in England.
- January 29 – Karl Benz patents the first successful gasoline-driven automobile, the Benz Patent-Motorwagen (built in 1885).

=== February ===
- February 6–9 – Seattle riot of 1886: Anti-Chinese sentiments result in riots in Seattle, Washington.
- February 8 – The West End Riots following a popular meeting in Trafalgar Square, London.
- February 11 – The Anti-Chinese League of the City of Napa, California, is formed.
- February 14 – The first trainload of oranges leaves Los Angeles via the United States transcontinental railroad.

=== March ===
- March 1 – The Anglo-Chinese School is founded by Bishop William Fitzjames Oldham at Amoy Street in Singapore.
- March 3 – The Treaty of Bucharest ends the Serbo-Bulgarian War in the Balkans.
- March 11 - Anandi Gopal Joshi becomes the first Indian-born woman to graduate from medical school.
- March 16 – A law establishing the Kiel Canal is adopted in the German Empire.
- March 17 – A white mob storms a courthouse in Carroll County, Mississippi, killing 23 African Americans.
- March 20 – William Stanley Jr. demonstrates the first commercial alternating current generator and transformer system in Great Barrington, Massachusetts.
- March 23 – Tchaikovsky’s Manfred symphony premieres in Moscow, Russia.
- March 29 – Wilhelm Steinitz becomes the first recognized World Chess Champion.
- March – Gottlieb Daimler assembles his first automobile, in Germany.

=== April ===
- April 4 – William Ewart Gladstone introduces the First Irish Home Rule Bill in the Parliament of the United Kingdom; it is defeated on June 8.
- April 6 – The settlement of Vancouver, British Columbia, is incorporated.
- April 24 – Father Augustine Tolton, the first Roman Catholic priest from the United States to identify himself publicly as African American, is ordained in Rome.
- April – The Swedish Dress Reform Society is established.

=== May ===
May 8: Coca-Cola invented.

- May 1 – A general strike begins in the United States, which escalates on May 4 into the Haymarket affair in Chicago, and eventually wins the eight-hour day for workers.
- May 4 – Emile Berliner starts work that leads to the invention of the gramophone.
- May 8 – American pharmacist Dr. John Pemberton invents a carbonated beverage that will be named 'Coca-Cola'.
- May 10 – Santa Clara County v. Southern Pacific Railroad: The U.S. Supreme Court rules that corporations have the same rights as living persons.
- May 15 – Portugal and France agree to regulate the borders of their colonies in Guinea.
- May 17 – Motherwell Football Club is founded in Scotland.
- May 29 – John Pemberton begins to advertise Coca-Cola (in The Atlanta Journal).

=== June ===
- June 2 – U.S. President Grover Cleveland marries Frances Folsom in the White House (Washington, D.C.), becoming the only President of the United States to wed in the executive mansion. She is 27 years his junior.
- June 3 – Uganda Martyrs: Charles Lwanga, 12 other Catholic boys and men, and 9 Anglicans, are burned (and another Catholic speared) to death, at the orders of Kabaka Mwanga II of Buganda in Namugongo.

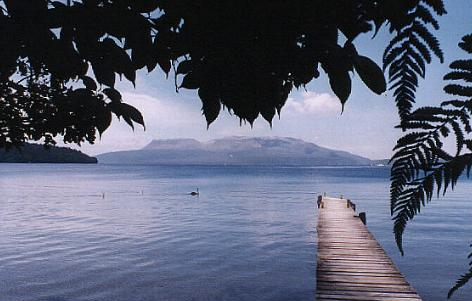
June 10: Mount Tarawera erupts.

- June 10 – The Mount Tarawera volcano erupts in New Zealand, resulting in the deaths of over 150 people and the destruction of the famous Pink and White Terraces.
- June 12 – King Ludwig II of Bavaria is detained as part of a deposition, drowning the following day under mysterious circumstances. Because his brother Otto lacks mental capacity, their uncle Luitpold (until 1912) serves as regent. Six weeks later, Ludwig's unfinished Neuschwanstein Castle is opened to the public.
- June 13
  - The Great Vancouver Fire devastates much of Vancouver, British Columbia.
  - A large log jam forms on the St. Croix River near Taylors Falls, Minnesota
- June 25 – Arturo Toscanini makes his conducting debut, with an Italian opera company visiting Rio de Janeiro.
- June 30 – The Royal Holloway College for women is opened by Queen Victoria, near London, England.

=== July ===
- July 3 – Karl Benz officially unveils the Benz Patent Motorwagen.
- July 9 – American inventor Charles Martin Hall files a patent for his inexpensive method of refining aluminium (discovered on February 23); independently and near-simultaneously discovered in France by Paul Héroult it becomes known as the Hall–Héroult process.
- July 23 – Steve Brodie is reported to have made a jump from the Brooklyn Bridge, a claim subsequently disputed.
- July 25 – Robert Cecil, 3rd Marquess of Salisbury becomes Prime Minister of the United Kingdom.

=== August ===
- August 13 – Nagasaki Incident: Chinese troops riot during shore leave in Nagasaki, Japan.
- August 19 – The Christian Union (Church of God) is established in Monroe County, Tennessee
- August 20 – A massive hurricane demolishes the town of Indianola, Texas.
- August 31 – The 7.0 M_{w} Charleston earthquake affects southeastern South Carolina, with a maximum Mercalli intensity of X (Extreme); 60 people are killed, and damage is estimated at $5–6 million.

=== September ===
- September 1 – Grasshopper Club Zürich is founded as the first football club in the Swiss city of Zürich by English students.
- September 4 – American Indian Wars: After almost 30 years of fighting, Apache leader Geronimo surrenders, with his last band of warriors, to General Nelson Miles, at Skeleton Canyon in Arizona.
- September 9 – The Berne Convention for the Protection of Literary and Artistic Works is signed.
- September 21 – American physicist William Stanley Jr. patents the first practical alternating current transformer device, the induction coil.
- September – Avon Products, a worldwide cosmetics and household brand is founded by David H. McConnell in New York City, United States.

=== October ===
- October 7 – Spain abolishes slavery in Cuba.
- October 24 – The British merchant vessel Normanton sinks off the coast of Japan, triggering the Normanton incident.
- October 28 – U.S. President Grover Cleveland dedicates the Statue of Liberty, a gift from France, in New York Harbor. The ensuing spontaneous celebration in New York City leads to the first ticker tape parade.

=== November ===
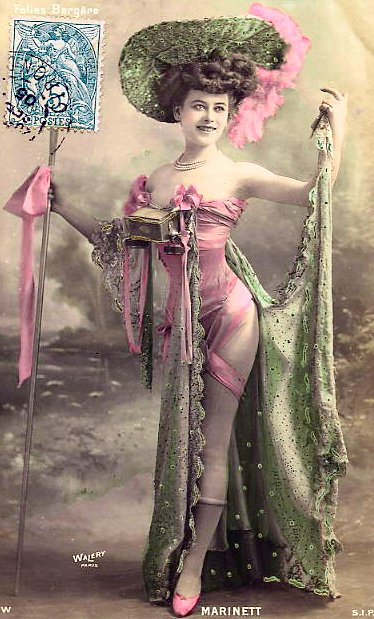
November 30: Folies Bergère.

- November 1 – The biggest Buddhist boys' school in Sri Lanka, Ananda College, is founded in Colombo.
- November 3 – In the British Raj, what will become one of the biggest boys' schools in Pakistan, Aitchison College, Lahore, is founded under the auspices of Sir Charles Umpherston Aitchison.
- November 11 – Heinrich Hertz verifies the existence of electromagnetic waves, at the University of Karlsruhe.
- November 14 – German inventor Friedrich Soennecken first develops the hole puncher, a type of office tool capable of punching small holes in paper.
- November 15 – The Werkstätte für Feinmechanik und Elektrotechnik (Workshop for Fine Mechanics and Electronics) is founded in Baden-Württemberg, Germany by Robert Bosch. The company will later become the home appliance and power tool brand, Robert Bosch GmbH.
- November 30 – The Folies Bergère stages its first revue in Paris.
- November – The extremely harsh winter of 1886–87 in the United States begins, killing tens of thousands of cattle on the Great Plains of North America.

=== December ===
- December 11 – London Association football club Arsenal, founded as Dial Square by workers at the Royal Arsenal in Woolwich, play their first match (on the Isle of Dogs). The club is renamed Royal Arsenal soon afterwards, supposedly on December 25.
- December 17 – English adventurer Thomas Stevens concludes the first circumnavigation by bicycle in Yokohama, having set out on his penny-farthing from San Francisco in 1884.

=== Date unknown ===
- Addis Ababa is founded in the Ethiopian Empire.
- The village of Skorenovac is founded in Serbia, mostly by Székely Hungarians.
- Scotch whisky distiller William Grant & Sons is founded.
- Yorkshire Tea is established in Harrogate, England.
- Johnson & Johnson, which becomes a multinational brand, begins manufacturing healthcare products in New Jersey, United States.
- Food product and processing brand Del Monte is founded in California, United States.
- Emily Ruete publishes her landmark memoir, Memoirs of an Arabian Princess: An Autobiography.
- Bedford Rugby Club is formed in England.

== Births ==
=== January–February ===
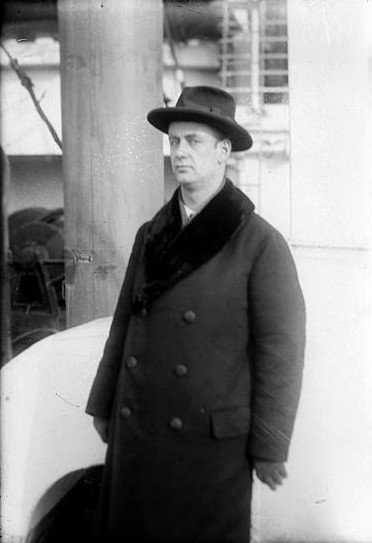
Wilhelm Furtwängler

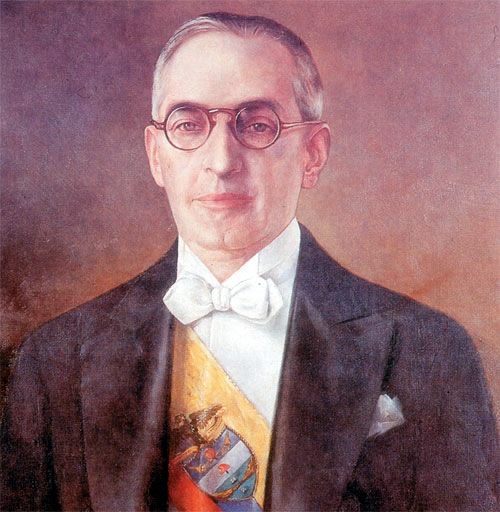
Alfonso López Pumarejo

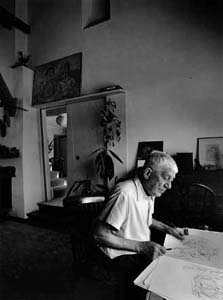
Oskar Kokoschka

- January 2
  - Apsley Cherry-Garrard, English polar explorer with the Terra Nova expedition and author of The Worst Journey in the World (d. 1959)
  - Florence Lawrence, Canadian-born American actress (d. 1938)
  - Elise Ottesen-Jensen, Norwegian-Swedish feminist (d. 1973)
- January 5 – Markus Reiner, Israeli scientist (d. 1976)
- January 7 – Amedeo Maiuri, Italian archaeologist (d. 1963)
- January 11
  - George Zucco, English–born American character actor (d. 1960)
  - Chester Conklin, American actor (d. 1971)
- January 13 – Sophie Tucker, Russian-born American singer, comedian (d. 1966)
- January 14 – Hugh Lofting, English-born American author (d. 1947)
- January 17 – Joe Masseria, Italian-born American gangster (d. 1931)
- January 25 – Wilhelm Furtwängler, German conductor (d. 1954)
- January 27 – Frank Nitti, Italian-born American gangster (d. 1943)
- January 28 – Hidetsugu Yagi, Japanese electrical engineer (d. 1976)
- January 31 – Alfonso López Pumarejo, 14th and 16th President of Colombia (d. 1959)
- February 2 – Frank Lloyd, English-born American film director, scriptwriter and producer (d. 1960)
- February 4 – Edward Sheldon, American playwright (d. 1946)
- February 7 – Yehezkel Abramsky, Russian-born British rabbi (d. 1976)
- February 8 – Charlie Ruggles, American actor (d. 1970)
- February 12 – Margarita Fischer, American silent film actress (d. 1975)
- February 19 – José Abad Santos, Filipino jurist, lawyer (d. 1942)
- February 27 – Hugo Black, Associate Justice of the Supreme Court of the United States (d. 1971)

=== March–April ===
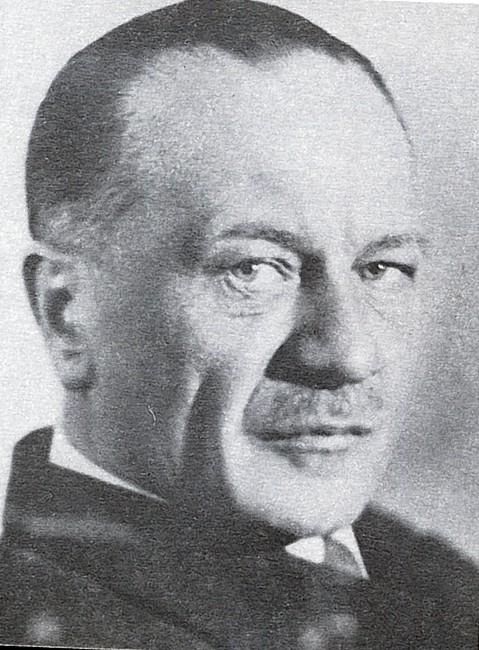
Kazimierz Świtalski

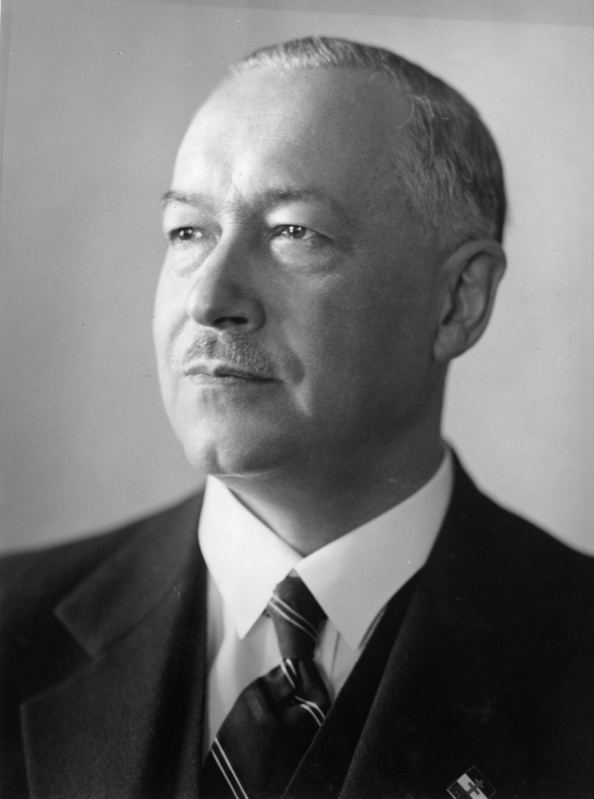
Kálmán Darányi

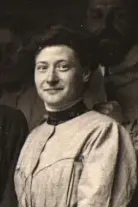
Suzanne Veil

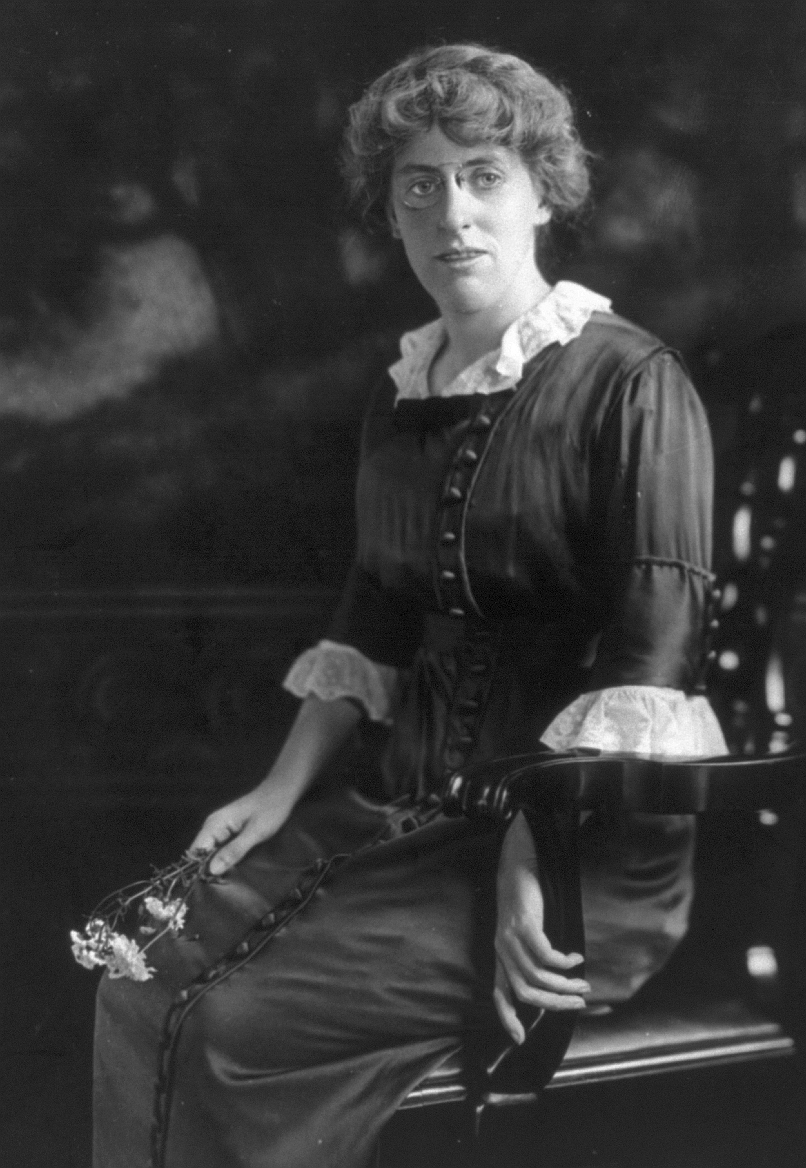
Margaret Woodrow Wilson

- March 1 – Oskar Kokoschka, Austrian-born painter (d. 1980)
- March 2
  - Vittorio Pozzo, Italian football player and manager (d. 1968)
  - Leo Geyr von Schweppenburg, German general (d. 1974)
  - Willis H. O'Brien, American stop motion animator, Academy Award winner (d. 1962)
- March 3
  - R. O. Morris, British composer (d. 1948)
  - James Friskin, Scottish-American pianist and composer (d. 1967)
  - Tore Ørjasæter, Norwegian poet (d. 1968)
- March 4 – Kazimierz Świtalski, Polish diplomat, politician, soldier and military officer, 18th Prime Minister of Poland (d. 1962)
- March 5
  - Dong Biwu, acting Chairman of China, communist revolutionary (d. 1975)
  - Paul Radmilovic, Welsh Olympic medallist in water polo and swimming (d. 1968)
- March 6
  - Saburō Kurusu, Japanese diplomat (d. 1954)
  - Nella Walker, American actress, vaudevillian (d. 1971)
- March 7
  - Virginia Pearson, American silent film actress (d. 1958)
  - René Thomas, French racing driver (d. 1975)
- March 8 – Edward Calvin Kendall, American chemist, recipient of the Nobel Prize in Physiology or Medicine (d. 1972)
- March 9 – Robert L. Eichelberger, American general (d. 1961)
- March 11 – Edward Rydz-Śmigły, Polish politician, Marshal of Poland (d. 1941)
- March 13 – John “Home Run” Baker, American baseball player, Hall of Famer (d. 1963)
- March 14 – Firmin Lambot, Belgian cyclist (d. 1964)
- March 17 – Princess Patricia of Connaught, granddaughter of Queen Victoria (d. 1974)
- March 18
  - Edward Everett Horton, American actor (d. 1970)
  - Lothar von Arnauld de la Perière, German U-boat ace (d. 1941)
  - Kurt Koffka, German psychologist (d. 1941)
  - Marianne Philips, Dutch author and politician (d. 1951)
- March 19 – Giuseppe Mario Bellanca, Italian-born American airplane designer, manufacturer (d. 1960)
- March 22 – Kálmán Darányi, 31st Prime Minister of Hungary (d. 1939)
- March 24 – Edward Weston, American photographer (d. 1958)
- March 25 – Patriarch Athenagoras I of Constantinople (d. 1972)
- March 27
  - Ludwig Mies van der Rohe, German architect (d. 1969)
  - Sergei Kirov, Russian politician, Bolshevik revolutionary (d. 1934)
- March 30 – Stanisław Leśniewski, Polish mathematician and philosopher (d. 1939)
- April 4 – William R. Munroe, American admiral (d. 1966)
- April 5 – Gustavo Jiménez, President of Peru (d. 1933)
- April 14 – Ernst Robert Curtius, Alsatian philologist (d. 1956)
- April 16
  - Ernst Thälmann, German Communist leader (d. 1944)
  - Margaret Woodrow Wilson, American singer; Presidential daughter (d. 1944)
- April 26 – Ma Rainey, American singer (d. 1939)
- April 28 - Suzanne Veil, French chemical engineer and translator (d. 1956)
- April 30 – Dick Elliott, American actor (d. 1961)

=== May–June ===
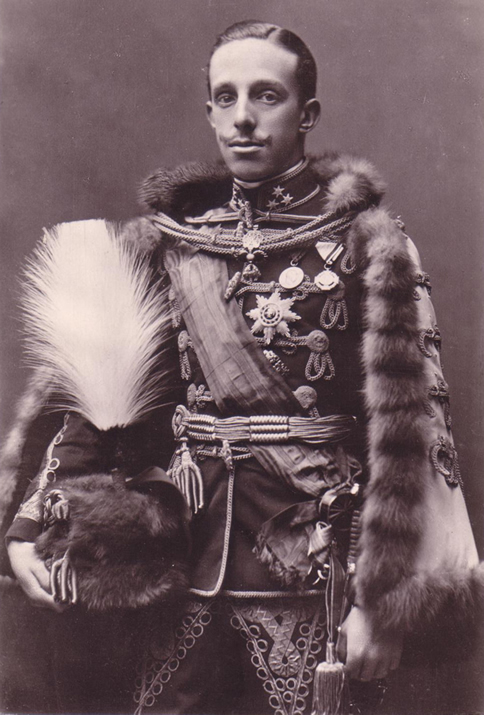
King Alfonso XIII of Spain

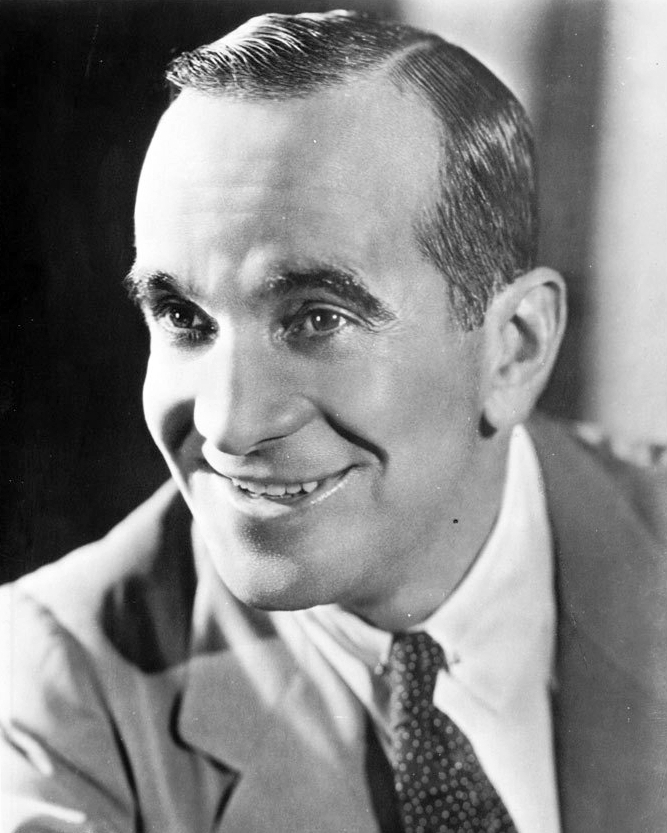
Al Jolson

- May 2 – Gottfried Benn, German poet (d. 1956)
- May 3 – Marcel Dupré, French composer (d. 1971)
- May 5 – Émile Eddé, 4th Prime Minister and 3rd President of Lebanon (d. 1949)
- May 10
  - Karl Barth, Swiss Protestant theologian (d. 1968)
  - Felix Manalo, Filipino Executive Minister (Tagapamahalang Pangkalahatan) of the Iglesia ni Cristo (d. 1963)
  - Olaf Stapledon, British author, philosopher (d. 1950)
- May 17 – King Alfonso XIII of Spain (d. 1941)
- May 18 – Ture Nerman, Swedish communist leader (d. 1969)
- May 20 – John Jacob Astor, 1st Baron Astor of Hever, American-born British businessman (d. 1971)
- May 26 – Al Jolson, American entertainer (d. 1950)
- June 6 – William A. Glassford, American admiral (d. 1958)
- June 7 – Henri Coandă, Romanian aerodynamics pioneer (d. 1972)
- June 9 – Kosaku Yamada, Japanese composer, conductor (d. 1965)
- June 18 – George Mallory, English climber (d. 1924)
- June 24 – Ion Gigurtu, 42nd Prime Minister of Romania (d. 1959)
- June 25 – Henry H. Arnold, American general, aviation pioneer (d. 1950)
- June 28 – Hitoshi Imamura, Japanese general (d. 1968)
- June 29 – Robert Schuman, German-French politician, a founding father of the European Union (d. 1963)

=== July–August ===
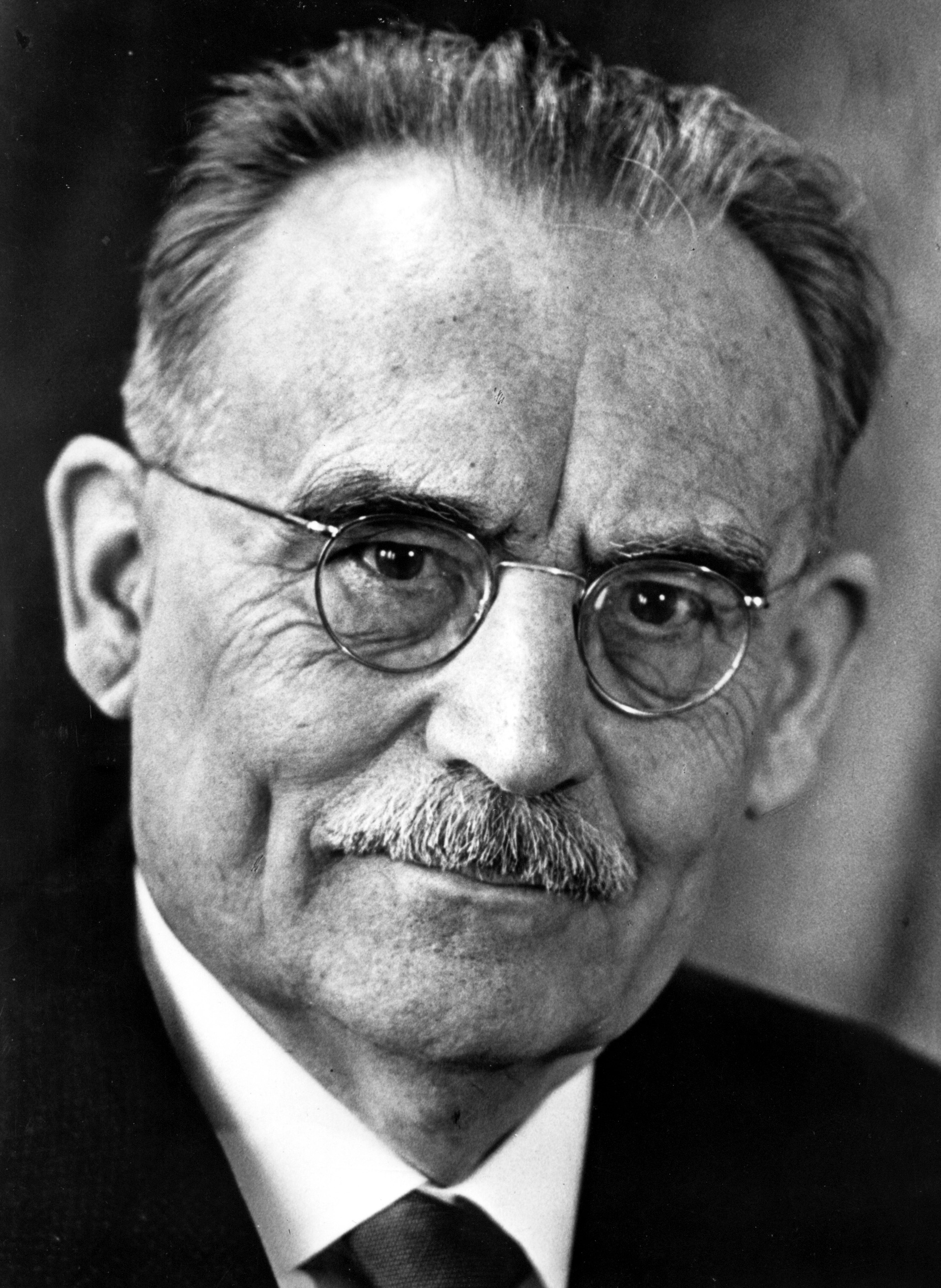
Willem Drees

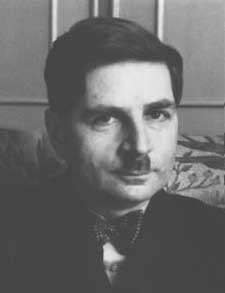
Walter H. Schottky

- July 3
  - Giovanni Battista Caproni, Italian aeronautical, civil, and electrical engineer, aircraft designer, and industrialist (d. 1957)
  - Raymond A. Spruance, American admiral, ambassador (d. 1969)
- July 5 – Willem Drees, Dutch politician and historian, 30th Prime Minister of the Netherlands (d. 1988)
- July 6 – Lou Skuce, Canadian cartoonist (d. 1951)
- July 12 – Jean Hersholt, Danish-born American actor (d. 1956)
- July 18 – Simon Bolivar Buckner Jr., American general (d. 1945)
- July 19 – Marthe Condat, French physician (d. 1939)
- July 23 – Walter H. Schottky, German physicist (d. 1976)
- July 24 – Jun'ichirō Tanizaki, Japanese writer (d. 1965)
- July 25 – Bror von Blixen-Finecke, Swedish big-game hunter (d. 1946)
- July 31 – Fred Quimby, American film producer (d. 1965)
- August 2 – John Alexander Douglas McCurdy, Canadian aviation pioneer, Lieutenant Governor of Nova Scotia (d. 1961)
- August 6
  - Florence Goodenough, American child psychologist (d. 1959)
  - Inez Milholland, American suffragist, labor lawyer, World War I correspondent and public speaker (d. 1916)
- August 12 – Campbell Tait, British admiral and Governor of Southern Rhodesia (d. 1946)
- August 20 – Paul Tillich, German-American Christian existentialist philosopher, theologian (d. 1965)
- August 26 – Ceferino Namuncurá, Argentine Roman Catholic lay brother and blessed (d. 1905)
- August 27
  - Nicolette Bruining, Dutch theologian, humanitarian (d. 1963)
  - Rebecca Clarke, English composer, violist (d. 1979)
  - Eric Coates, English composer (d. 1957)

=== September–October ===
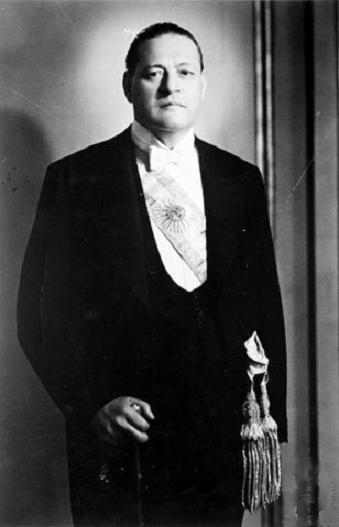
Roberto María Ortiz

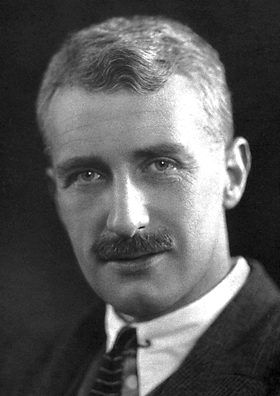
Archibald Hill

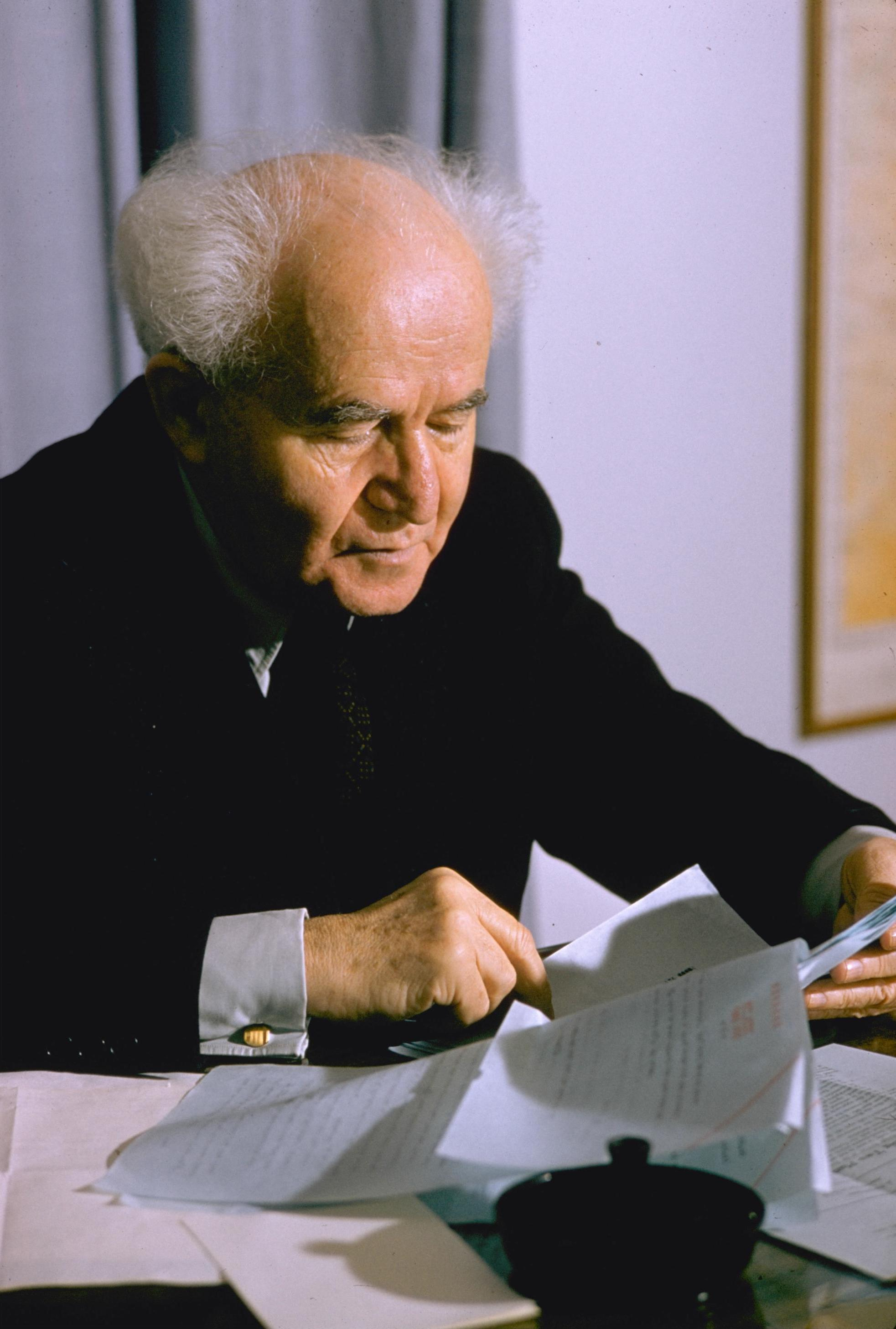
David Ben-Gurion

- September 1
  - Tarsila do Amaral, Brazilian modernist painter (d. 1973)
  - Othmar Schoeck, Swiss composer (d. 1957)
- September 5 – Nell Brinkley, American illustrator, comic artist (d. 1944)
- September 8 – Siegfried Sassoon, British poet (d. 1967)
- September 11 – Khaled Chehab, twice Prime Minister of Lebanon (d. 1978)
- September 13 – Robert Robinson, British chemist, Nobel Prize laureate (d. 1975)
- September 14 – Jan Masaryk, Foreign Minister of Czechoslovakia (d. 1948)
- September 16 – Jean Arp, Alsatian sculptor, painter and poet (d. 1966)
- September 20 – Charles Williams, English novelist, playwright, poet, theologian and critic (d. 1945)
- September 24
  - Edward Bach, English metaphysician, homeopath (d. 1936)
  - Roberto María Ortiz, President of Argentina (d. 1942)
- September 25 – Nobutake Kondō, Japanese admiral (d. 1953)
- September 26 – Archibald Hill, English physiologist, Nobel Prize laureate (d. 1977)
- September 30 – Wilhelm Marschall, German admiral (d. 1976)
- October 3 – Alain-Fournier, French writer (killed in action 1914)
- October 6 – Edwin Fischer, Swiss pianist, conductor (d. 1960)
- October 11 – Conrad Helfrich, Dutch admiral (d. 1962)
- October 14 – Salvador Moreno Fernández, Spanish admiral and politician (d. 1966)
- October 15 – Jonas H. Ingram, American admiral (d. 1952)
- October 16 – David Ben-Gurion, Polish-born first Prime Minister of Israel (d. 1973)
- October 17 – Spring Byington, American actress (d. 1971)
- October 22 – Oscar Griswold, American general (d. 1959)
- October 30 – Zoë Akins, American playwright, poet and author (d. 1958)

=== November–December ===
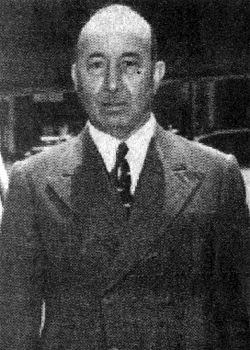
Ali Jawdat al-Aiyubi

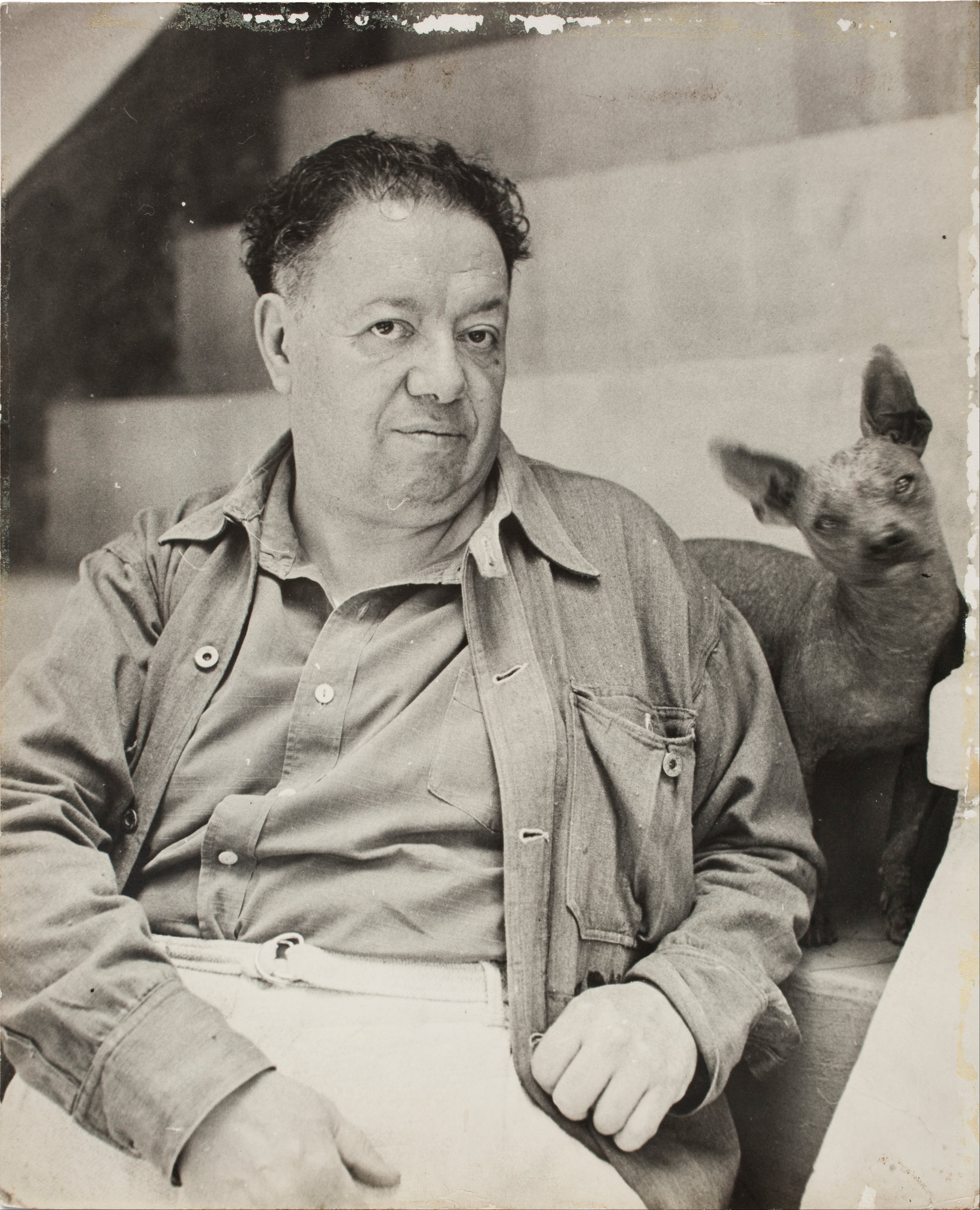
Diego Rivera

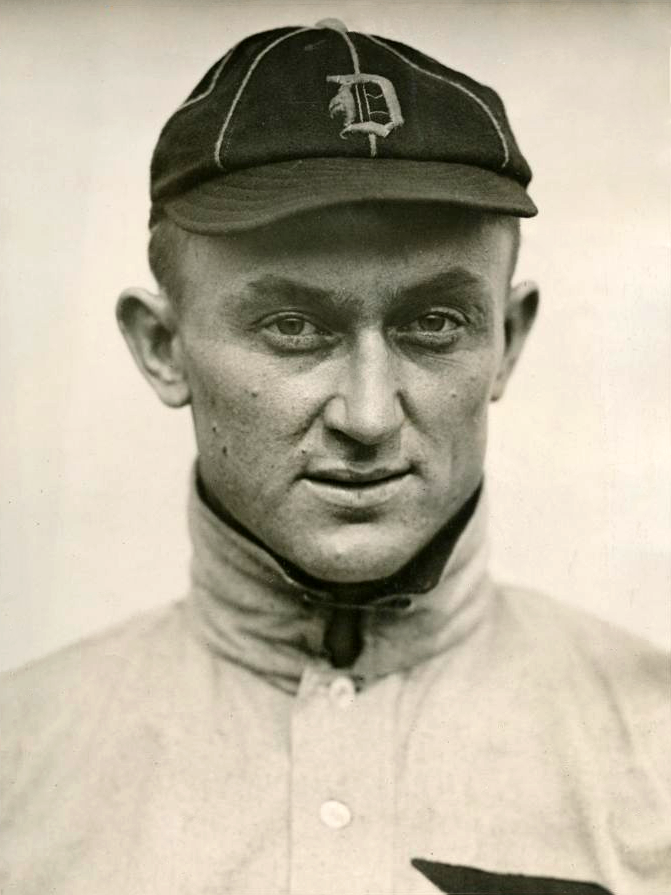
Ty Cobb

- November 1 – Hermann Broch, Austrian author (d. 1951)
- November 2 – Gheorghe Tătărescu, 2-time prime minister of Romania (d. 1957)
- November 6 – André Marty, French Communist Party leader (d. 1956)
- November 9 – Ed Wynn, American actor (d. 1966)
- November 10 – Walden L. Ainsworth, American admiral (d. 1960)
- November 11 – Ali Jawdat al-Aiyubi, 11th Prime Minister of Iraq (d. 1969)
- November 12 – Infante Alfonso, Duke of Galliera, Spanish prince, military aviator (d. 1975)
- November 15 – René Guénon, French-Egyptian author (d. 1951)
- November 18 – Ferenc Münnich, 47th Prime Minister of Hungary (d. 1967)
- November 20 – Karl von Frisch, Austrian zoologist, recipient of the Nobel Prize in Physiology or Medicine (d. 1982)
- November 26 – Margaret C. Anderson, American publisher, editor (d. 1973)
- December 2 – Lester P. Barlow, American inventor and engineer (d. 1967)
- December 3 – Manne Siegbahn, Swedish physicist, Nobel Prize laureate (d. 1978)
- December 5
  - Masakazu Kawabe, Japanese general (d. 1965)
  - Rose Wilder Lane, American author (d. 1968)
- December 8 – Diego Rivera, Mexican painter (d. 1957)
- December 10 – Victor McLaglen, English actor, boxer (d. 1959)
- December 12 – Owen Moore, Irish-born American actor (d. 1939)
- December 18 – Ty Cobb, American baseball player and a member of the Baseball Hall of Fame (d. 1961)
- December 25
  - Gotthard Heinrici, German general (d. 1971)
  - Kid Ory, American jazz musician (d. 1973)
- December 26 – Gyula Gömbös, 30th Prime Minister of Hungary (d. 1936)
- December 30 – Austin Osman Spare, English artist, magician (d. 1956)

=== Unknown ===
- Gabriel of Dionysiou -Greek Orthodod Archimandrite in Mount Athos (d. 1983)
- Cola Nicea, Aromanian soldier (d. unknown)
- Petro Trad, 5th President and 14th Prime Minister of Lebanon (d. 1947)

== Deaths ==
=== January–June ===
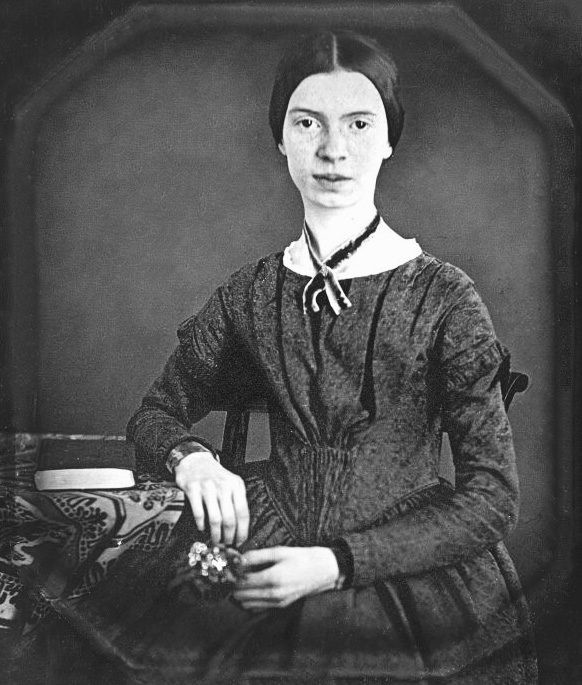
Emily Dickinson

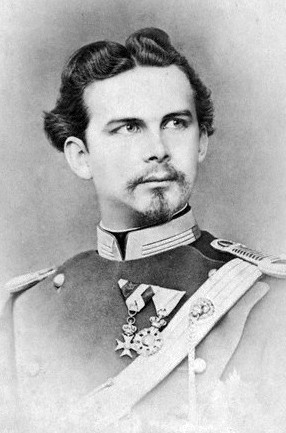
Ludwig II of Bavaria

- January 16 – Amilcare Ponchielli, Italian composer (b. 1834)
- January 18 – Baldassare Verazzi, Italian painter (b. 1819)
- January 26 – David Rice Atchison, American politician (b. 1807)
- February 9 – Winfield Scott Hancock, Union general of the American Civil War, Democratic political candidate (b. 1824)
- February 10 – Laura Don, American actress (b. 1852)
- February 12 – Horatio Seymour, 18th Governor of New York, 1868 Democratic Party presidential nominee (b. 1810)
- February 15 – Edward Cardwell, 1st Viscount Cardwell, British politician (b. 1813)
- February 18 – Dave Rudabaugh, American outlaw, gunfighter (b. 1854)
- February 24 – Hugh Stowell Brown, Manx preacher (b. 1823)
- March 9 – William S. Clark, American chemist, agricultural educator (b. 1826)
- March 17
  - Pierre-Jules Hetzel, French editor, publisher (b. 1814)
  - Leopold Zunz, German scholar of Judaism (b. 1794)
- March 29 – John Keble, English Anglican priest and poet (b. 1792)
- March 30 – Joseph-Alfred Mousseau, sixth premier of Quebec (b. 1837)
- March 31 – Giovanni Rossi, Italian composer (b. 1828)
- March – Harriet Bates, American author (b. 1856)
- April 9 – Joseph Victor von Scheffel, German poet (b. 1826)
- April 16 – Andrew Nicholl, Northern Irish painter (b. 1804)
- April 20 – Louis Melsens, Belgian chemist and physicist (b. 1814)
- April 27 – Henry Hobson Richardson, American architect (b. 1838)
- May 9 – Facundo Bacardí, Cuban rum manufacturer (b. 1814)
- May 15 – Emily Dickinson, American poet (b. 1830)
- May 17 – John Deere, American inventor (b. 1804)
- May 23 – Leopold von Ranke, German historian (b. 1795)
- June 13
  - Bernhard von Gudden, German neuroanatomist and psychiatrist (b. 1824)
  - King Ludwig II of Bavaria (b. 1845)
- June 19 – Sir Charles Trevelyan, British civil servant and colonial administrator (b. 1807)
- June 21 – Daniel Dunglas Home, Scottish medium (b. 1833)

=== July–December ===
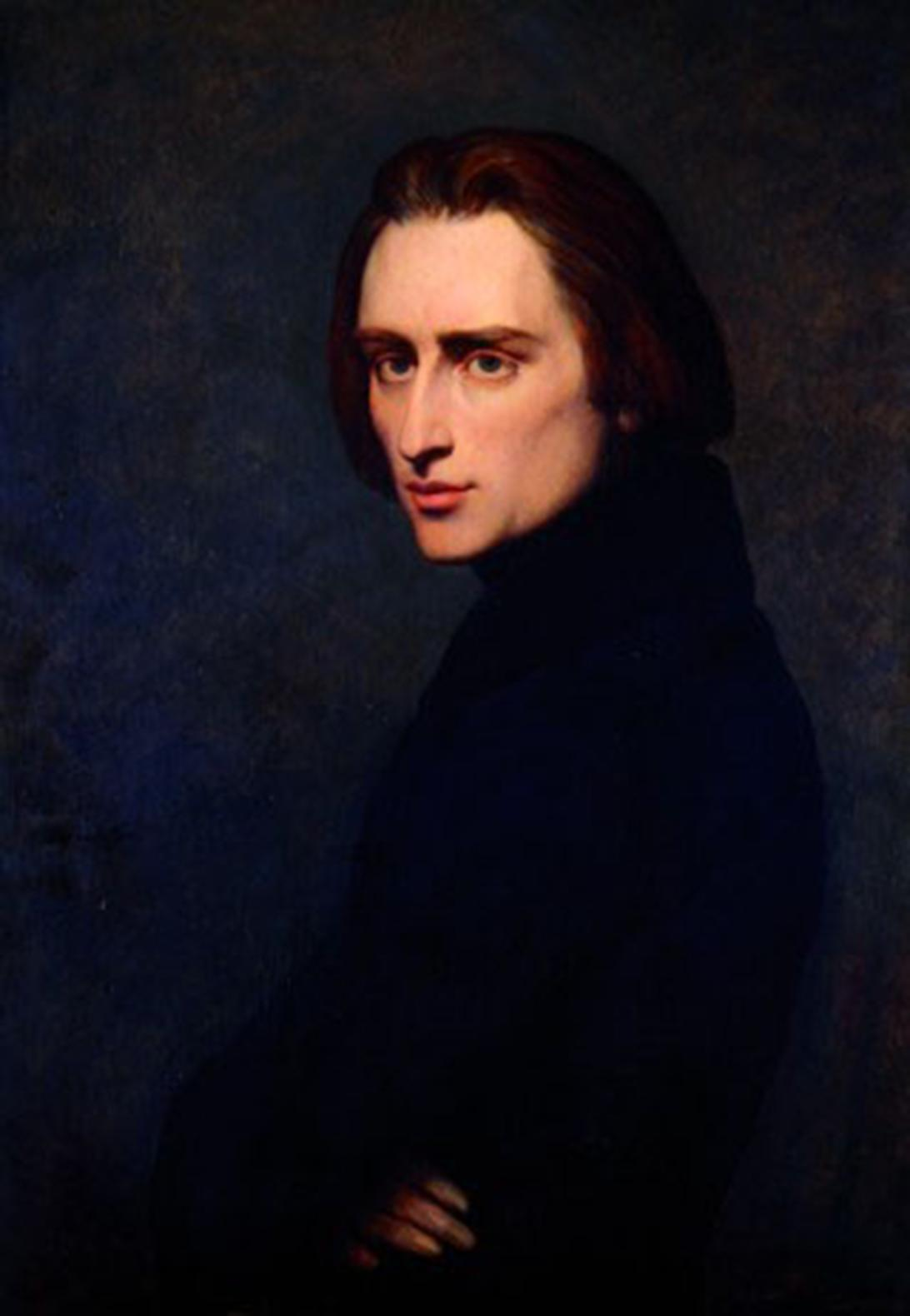
Franz Liszt

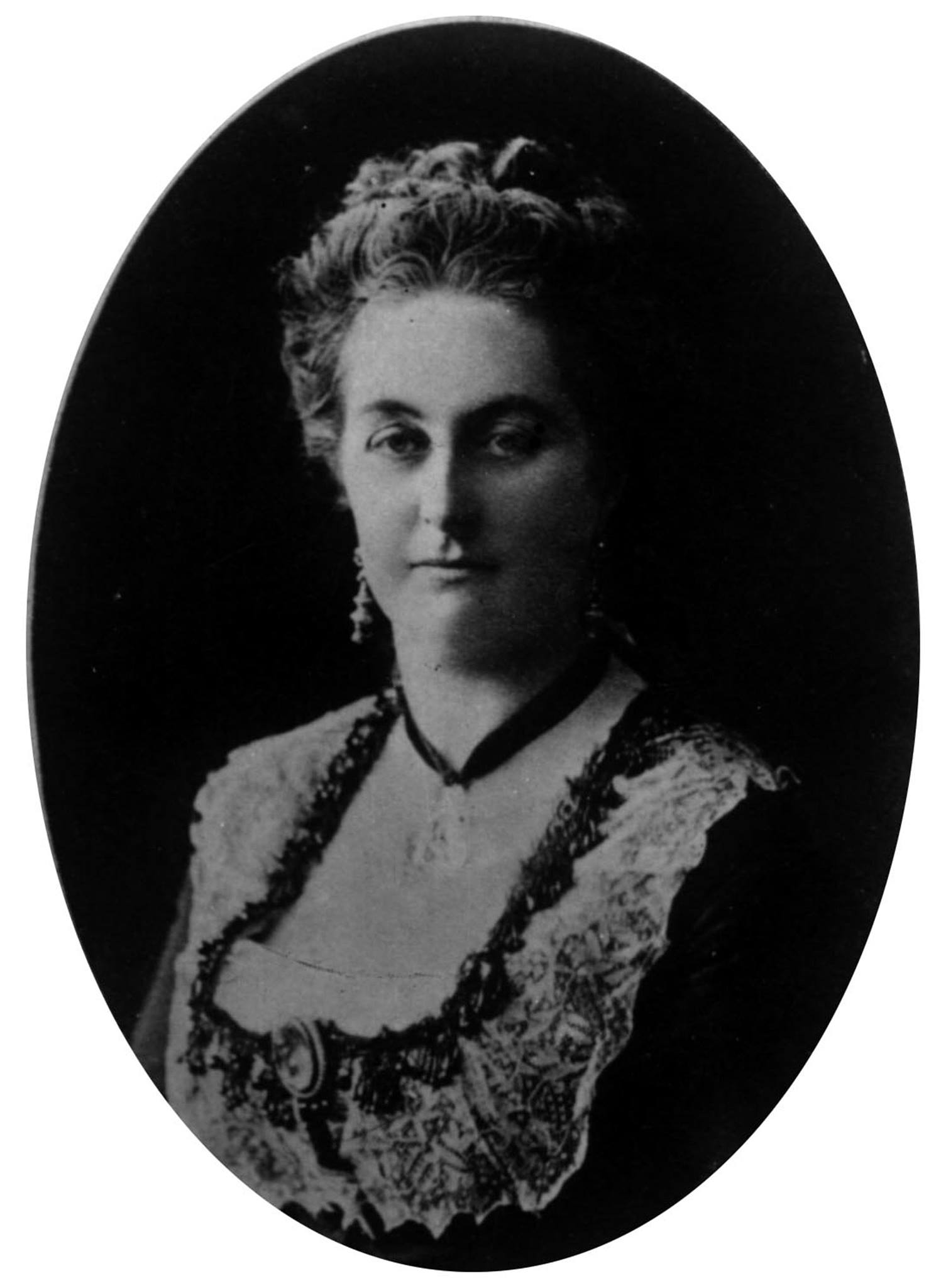
Eliza Lynch

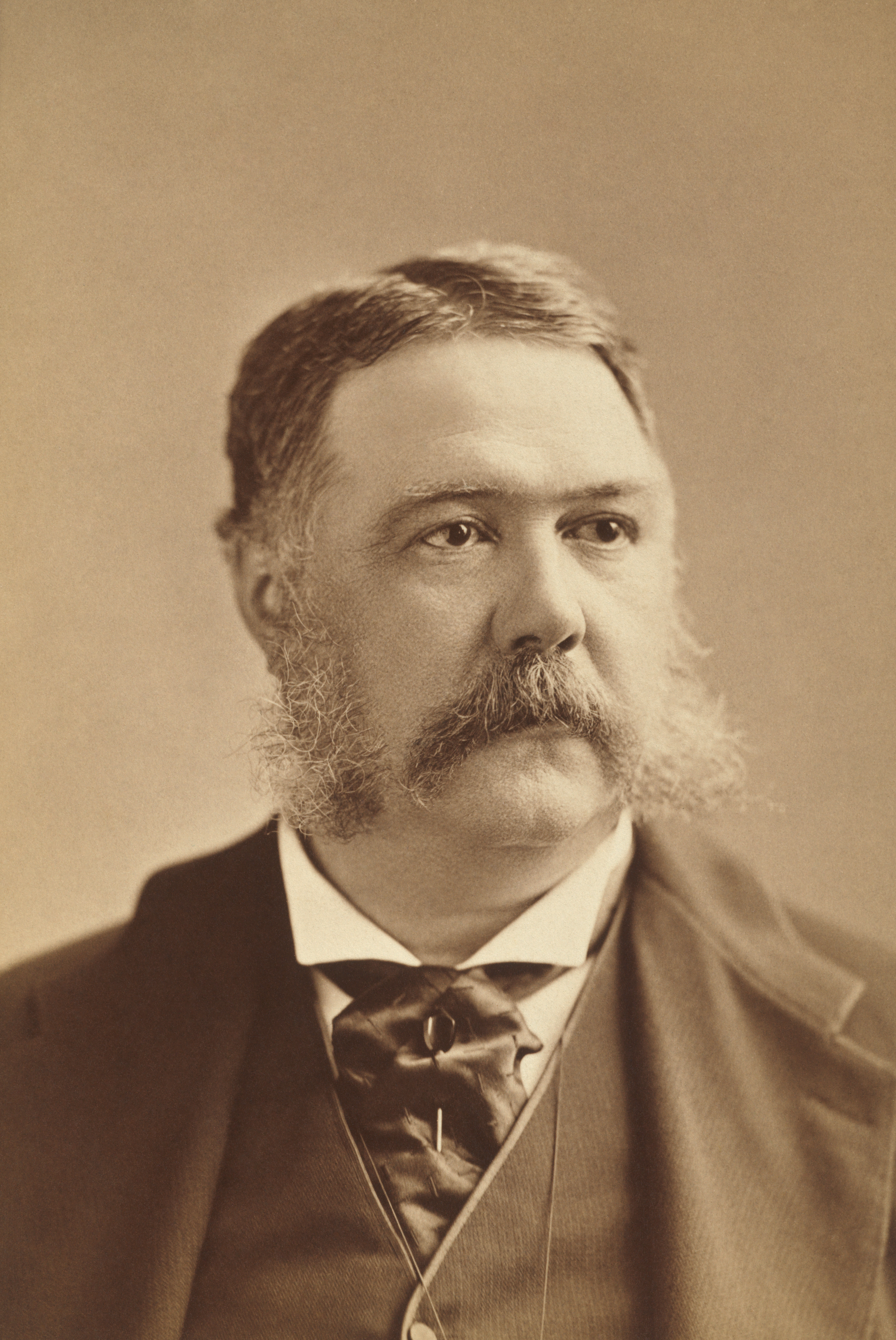
Chester A. Arthur

- July 1 – Otto Wilhelm Hermann von Abich, German geologist (b. 1806)
- July 4
  - Poundmaker, Aboriginal Canadian leader (b. c. 1842)
  - Prince Arisugawa Takahito, Japanese Prince (b. 1813)
- July 16 – Ned Buntline (Edward Zane Carroll Judson Sr.), American publisher, dime novelist and publicist (b. 1821)
- July 25 – Eliza Lynch, First Lady of Paraguay (b. 1833)
- July 31 – Franz Liszt, Hungarian pianist, composer (b. 1811)
- August 4 – Samuel J. Tilden, 25th Governor of New York, 1876 Democratic Party presidential nominee (b. 1814)
- August 9
  - Sir Samuel Ferguson, Northern Irish poet, artist (b. 1810)
  - Bill Smith, Major League Baseball player (b. 1865)
- August 11 – Lydia Koidula, Estonian poet (b. 1843)
- August 16 – Ramakrishna Paramhansa, Indian spiritual figure (b. 1836)
- August 30 – Ferris Jacobs Jr., American politician (b. 1836)
- September 3 – William W. Snow, American politician (b. 1812)
- September 4 – Benjamin F. Cheatham, Confederate general (b. 1820)
- September 14 – Gurdon Saltonstall Hubbard, American land speculator (b. 1802)
- September 25 – Hannah T. King, British-born American writer and pioneer (b. 1808)
- October 6 – Edward William Godwin, English architect (b. 1833)
- October 8 – Austin F. Pike, American politician from New Hampshire (b. 1819)
- October 9 – Jean-Jacques Uhrich, French general (b. 1802)
- October 10 – David Levy Yulee, American politician, US Senator from Florida (b. 1810)
- November 4 – Sir James Martin, 4th Premier of New South Wales (b. 1820)
- November 18 – Chester A. Arthur, 21st President of the United States (b. 1829)
- November 20 – William Bliss Baker, American painter (b. 1859)
- November 21 – Charles Francis Adams Sr., American historical editor, politician and diplomat (b. 1807)
- December 8
  - Isaac Lea, American conchologist, geologist and publisher (b. 1792)
  - William Fraser Tolmie, Scottish-Canadian scientist, politician (b. 1812)
- December 16 – Josef Drásal, the tallest Czech (b. 1841)
- December 26 – John A. Logan, American soldier, political leader (b. 1826)
