= 1927 Lebanese general election =

- 1927

General elections were held in Lebanon in 1927. The new Parliament had 46 members, and was formed by adding 16 elected members to the 30 elected members from the previous Representative Council.

== Results ==
=== Elected members ===
Province	Ethnic group seat	Elected members
Beirut	Greek Catholics	Salim Najjar
Beirut	Greek Orthodox	Nakhleh Tweini
Beirut	Maronite	Émile Eddé
Beirut	Maronite	Albert Kashou'h
Beirut	Minorities	Ayoub Tabet
Beirut	Sunni	Abdallah Bayhum
Beirut	Sunni	Cheikh Mohammad al-Kasti
Mount Lebanon	Druze	Sami Arslan
Mount Lebanon	Maronite	Habib Pacha Es-Saad
Mount Lebanon	Maronite	Bechara El Khoury
Mount Lebanon	Shi'ite	Ahmad al-Huseini
North Lebanon	Greek Orthodox	Jubran Nahhas
North Lebanon	Maronite	Yousef Estphan
South Lebanon	Shi'ite	Fadl al-Fadl
South Lebanon	Shi'ite	Hussein al-Zein
Tripoli	Sunni	Cheikh Mohammad al-Jisr

== See also ==
- List of members of the 1st Lebanese Parliament
