= Fifth cabinet of Khayreddin Ahdab =

The fifth cabinet of Khayreddin Ahdab was the 12th cabinet in the French mandate on Lebanon, headed by Khayreddin al-Ahdab for the fifth consecutive time. Although it is a reshuffle, it is considered a new cabinet at the request of the Constitutional Bloc. President Émile Eddé appointed three ministers affiliated with the National Bloc following the resignation of three ministers, two of which were Constitutionals. It won the confidence of the Parliament on 18 January 1938, with 38 votes in favour, 13 against, 5 abstentions and 6 absents. On 21 March, Prime Minister al-Ahdab resigned.

== Composition ==
Fifth cabinet of Khayreddin Ahdab
Portfolio	Minister	Political affiliation	Religious affiliation	Governorate
Prime Minister	Khayreddin al-Ahdab	National Bloc	Sunni	North
Justice	Khayreddin al-Ahdab	National Bloc	Sunni	North
Finance	Mousa Nammour	National Bloc	Maronite	Bekaa
Defence	Mousa Nammour	National Bloc	Maronite	Bekaa
Interior	Georges Tabet	National Bloc	Maronite	Beirut
Health	Ibrahim Haidar	Constitutional Bloc	Shia	Bekaa
Mail	Ibrahim Haidar	Constitutional Bloc	Shia	Bekaa
Public Works	Kamel Gargour	National Bloc	Greek Catholic	Beirut
Agriculture	Hikmat Jumblatt	National Bloc	Druze	Mount Lebanon
Economy	Khalil Kasib	National Bloc	Greek Orthodox	Beirut
Education	Khalil Kasib	National Bloc	Greek Orthodox	Beirut
