= Pierre-Georges Arlabosse =

French politician

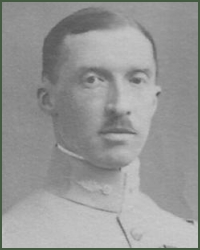
Pierre-Georges Arlabosse

Pierre-Georges Arlabosse (French pronunciation: [pjɛʁ ʒɔʁʒ aʁlabɔs]; Arabic: بيار جورج أرلابوس; 8 July 1891 – 8 February 1950) was a French politician, born in Pamiers.

He was appointed Brigadier General in 1942, then Division General in 1946, then Army Corps General in 1949.

He became acting President of Lebanon for 5 days, from 4 to 9 April 1941 for the interim period in transfer of presidency from Émile Eddé, the third president of the Lebanese republic under the French Mandate 1936 to 1941 and president Alfred Naqqache (French transliteration Alfred Georges Naccache), the fourth president for 1941 to 1943.

== See also ==
- List of presidents of Lebanon

| Preceded by Émile Eddé | President of Lebanon; Acting; April 4, 1941 – April 9, 1941 | Succeeded by Alfred Naqqache |
