= Blanche Lohéac-Ammoun =

- Born: 20 October 1912; Ottoman Empire
- Died: 5 January 2011 (aged 98); 16th arrondissement of Paris, France
- Education: Jesuit School of Law

Blanche Lohéac-Ammoun (20 October 1912 – 5 January 2011) was a Lebanese French painter, illustrator, and writer.

== Biography ==
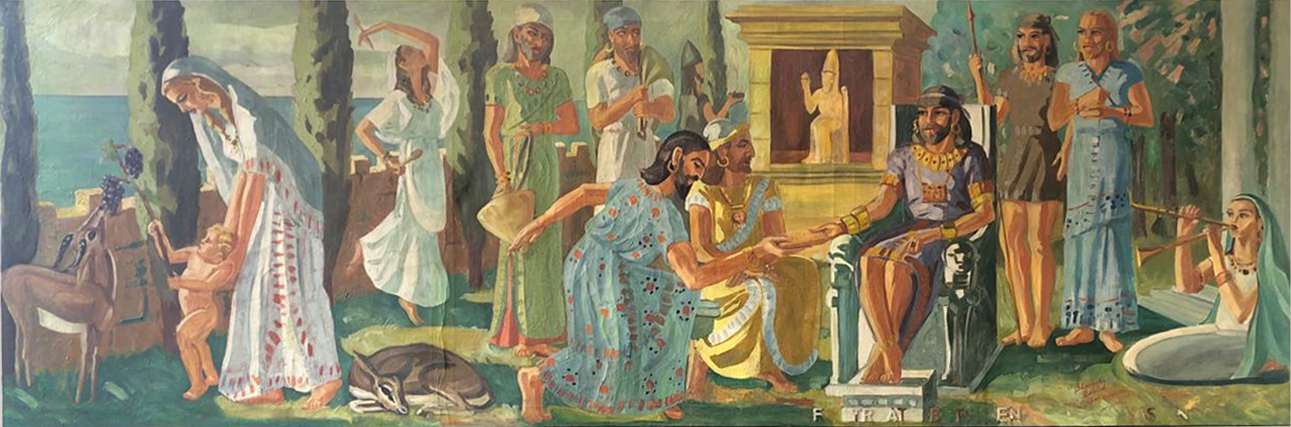
The 1939 painting Traités Phéniciens ("Phoenician Treaties") by Blanche Lohéac-Ammoun

The daughter of the lawyer and poet Daoud Amoun and the niece of the Ottoman politician Iskandar Ammoun, Blanche Ammoun was born in 1912 in Lebanon, which was then part of the Ottoman Empire. Her interest in art began in her childhood, when she attended grade school in Cairo. She would later attribute this artistic impulse to her half-Italian mother, Victoria Chiha.

She then trained as a lawyer, graduating from the Jesuit School of Law in 1931 alongside Nina Helou as the first two Lebanese women to obtain law degrees. However, she never practiced law and instead pursued a career in art. In 1938, she held her first solo exhibition, in Beirut.

After marrying the French officer and French Liberation Army Resistance member André Lohéac in 1944, she moved to Paris, where she devoted herself entirely to painting. She exhibited her work in numerous shows, primarily in France but also in her home country.

Lohéac-Ammoun is known for developing her technique of sablirisés or sablinisés, in which she would attach shards of mirror to metal supports, arranged like a mobile. She also used mica, sand, and other materials in some of her paintings to enhance their textures. The writer Pierre Lyautey labeled her "a veritable magician." Her work was also marked by "strong Phoenician tendencies."

In addition to her painting, she wrote children's literature, writing texts that she illustrated herself. She published Histoire du Liban ("History of Lebanon") in 1937, a cartoon history of her homeland that was assessed as a work of "finesse and humor." Her 1964 book Zénobie, reine de Palmyre ("Zenobia, Queen of Palmyra") received the Prix Sobrier-Arnould, an award for children's literature, the following year.

Lohéac-Ammoun and her husband had three children; he predeceased her in 1966. She died in 2011 in the 16th arrondissement of Paris.

== Selected works ==
- Histoire du Liban, Beirut, 1937; 2nd edition, 1940; 3rd edition, Le Jour, 1948 ; 4th edition, Beirut, 1968.
- Zénobie reine de Palmyre, Le Réveil, 1964 – Prix Sobrier-Arnould 1965.
- Les Phéniciens en quatorze tableaux, Beirut, 1984.
- Folklore libanais, Beirut, 1986.
- Liban de jadis et d'hier, Beirut, 1988.
