= Daoud Amoun =

Lebanese politician (1869–1922)

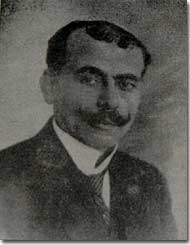

1st Legislative speaker of Greater Lebanon
- In office 4 October 1920 – 11 March 1922
- Succeeded by: Habib Pacha Saad

Personal details
- Born: 1869
- Died: 1922 (aged 54–55)

Daoud Amoun (Arabic: داود عمون; 1867 – 1922) was a Lebanese Maronite Christian politician who served as speaker of the Administrative Committee of Greater Lebanon from 1920 to 1922.

Born in Deir al-Qamar, Amoun moved to France, where he studied law. He returned to Lebanon, and became known for writing patriotic poems about the country. Before the first world war, he moved with his children to Egypt. His daughter Blanche Lohéac-Ammoun would become a known painter in Lebanon and France.

In 1918, he headed a delegation to Paris Peace Conference, where he demanded an independent Lebanese state. Two years later, the State of Greater Lebanon was established, and he was appointed as a member of the Administrative Committee, which was the first legislative body. During the first session, he was elected as its speaker. He is the first legislative speaker of Lebanon.
