= Alfred Naqqache =

Lebanese statesman (1888–1978)

Alfred Georges Naccache
- ألفرد جورج نقاش
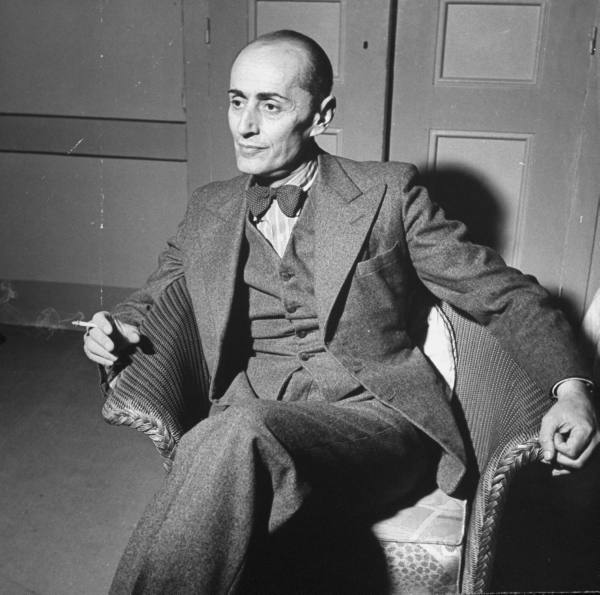

6th Foreign Minister of Lebanon
- In office 1953–1955
- President: Abdallah El-Yafi; Sami Solh
- Preceded by: Pierre-Georges Arlabosse
- Succeeded by: Hamid Beik Frangieh

11th Prime Minister of Lebanon
- In office 7 April 1941 – 26 November 1941
- President: Émile Eddé; Himself
- Preceded by: Abdullah Bayhum
- Succeeded by: Ahmed Daouk

President of Lebanon
- In office 9 April 1941 – 18 March 1943
- Prime Minister: Himself; Ahmad Daouk; Sami Solh
- Preceded by: Émile Eddé
- Succeeded by: Ayoub Tabet (acting)

Personal details
- Born: 3 May 1888 Beirut, Ottoman Empire
- Died: 26 September 1978 (aged 90) Beirut, Lebanon
- Party: None

Alfred Georges Naccache (Arabic: ألفرد جورج نقاش; 3 May 1888– 26 September 1978) was a Lebanese statesman, Prime Minister and head of state during the French Mandate of Lebanon. In 1919 he contributed to La Revue Phénicienne which was established by Charles Corm in Beirut. He was serving as prime minister when he was appointed president by the French authorities after the resignation of Emile Edde. Pierre-Georges Arlabosse served as acting president for 6 days before Naccache assumed office. From 1953 to 1955 he served as foreign minister. The National Museum of Beirut was opened by him on 27 May 1942.

A street in the Lebanese capital Beirut is named in his honor.

Political offices
Preceded by Abdullah Bayhum	Prime Minister of Lebanon; April 7, 1941- November 26, 1941	Succeeded by Ahmed Daouk
Preceded by Pierre-Georges Arlabosse; Acting	President of Lebanon; April 9, 1941-March 18, 1943	Succeeded by Ayoub Tabet; Acting
