= Nina Helou =

Lebanese lawyer and former First Lady of Lebanon

- نينا حلو
- Nina (l) and Charles Helou (r) at the Vatican

First Lady of Lebanon
- In role 23 September 1964 – 22 September 1970
- President: Charles Helou
- Preceded by: Zelpha Tabet
- Succeeded by: Iris Handaly

Personal details
- Born: Nina Trad; 1904 Beirut, Beirut Vilayet, Ottoman Empire
- Died: 1989 (aged 84–85) Beirut, Lebanon
- Spouse: Charles Helou (m. 1952)
- Relatives: Petro Trad (uncle)
- Education: Saint Joseph University
- Occupation: Attorney

Nina Michel Helou (Arabic: نينا حلو; 1904–1989) was a Lebanese lawyer and former First Lady of Lebanon from 1964 to 1970. She was the second woman lawyer to be registered with the bar association of the Mandate for Syria and Lebanon, during French administration. Her practice was mainly focused on women and women's issues. Marrying a fellow lawyer, she was the first woman to serve on the Beirut City Council. In 1964, Helou became the First Lady of Lebanon and during her tenure, she oversaw the completion of the Baabda Palace and the renovation of the Beiteddine Palace, as well as a city-wide beautification project. She was also devoted to social welfare programs and charitable organizations, particularly the Lebanese Red Cross.

== Early life ==
Nina Trad was born in 1904 in Beirut, capital of the Beirut Vilayet, Ottoman Empire to Michel Trad and his Colombian-born Lebanese wife. She was the niece of Petro Trad, who served as President of the French Mandate of Lebanon in 1943. Attending law school at the Jesuit School of Law, Trad met Charles Helou, another student in the law faculty. She graduated in 1931 with Blanche Ammoun, though Ammoun did not ever practice law. Later that year, on 7 October 1931, Paulette Ameslend Tamer, a French national, became the first woman to register with the bar association of the French Mandate of Lebanon. Trad was admitted to the bar on 6 January 1932, becoming its second woman member. (Note: The Beirut Bar Association, specifies that Tamer was registered as "the first female intern". Sources are unclear whether Trad was registered under the same category, but she did obtain a degree in law.)

== Career ==
After joining the bar, Trad began working in her uncle Petro Trad's law firm. She focused her practice on helping Lebanese women with legal issues. Helou joined the firm when he completed his studies and they began both a working and romantic relationship. They prepared cases together and jointly pleaded them in 1940 for the French military tribunals. Though Helou's family did not support the relationship, in part because Trad was 9 years older than he was, the couple married in 1952. Even after her marriage, Trad-Helou continued her legal practice. In addition, she was involved in many humanitarian organizations and women's rights organizations, like the Lebanese Red Cross and various women's associations which focused on the needs of women and children. She was the founder and inaugural president of the University Women's Association of Lebanon.

In 1961, Trad-Helou was appointed to serve on the Beirut City Council and proposed a beautification project for the city to preserve its historical monuments and promote tourism. Initially there was resistance from council members, but the public supported the efforts. In 1964, when her husband became President of Lebanon, she embarked upon a plan to complete the Baabda Palace, which had been under construction since 1956. Coordinating with the Ministry of Works and Maurice Chehab, head of the Bureau of Antiquities, she proposed changes to the design to make it more authentically Lebanese, using archways and yellow stone. Initially, the couple lived in rented quarters, but in January 1969, it began being used as the official residence of the presidency. When the Baabda Palace was completed, she turned her attention to the presidential summer residence, Beiteddine Palace beginning a renovation project.

== Death and legacy ==
Trad-Helou died from cancer in 1989 and her funeral, attended by many dignitaries, was held on the 1st of April at the chapel of the Holy Spirit University of Kaslik. Her husband published Nina, ou la quête de l'impossible (Nina, or the search for the impossible) in 1991 about her final struggle with disease. The government issued a postal stamp as part of a series on women's firsts in Lebanon which bore her likeness, but it was retracted after it was confirmed she was the second woman to join the bar. In 1993, she was honored posthumously, along with Sonia Ibrahim Attia, by the Arab Lawyers Union at their meeting in Casablanca for her defense of women's rights.

== Notes ==
Honorary titles
| Preceded by Zelpha Tabet | First Lady of Lebanon; 1964–1970 | Succeeded by Iris Handaly |
