= Abdallah Beyhum =

- عبد الله بيهم
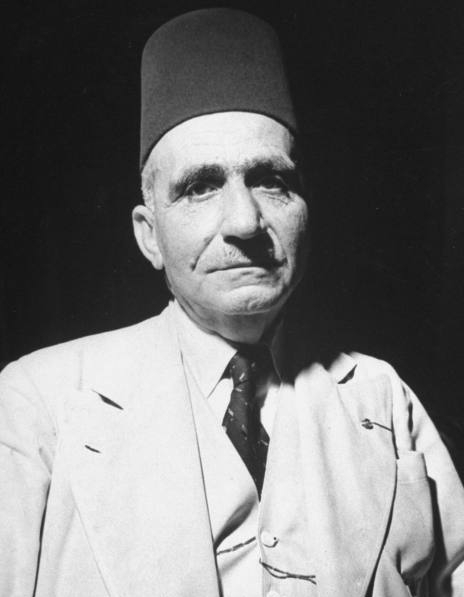

Prime Minister of French Mandate of Lebanon
- In office 29 January 1934 – 30 January 1936
- President: Privat-Antoine Aubouard (acting); Habib Pacha Saad
- Preceded by: Charles Debbas
- Succeeded by: Ayoub Tabet
- In office 21 September 1939 – 4 April 1941
- President: Émile Eddé
- Preceded by: Abdallah El-Yafi
- Succeeded by: Alfred Naqqache

Personal details
- Born: 1879; Beirut
- Died: 1962

Abdallah Beyhum (Arabic: عبد الله بيهم), also spelled as Abdullah Bayhum (1879–1962), was a Lebanese politician, and served twice as the Prime Minister of Lebanon (1934-1936 and 1939-1941).

Beyhum, a Sunni Muslim, was born in 1879 in Beirut.

He was appointed by the French High Commissioner of the Levant, Gabriel Puaux, as acting Prime Minister on 29 January 1934 during the French Mandate. After two years, on 30 January 1936, Ayoub Tabet was sworn in as Prime Minister.

Beyhum became Prime Minister officially on 21 September 1939 forming his cabinet that lasted until 4 April 1941, during the rule of Lebanese President Émile Eddé.

Political offices
Preceded by Abdallah Yafi	Prime Minister of Lebanon; 1939–1941	Succeeded by Alfred Georges Naccache
