= Naoum Labaki =

Lebanese journalist

Naoum al-Labaki
- نعوم اللبكي
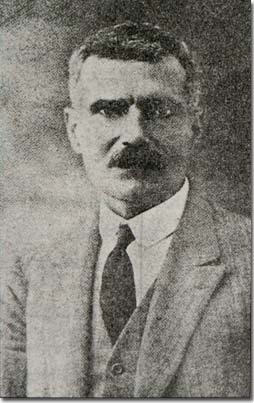

Speaker of the Representative Council of Greater Lebanon
- In office 15 October 1923 – 21 October 1924
- Succeeded by: Emile Edde

Personal details
- Born: 1875
- Died: October 21, 1924 (aged 48–49)

Naoum al-Labbaki (Arabic: نعوم اللبكي; 1875 – 21 October 1924) was a Lebanese journalist and former speaker of the Lebanese Parliament.

He was born in Baabdat, in the Mount Lebanon Mutasarrifate then immigrated to America, where he established the newspaper "Al-Manahir". He returned to Lebanon in 1908, and continued publishing the newspaper in Beirut in the village of Baabdat. After the First World War, he was elected as a deputy in the Lebanese Representative Council and then as its speaker in 1923 and he continued in this position until his death on 21 October 1924.
