= Habib Abu Shahla =

Lebanese politician

- حبيب أبو شهلا
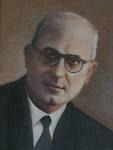

2nd Legislative Speaker of Lebanon
- In office 22 October 1946 – 7 April 1947

Deputy Prime Minister of Lebanon and Minister of Education
- In office 1943–1945

Minister of Justice
- In office 1943–1943

Personal details
- Born: 1902; Beirut, Ottoman Empire
- Died: 22 March 1957 (aged 54–55); Beirut, Lebanon
- Education: American University of Beirut; University of Paris

Habib Abu Shahla (Arabic: حبيب أبو شهلا / Ḥabīb Abū Shahlā, also spelled Abou Chahla) or Abi Shahla (Arabic: أبي شهلا / Abī Shahlā, also spelled Abi Chahla; 1902 – 22 March 1957) was a Lebanese politician and public figure, several times member of Parliament. He hailed from an Orthodox family. Abu Shahla had studied at the American University of Beirut and at the University of Paris. He was the minister of justice in 1943 and the minister of education and Deputy Prime Minister of Lebanon between 1943 and 1945 and the speaker of the Lebanese Parliament between 1946 and 1947.

A street bears his name and a statue of him stands in Beirut.

== See also ==
- List of speakers of the Parliament of Lebanon
