= Sabri Hamadeh =

Lebanese politician

- صبري حماده
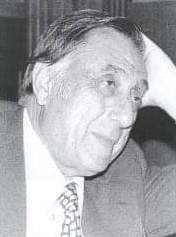
- Hamadeh in 1948

1st Legislative Speaker of Lebanon
- In office 22 October 1968 – 20 October 1970
- Preceded by: Kamel Asaad
- Succeeded by: Kamel Asaad
- In office 20 October 1964 – 9 May 1968
- Preceded by: Kamel Asaad
- Succeeded by: Kamel Asaad
- In office 20 October 1959 – 8 May 1964
- Preceded by: Adel Osseiran
- Succeeded by: Kamel Asaad
- In office 9 June 1947 – 20 March 1951
- Preceded by: Habib Abou Chahla
- Succeeded by: Ahmed Asaad
- In office 21 September 1943 – 22 October 1946
- Preceded by: Petro Trad
- Succeeded by: Habib Abou Chahla

Personal details
- Born: 1902
- Died: 1976 (age 73–74)
- Religion: Shia Islam

Sabri Hamadeh, also written as Sabri Hamadé or Hamada (Arabic: صبري حماده) (1902–1976) was a Lebanese politician and long-time Speaker of the Lebanese Parliament.

Sabri Hamadeh served as a pioneer in the Lebanese Independence. He worked with the government at that time, including Riad El Solh, the prime minister, and Bechara El Khoury, the president. He also signed the first official Lebanese flag of independence

He served as Speaker of the Lebanese Parliament for five terms: 1943-1946, 1947-1951, 1959-1964, 1964-1968 and 1968 to 1970.

== Political career ==
Sabri Hamadeh was born in 1902 in the Town of Hawr Taala, in the Bekaa Valley. A Shiite political leader, he was elected as a Member of Parliament for that region consecutively for 5 decades. Hamadeh was Deputy Prime Minister of Lebanon from 1946 to 1947. He was also the Speaker of the House of Representatives for many periods.

He served as Speaker of the Lebanese Parliament for five terms:

- 21 July 1943 to 22 October 1946
- 9 June 1947 to 20 May 1950
- 20 October 1959 to 8 May 1964
- 20 October 1964 to 9 May 1968
- 22 October 1968 to 20 October 1970

Major holders of the office of Speaker in the intermittent years who also presided as Speakers of the House were Habib Abou Chahla (1946—1947), Ahmed Alassad (1951—1953), Adel Osseiran (1953—1959) and Kamel Asaad (1964 and 1968).

Sabri Hamadeh hails from a family that was always active as a political stronghold for the Shiites of Lebanon, particularly in the Baalbek-Hermel region. He was prominently placed in the struggle for Lebanese independence. He was characterized with a policy of moderation and compromise in the national political scene, openness and patience in tackling of various political crisis, and a vision for the future of the country. He was instrumental in establishment of a separate Higher Council for the Shiites of Lebanon.

He played a very crucial role during the Lebanese presidential election held on August 17, 1970. There were three rounds of elections in the Lebanese Parliament that year resided by Sabri Hamadé. In the third decisive round, and out of a total of 99 possible votes, presidential candidate and MP Suleiman Frangieh received 50 votes against 49 to rival the ruling Shihabist candidate Elias Sarkis, a non-MP. Speaker Sabri Hamadé, refused to announce the election of a President on a 1-vote difference on the grounds that the law dictates that the minimum vote to win (in the third round) should be the half plus one. As it was, Franjieh had received half the votes plus one half. But when Kamal Jumblat threatened that he and the deputies on his side would vote for Franjieh, in a repeated round. Hamadeh declared Franjieh winner so that he wouldn't win by a larger margin. Hamadeh's term ended on 20 October 1970 after Frangieh was sworn as President 23 September 1970. Hamadeh was replaced by Kamel Asaad as Speaker of Parliament.

== Era of Lebanese independence ==
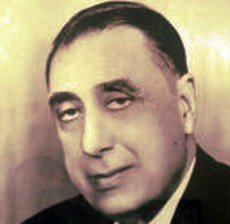
Sabri Hamadé.

After the French High Commissioner issued instructions to dissolve the Lebanese parliament and to suspend the Lebanese constitution and going ahead in arresting Lebanese President Bechara El Khoury and Lebanese Prime Minister Riad Solh in 1943, in addition to politicians Camille Chamoun and Adel Osseiran, and amending the Lebanese constitution on November 8, 1943, the free MPs and ministers headed by Sabri Hamadeh gathered on November 11, 1943 and demanded the abolition of arbitrary procedures practiced by the French High Commissioner. This also resulted in massive demonstrations by the Lebanese people heading to the House of Representatives building, and shouting slogans for the release of detainees, chanting slogans for freedom and independence. Sabri Hamadé and his companions gathered in a joint meeting and amended the Lebanese flag to become made up of three sections horizontal: red, white, and red, and in the center a green cedar tree. The House Speaker Sabri Hamadé and the Lebanese MPs issued a strongly worded memorandum addressed to the representative of the French government in Lebanon, and also pleaded for Arab support from neighboring Arab states and denouncing the acts of oppression practiced by the French soldiers and the Lebanese police. They sent another memorandum to the ambassadors of Britain and the United States in Lebanon, and to the governments of Egypt and Iraq, explaining the deteriorating situation in Lebanon, the atrocities and transgressions of the French public commission ruling Lebanon and the arbitrary and illegal actions practiced by the French High Commissioner in Lebanon and his officials. The Lebanese revolt was endorsed by all the Lebanese sects and religious denominations. On the day of November 12, 1943, the deputies gathered at the home of Deputy Saeb Salam, where they decided to give confidence to an interim Lebanese government, headquartered in Bchamoun. After a number of confrontations and popular uprising, and pressure from Gen. Spears of Britain, French authorities backed down and released the Lebanese statesmen detainees held in Rashaya on November 22, 1943, the date of the Lebanese independence.

== Establishment of the Higher Islamic Shiite Council ==
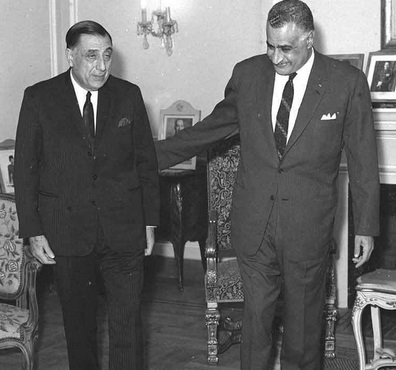
Hamadé with Egyptian President Gamal Abdel Nasser in Cairo, 1968

Since his arrival in Lebanon, Imam Musa al-Sadr opened a new phase of social and political action. Since 1966, Sadr began his political project, including helping disadvantaged areas and their rights, and demanding fairness on the basis of citizenship not on sectarian basis, and the start of process for the establishment of a separate council or organization for the Lebanese Shiites. Soon with pressure, Sabri Hamadé became a founder of Higher Islamic Shiite Council. On February 17, 1966, a Shiite delegation including both Imam Sadr and Sheikh Hussein al-Khatib for the Shiite clerics, attended by Lebanese House Speaker and Shiite political leader Sabri Hamadeh and all the nineteen Shiite deputies in the Lebanese Parliament launched the Council. A special declaration was prepared to present during a visit to the Lebanese President Charles Helou, a manifesto of demands on behalf of the Shiite community.

In early 1967, a special committee chaired by Sabri Hamadé, prepared a proposal of the law. This was preceded by a meeting of the Shiite members of the Lebanese House of Representatives in Hamadé's office, where a consolidated text established the organization of the proposed council consisting of three bodies: General Commission, the Executive Commission and the Shariah Commission.

On a meeting held by the Lebanese House of Representatives (the Parliament), the proposed law was discussed with amendments proposed by the Lebanese government to organize the Shiite community. This amended text was approved by the House of Representatives on 16 May 1967, with a second amendment introduced on the article 26 and 30, in a Parliamentary meeting headed by Parliament Speaker Sabri Hamadé and the presence of Lebanese Government headed by Prime Minister Rashid Karami. The Council was named the Higher Islamic Shiite Council (in Arabic المجلس الإسلامي الشيعي الأعلى).
