= 1920 Lebanese legislative speaker election =

- 4 October 1920

All 17 members of the Administrative Committee
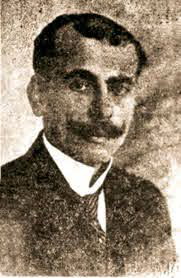
Nominee	Daoud Amoun
Electoral vote	17
Percentage	100%
Elected Speaker
Daoud Amoun

The 1920 Lebanese legislative speaker election was the first legislative speaker election.

The 17 members of the Administrative Committee of Greater Lebanon elected Daoud Amoun as speaker of the committee.
