= Nicolas Ghosn =

Lebanese politician and lawyer (1940–2018)

- Born: 1940; Kousba, Lebanon
- Died: 1 November 2018 (aged 77–78)
- Occupation: Politician

Nicolas Ghosn (1940 – 1 November 2018) was a Lebanese politician and lawyer.

Ghosn first ran in the Lebanese Parliament elections in 1992, which he lost. However, he won in 1996 and his term lasted until 2000. He lost his seat in the 2000 elections but regained it in 2005. Ghosn decided to not run again in 2009, thus ending his political career. In his final term, he ran under the Future Movement, which helped him gain support of the Greek Orthodox Church and set up the March 14 Alliance.

He was the son of Fouad Nicolas Ghosn, former Deputy Prime Minister of Lebanon.
