= Khayreddin al-Ahdab =

Lebanese politician (1894–1941)

- خير الدين الأحدب
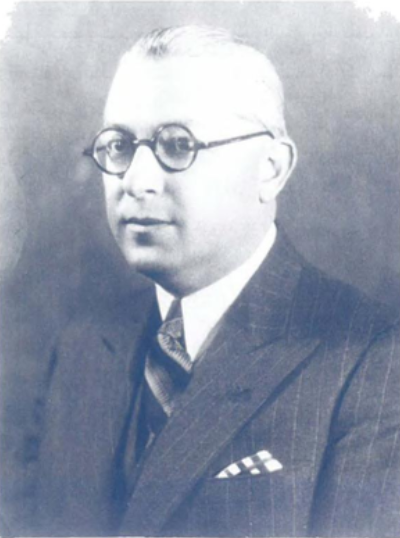

Prime Minister of Lebanon
- In office 5 January 1937 – 18 March 1938
- President: Émile Eddé
- Preceded by: Ayoub Tabet
- Succeeded by: Khaled Chehab

Personal details
- Born: 1894 Beirut, Ottoman Lebanon
- Died: 1941 (aged 46–47) Marseille, France

Khayr al-Din al-Ahdab (Arabic: خير الدين الأحدب; 1894–1941) was a Lebanese politician who served as Prime Minister of Lebanon from 1937 to 1938, becoming the first Muslim to hold the office. In about 1925 he started the newspaper The New Testament, and published another called Pan Arab.

Political offices
Preceded by Ayoub Tabet	Prime Minister of Lebanon; 1937–1938	Succeeded by Khaled Chehab
