= Muhammad al-Jisr =

Lebanese politician and cleric (1881–1934)

His Excellency Sheikh Muhammad al-Jisr
- الشيخ محمد الجسر
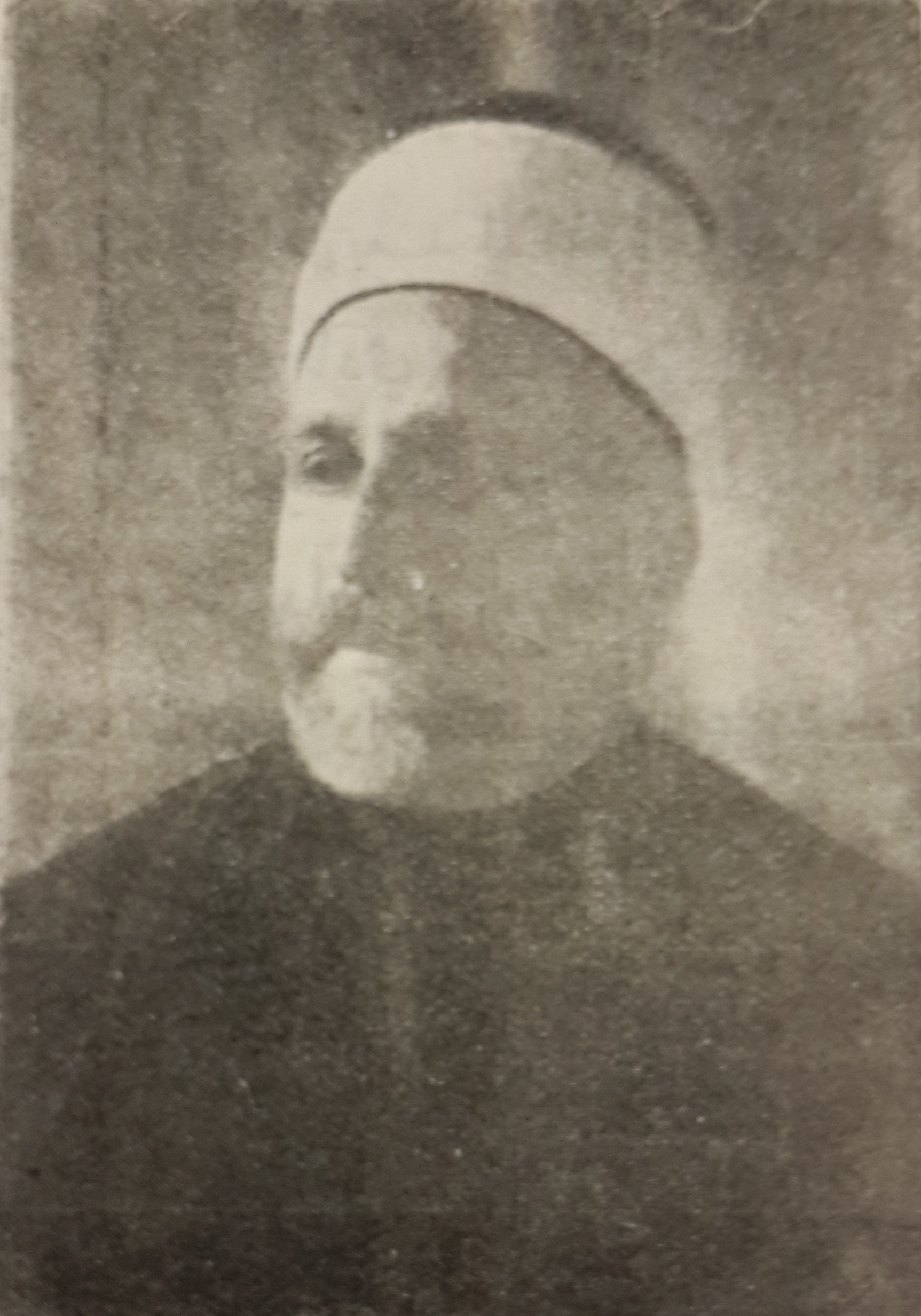

Speaker of the Parliament of Lebanon
- In office 18 October 1927 – 10 May 1932
- President: Charles Debbas
- Prime Minister: Bechara El Khoury; Habib Pacha Saad; Émile Eddé; Auguste Adib Pacha; Charles Debbas
- Preceded by: Moussa Namour
- Succeeded by: Charles Debbas

Speaker of the Senate of Greater Lebanon
- In office 25 May 1926 – 6 October 1927

Personal details
- Born: 1881 Tripoli
- Died: 1934 (aged 52–53)

Sheikh Muhammad ibn Husayn ibn Muhammad al-Jisr (Arabic: محمد بن حسين بن محمد الجسر, romanized: Muḥammad al-Jisr; 1881–1934) was a Lebanese cleric and politician who served as the Speaker of the Parliament of Lebanon from 18 October 1927 to 10 May 1932.

== Early years ==
Born in Tripoli during the Ottoman rule, al-Jisr was the son of Sheikh Husayn al-Jisr, an editor in Tripoli Newspaper and the founder of the National School. His son attended it, where he learned the Arabic language and the teachings of Islam.

== Political career ==
Al-Jisr was appointed in 1926 as a Senator for the seat of Tripoli and the Sunni sect after the announcement of the constitution. He was elected on 25 May 1926 as the Speaker of the Senate, where he received the majority of 14 votes out of 16.

He headed the Parliamentary Assembly, which was formed in 1927 and assigned to discuss the constitutional amendments proposed by the government. He was added to the Chamber of Deputies after the Senate was cancelled, which became the only house of the Parliament. He was elected as Speaker on 18 October with a plurality of 22 votes, against Ayoub Tabet who received 18 votes.

In 1932, he announced his candidacy in the presidential election. The Maronites, as the largest sect in the country, claimed the position to be theirs, but the Muslims objected to this because the constitution did not require it. Initially, the main candidates were Émile Eddé and Bechara El Khoury, but many deputies were leaning towards electing al-Jisr. To prevent a Muslim being elected as president, the French High Commissioner suspended the constitution and dissolved both the parliament and the government, keeping Charles Debbas, the current president, in office. Following this decision, al-Jisr retired from politics and died in 1934.
