= Habib Pacha Saad =

President of Lebanon from 1934 to 1936

- حبيب باشا السعد
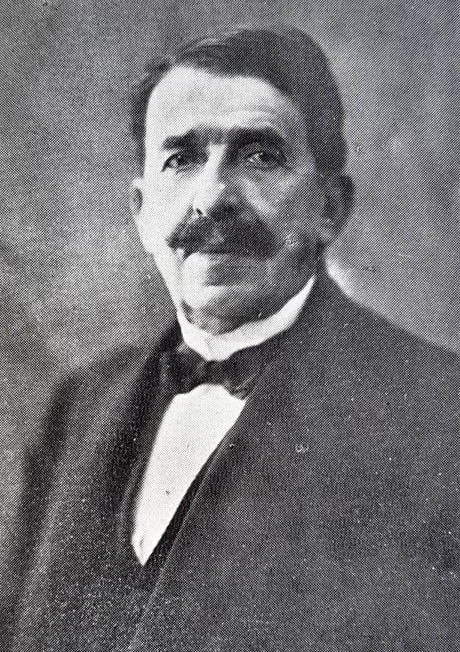
- Saad in 1941

President of Lebanon
- In office 30 January 1934 – 20 January 1936
- Prime Minister: Abdallah Beyhum
- Preceded by: Charles Debbas
- Succeeded by: Émile Eddé

Speaker of the Representative Council of Greater Lebanon
- In office 25 May 1922 – 15 October 1923
- Preceded by: Daoud Amoun
- Succeeded by: Naoum Labaki

Personal details
- Born: 1867 Ain Traz, Ottoman Lebanon
- Died: 5 May 1942 (aged 74–75) Beirut, French Lebanon

Habib Bacha El-Saad (Arabic: حبيب باشا السعد; 1867 – 5 May 1942) was a Lebanese Maronite politician who was born in Ain Traz, Aley District. He served as the Speaker of the Parliament of Lebanon from May 1922 to October 1923. Initially the 3rd Prime Minister of Lebanon from August 10, 1928 to May 9, 1929 he was named President under the French Mandate on January 30, 1934 and served in this capacity to January 20, 1936.

== See also ==
- List of presidents of Lebanon

== Sources ==
- Robin Leonard Bidwell (1998): Dictionary of Modern Arab History, p. 361.

Political offices
Preceded by Bechara El Khoury	Prime Minister of Lebanon; August 10, 1928–May 9, 1929	Succeeded by Bechara El Khoury
Preceded by Antoine Privat-Aubouard (acting)	President of Lebanon; January 30, 1934–January 20, 1936	Succeeded by Émile Eddé
