= Petro Trad =

President of French Lebanon in 1943

- بترو طراد
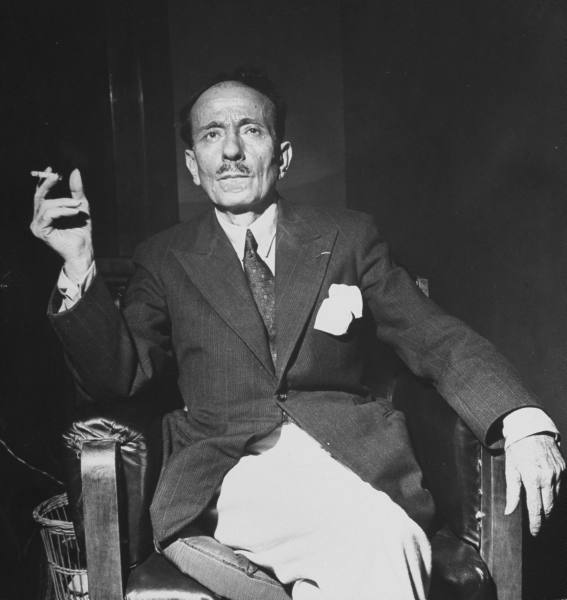

8th President of French Mandate of Lebanon
- In office 22 July 1943 – 21 September 1943
- Preceded by: Ayoub Tabet (acting)
- Succeeded by: Bechara El Khoury

14th Prime Minister of French Mandate of Lebanon
- In office 1 August 1943 – 25 September 1943
- Preceded by: Ayoub Tabet (acting)
- Succeeded by: Riad Solh

Personal details
- Born: 1886 Beirut, Ottoman Empire
- Died: 5 April 1947 (aged 60–61) Beirut, Lebanon
- Relations: Nina Helou (niece)

Petro Trad (Arabic: بترو طراد; 1886–1947) was a Lebanese lawyer, politician, who served as President of the French Mandate of Lebanon for a brief period (22 July 1943 – 21 September 1943).

== Biography ==
Trad was born to an Eastern Orthodox family in Beirut and received a law degree from the University of Paris. He was an executive officer of the "Beirut Reform Movement," along with Salim Ali Salam. He was one of six signatories to a petition presented to the French Foreign Ministry in 1913 on behalf of Christian sects in Beirut, that demanded an end to Ottoman control of Syria (including Palestine and Lebanon) and called for a separate entity run by "French emissaries." This petition so angered Ottoman military governor Djemal Pasha against Lebanese in general and Christians in particular, that he asked the War Council in Aley for the execution of the six signatories. They all fled Lebanon including Trad.

After World War I, Trad returned to Beirut as an ally of the French and founded the "League of Christian Sects", which comprised the elite of Beirut society and demanded a French Mandate of Lebanon and Syria. His law firm attained fame throughout the region, partly because he would defend the poor, who could not afford his fees.

He was elected deputy from Beirut in 1925 serving in the Lebanese Parliament for much of the 1920s and 1930s, either elected or appointed by the French authorities. He was a member of the parliamentary committee that worked on the French-Lebanese Treaty of 1936. The French supported him as the Speaker of the Parliament of Lebanon from November 1934 to October 1935 and from October 1937 to September 1939.

Trad could not stay neutral in the fierce political feud between the staunchly pro-French Émile Eddé and the independentist Bechara El Khoury. In his memoirs Bechara El Khoury accuses Trad of supporting Eddé. In fact, Trad believed that both El Khoury and Eddé were incapable of winning the presidency and he promoted himself as a consensus candidate.

Trad became president by default for an interim period. He was briefly appointed by the French government as President, to oversee the election of a new president by members of an appointed parliament. The election of Bechara El Khoury in 1943 made it clear to him that his chances of winning the presidency were nil. He died in Beirut on 5 April 1947.

Preceded by Ayoub Tabet; Acting	President of Lebanon; July 22, 1943 – September 21, 1943	Succeeded by Bechara El-Khoury
