= Khaled Chehab =

Lebanese politician

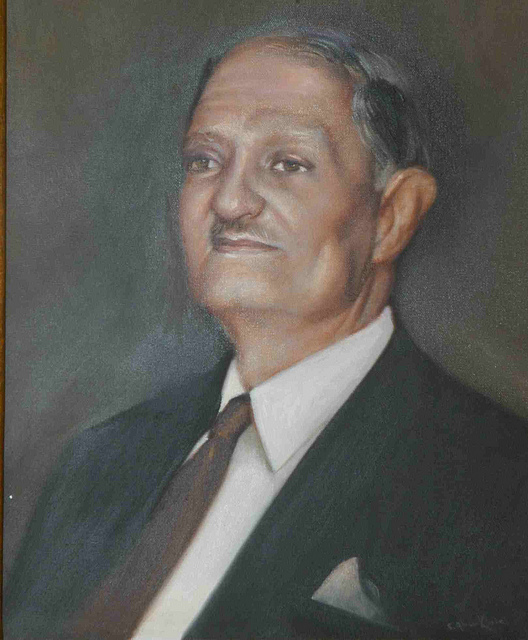
A painting of Emir Khaled Chehab

Emir Khaled Chehab (Arabic: الأمير خالد شهاب; 1892 – November 12, 1978) was a Lebanese politician and the 8th Prime Minister of Lebanon, serving for two short terms. The first was between 21 March 1938 until 1 November 1938 during the rule of President Émile Eddé during the French Mandate. He was also the first Prime Minister during the rule of President Camille Chamoun for the period of September 1952 to April 1953, during which time the electoral law to guarantee women's suffrage in Lebanon was passed.

He was also a Member of the Lebanese Parliament for six terms (ranging from 1922 to 1939) during the Mandate mostly representing the South. He served as the Speaker of the Parliament of Lebanon from October 1935 to June 1937. In 1960 he was elected MP for Marjayoun-Hasbaya Electoral district for a 4-year term during the administration of his distant cousin President Fouad Chehab.

Khaled Chehab took a number of ministerial positions at various times, including Finance Ministry (1927–1928), Justice Ministry (1938), Finance, Post Telephone and Telegraph (PTT), Education, Trade and Industry and Agriculture (1943) all under the French Mandate. Chehab was Minister of Justice, Foreign Affairs & Emigrants, Interior Affairs, Defense (1952–1953), Justice, Public Works in 1953 during the rule of President Camille Chamoun.

Political offices
Preceded by Khayreddin al-Ahdab	Prime Minister of Lebanon; 1938	Succeeded by Abdallah Yafi
