= Ayoub Tabet =

Lebanese politician (1884–1947)

- أيوب تابت
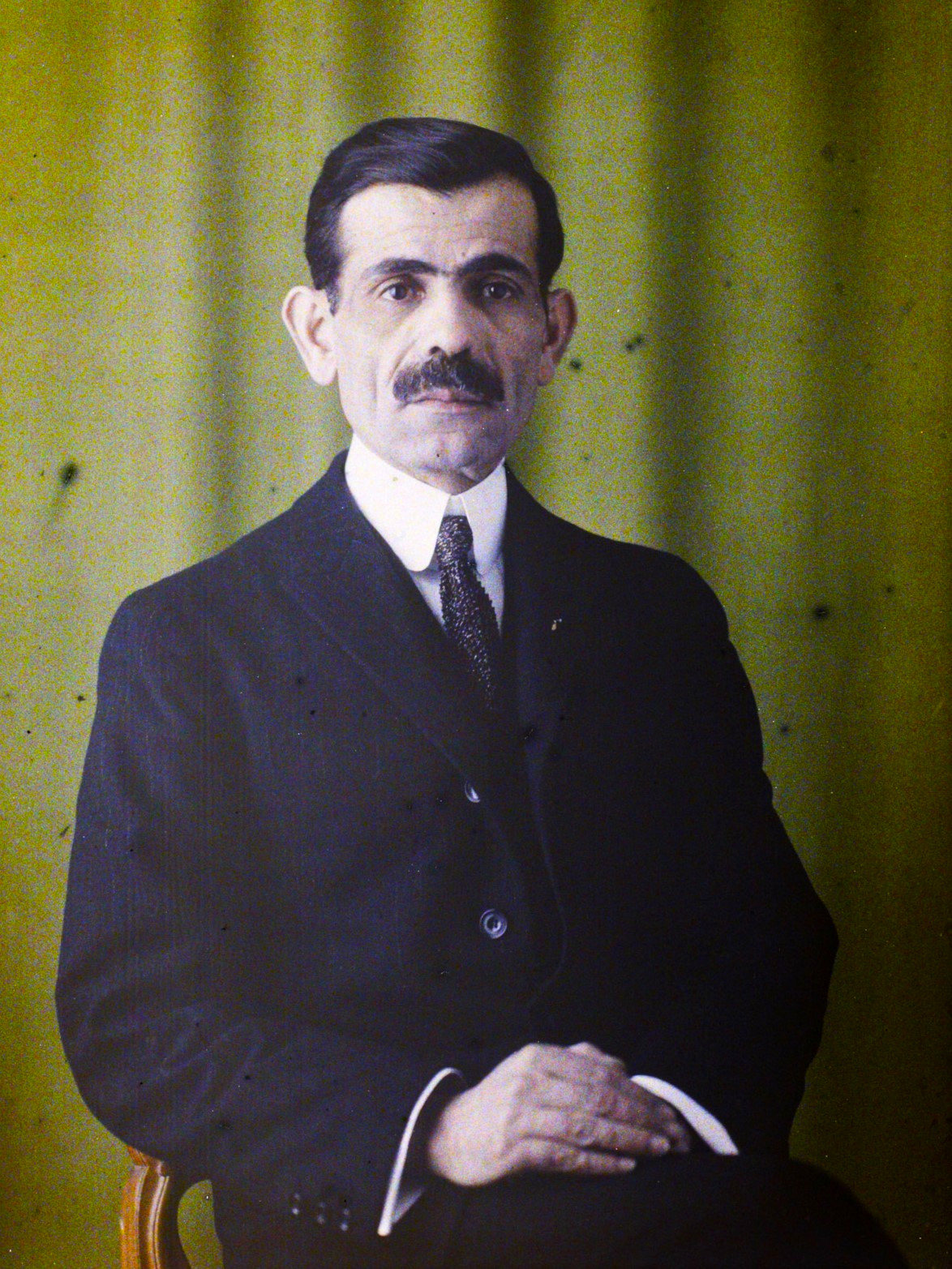
- 1922 Autochrome by Auguste Léon

6th Prime Minister of French Mandate of Lebanon
- In office Acting: 22 March 1943 – 22 July 1943
- Preceded by: Sami as-Solh
- Succeeded by: Petro Trad
- In office 30 January 1936 – 5 January 1937
- President: Émile Eddé
- Preceded by: Charles Debbas
- Succeeded by: Khayreddin al-Ahdab

President of French Mandate of Lebanon Acting
- In office 18 March 1943 – 22 July 1943
- Preceded by: Alfred Naqqache
- Succeeded by: Petro Trad

Personal details
- Born: 1884 Bhamdoun, Ottoman Empire
- Died: 14 February 1947 (aged 62–63) Beirut, Lebanon

Ayoub Tabet (Arabic: أيوب تابت; 1884 – 14 February 1947) was a Lebanese Protestant politician.

== Career ==
Tabet was the acting president of Lebanon during the French Mandate of Lebanon from 18 March to 22 July 1943 replacing President Alfred Naqqache and Prime Minister of Lebanon for the same period. He was also the acting prime minister (30 January 1936 - 5 January 1937).

He was also the secretary of the "Beirut Reform Movement," which had Salim Ali Salam and Petro Trad as its executive officers.

== See also ==
- Protestantism in Lebanon

Political offices
Preceded by Charles Debbas	Prime Minister of Lebanon; 30 January 1936 – 5 January 1937	Succeeded by Khayreddin al-Ahdab
Preceded by Sami as-Solh	Prime Minister of Lebanon; Acting; 22 March 1943 – 21 July 1943	Succeeded by Petro Trad
Preceded by Alfred Naqqache	President of Lebanon; Acting; 18 March 1943 – 22 July 1943	Succeeded by Petro Trad
