= Émile Eddé =

President of Lebanon (1936–1941; 1943)

His Excellency Émile Eddé OM, ONC
- إميل إدّه
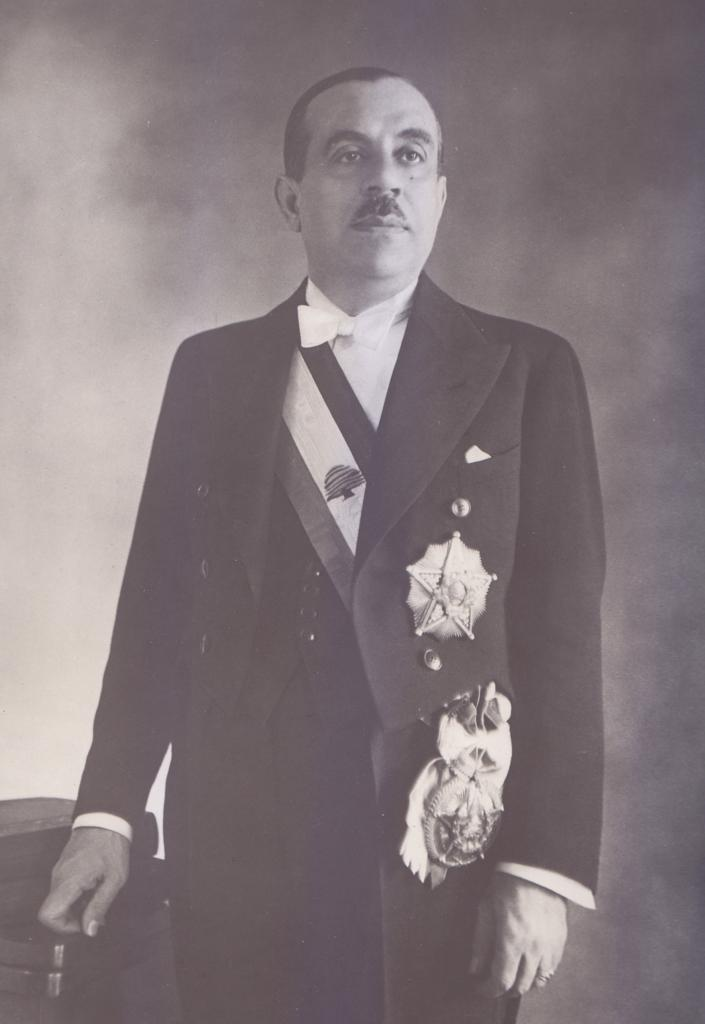
- Official portrait of Émile Eddé

President of Lebanon
- In office 11 November 1943 – 22 November 1943
- Prime Minister: Riad Al Solh
- Preceded by: Bechara El Khoury
- Succeeded by: Bechara El Khoury
- In office 20 January 1936 – 4 April 1941
- Prime Minister: Ayoub Tabet; Khayreddin al-Ahdab; Khaled Chehab; Abdallah Yafi; Abdallah Beyhum
- Preceded by: Habib Pacha Saad
- Succeeded by: Alfred Georges Naccache

Prime Minister of Lebanon
- In office 11 October 1929 – 25 March 1930
- President: Charles Debbas
- Preceded by: Bechara El Khoury
- Succeeded by: Auguste Adib Pacha

Speaker of the Parliament of Lebanon
- In office 21 October 1924 – 13 January 1925
- President: Charles Debbas
- Preceded by: Naoum Labaki
- Succeeded by: Moussa Namour

Personal details
- Born: Émile Ibrahim Eddé; 5 May 1886 Damascus, Ottoman Syria, Ottoman Empire
- Died: 27 September 1949 (aged 63) Sawfar, Lebanon
- Citizenship: Ottoman Empire (1883–1918); Arab Kingdom of Syria (1918–1920); Greater Lebanon (1920–1943); Lebanon (1943–1949)
- Party: National Bloc
- Children: 3, including Raymond
- Education: Saint Joseph University; Aix-Marseille University (PhD in law)

Émile Eddé (Arabic: إميل إدّه, romanized: Imīl Iddah; 5 May 1886 – 28 September 1949) was a Lebanese lawyer and politician who served twice as the president of Lebanon.

== Early life and education ==
Émile Eddé was a member of a Maronite Christian family which originated from Beirut and which served Shihab dynasty. He was born in Damascus, where his father, Ibrahim Eddé, was working as a translator in the French Consulate. He attended Saint Joseph University, and moved to France to study law in Aix-en-Provence, in 1902, and graduated three years later. Because of his father’s health conditions, he was forced to return to Beirut in 1909, before submitting his doctoral thesis. In 1912, he was appointed as a lawyer for the French Consulate in Beirut.

Before the First World War, he sought to separate Mount Lebanon from the Ottoman Empire, for which he was sentenced to death. However, Eddé was able to escape and took refuge in Alexandria. He participated in the establishment of the Eastern Unit in the French Army, which consisted of Lebanese and Syrian volunteers. During this period, he maintained contacts, with the French authorities, via his brother Joseph, residing in France.

== Political career ==
He was elected as a member of the first Lebanese delegation to the Paris Peace Conference that was formed on 9 October 1918, and was also appointed to the third Lebanese delegation formed in January 1920 under the chairmanship of Bishop Abdullah Khoury. The workmanship he demonstrated enabled him to make historical achievements on the level of the Lebanese national entity. Eddé urged the board of directors in Mount Lebanon – on the eve of the second delegation's departure, headed by Patriarch Elias Hoayek – to issue a decision demanding the recovery of territories taken from Lebanon. Émile Eddé signed memoranda and petitions in the framework of his activity within the third delegation, and faced the French current calling for Syrian federalism after the Faisal - Clemenceau agreement and the Zionists’ demands in a meeting attended by the third delegation under the chairmanship of Archbishop Abdullah Khoury and Weizmann, saying that Zionism aims to annex southern Lebanon up to the Litani to Palestine, which is rejected by the Lebanese people. Eddé served as the speaker of the Parliament from October 1924 to January 1925,

Emile Eddé was elected President of the Lebanese Republic in 1936 and signed during his term the Franco-Lebanese Treaty which provides for granting Lebanon its independence 5 years after ratifying the same. Nonetheless, the French government refused to ratify it thereafter.

He also developed during his presidential term the currently prevailing practice of nominating a Muslim Sunni as Lebanese Prime Minister.

He ran in the elections of 1943 against the list of Sheikh Bechara El Khoury, and issued an electoral statement on 9 August 1943, which became as a program for the Lebanese National Bloc. It was summarized in several points, chief among which are Lebanon's full democratic independence, Lebanon's attachment to the United Nations’ cause (which will replace the League of Nations), closer friendly ties with fraternal countries on the basis of mutual respect and full sovereignty, respect for all religions, equality between the Lebanese in terms of civil and political rights, equitable representation in public office based on competency, reform of the State's public administration, dissemination and mainstreaming of education, development of agriculture, industry and trade, safeguarding the Lebanese expatriates’ interests, bringing together all the Lebanese regardless of their different sects in a united nation – the Lebanese homeland. During that period, incidents succeeded each other and dangers exacerbated, rendering it necessary for Émile Eddé to establish a party that takes charge of defending Lebanon and conveying his ideas. Therefore, three deputies from his bloc: Amin Al Saad, Asaad Al Bustani and George Akl filed, on 15 May 1946, an application in order to be duly provided with a statement of notification from the Minister of Interior, and on the same day, they received the Minister of Interior's approval under No. 7582. Hence, the Lebanese National Bloc party was officially founded and was based on a program and an internal system. After that, Kesrouan El Khazen was elected President of the Party.

== See also ==
- List of political families in Lebanon
- National Bloc (Lebanon)
