= Bompiani (surname) =

Bompiani is a surname. Notable people with the surname include:

- Clelia Bompiani (1848–1927), Italian painter
- Roberto Bompiani (1821–1908), Italian painter and sculptor
- Augusto Bompiani (1852–1930), Italian painter
- Valentino Bompiani (1898–1992), Italian publisher, writer and playwright
