= Corm (surname) =

This is an article about notable people with the Corm surname

Corm is a Lebanese surname. The Corm family is a prominent and wealthy Christian family originally from Ghosta and with its roots traced back to the 15th century. They have been and continue to be active, in the Middle East and globally, in the automotive, finance, technology, and real estate sectors.

Notable people with the Corm surname include:

- Charles Corm (born 1974), Lebanese entrepreneur and investor
- Georges Corm (1940–2024), Lebanese economist and writer
- Charles Corm (1894–1963), Lebanese writer, industrialist, and philanthropist
- Daoud Corm (1852–1930), Lebanese painter

== See also ==
- Corm (disambiguation)
