= Michel Chiha =

Lebanese banker, politician, writer and journalist (1891-1954)

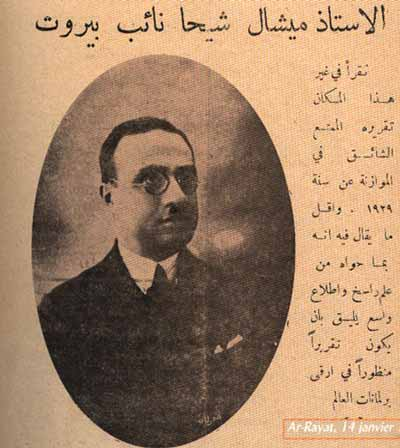
- Photograph of Michel Chiha from a 1929 issue of the Lebanese newspaper Ar-Rayat
- Born: 1891; Bmakine, Ottoman Syria
- Died: 29 December 1954 (aged 62–63); Beirut, Lebanon
- Occupations: Banker, Politician, Writer and Journalist
- Spouse: Marguerite Philippe Pharaon
- Children: 3 daughters: Micheline (d. 1940), Madeleine and Marie-Claire
- Father: Antoine Chiha

Michel Antoine Chiha (1891–1954) was a Lebanese banker, a politician, writer and journalist. Along with Charles Corm, Petro Trad and Omar Daouk, he is considered one of the fathers of the Lebanese Constitution. His ideas and actions have had an important influence on the shaping of the modern Lebanon.

== Biography ==
=== Early life and Studies ===
Michel Chiha was born in 1891 in a Christian family of Bmakine, in the Aley District, in the Mount Lebanon Governorate. He hailed from a Chaldo-Assyrian family which migrated from modern day Iraq. His father, Antoine, was a banker who founded in 1876 the Pharaon and Chiha Bank in Beirut, Lebanon. His mother belonged to a rich Greek Catholic family of Beirut with roots in modern-day Syria, the Pharaons.

After completing his studies in the Université Saint-Joseph, he joined in 1907 the family business, the Banque Pharaon & Chiha in Beirut. With the outbreak of the First World War and the Ottoman occupation of the autonomous Mount Lebanon, Chiha left Beirut to settle in Cairo, Egypt, in 1915. In addition to pursuing Law studies, he started there with a group of friends his political career and developed his political view about the future of Lebanon.

At the end of the war, he returned to Lebanon to lead the family bank. But soon afterwards, the French Mandate of Lebanon gave him the opportunity to put into practice his vision for Lebanon. In 1919 he contributed to La Revue Phénicienne which was established by Charles Corm in Beirut.

=== Political life ===
On 1 September 1920, the Greater Lebanon was proclaimed by the French High Commissioner. Michel Chiha played an important role in this proclamation, especially concerning the setting up of its borders and the establishment of its first institutions. In 1925, Chiha was elected as the representative of Beirut in the Lebanese parliament. During his mandate that ended in 1929, he was very instrumental in the establishment of the Lebanese Constitution and the Monetary and fiscal systems.

In 1926, he married his cousin Marguerite Pharaon, the sister of Henri Pharaon. They had three daughters, Micheline (d. 1940), Madeleine and Marie-Claire. In 1929, Michel Chiha left all his political responsibilities without, however, stopping the promotion of his vision of Lebanon.

In 1937, he acquired with a group of friends the French language newspaper Le Jour. Until his death in 1954, Michel Chiha delivered daily his editorial du Jour, exposing his political views and vision. During this period he started publishing poems, essays and lectures in French. In 1940, he participated in the foundation of the Beirut Stock Exchange and founded a newspaper in English, the Eastern Times.

In 1943, his brother-in-law, Bechara El Khoury, became the president of the newly independent Lebanese Republic. Chiha served as an advisor during Khoury's Mandate (1943–1952).

One important cause interested him until his death, the Palestinian cause especially after 1948 Arab-Israeli War. He took an active role in defending this cause. He died in Beirut, Lebanon, on 29 December 1954.

== Political views ==
=== The Palestinian Question ===
In May 1948, the State of Israel was proclaimed on a portion of the land of Palestine. This debacle was repeatedly commented by Michel Chiha in his editorials. In 1945 he had already written:

“No political preoccupation should turn our attention from Palestine! In our backyard, is currently developing one of the most anguishing questions of this world.”

For him this problem represents a direct menace for Lebanon, Michel Chiha writes in December 1947:

“(…) The decision to partition Palestine by creating the Jewish State, is one of the most serious mistakes of world politics. The most surprising consequences are going to result from an apparently small thing. Nor is it offensive to reason to state that this small thing will have its part to play in shaking the world to its foundations.”

In his editorials, the question of Palestine would recur often. Michel Chiha insists relentlessly on the dangers that would jeopardize the newly born state of Lebanon. We find in his editorials the following phrases:

- “There is no other country that recruits its population this way, by giving to strangers, wherever they came from and only because they’re jewish, the right to be citizens!”
- “We forget often that the State of Israel is a racist and confessional issue.”
- “The mistake is enormous.”
- “The future of Palestine is being handled between the United States and the USSR exactly as if Palestine was uninhabited!”
- “In a few month inter-confessional cohabitation in Palestine would become impossible, forever.”
- “We have ahead of us a permanent danger, a hatred without end.”
- “A mistake of this size committed in the middle of this century, our grand-children will reencounter it in the middle of the next one.”

A text from 1946 would take today a particular value in the sense that it relates directly to current events:

“…The American interventions in Palestine are increasingly looking like they’re dealing with a purely American question. It’s a pity that the people of the United States, today the most powerful in the world, would cover-up from their vantage point such an adventure; they are putting themselves in a definitive contradiction with their most sacred moral and political principles.”

== Works ==
=== Published works ===
- Politique intérieure (1964), Éditions du Trident, Beyrouth, OCLC 5223379.
- Palestine (1969), Tridant Publications, Beirut, OCLC 121803
- La maison des champs, suivie de Poèmes inédits (1965), Imprimerie catholique, Beyrouth, OCLC 5049616
- Essais (1950), Éditions du Trident, Beyrouth, OCLC 14244144
- Visage et présence du Liban (1964), Cénacle Libanais, Beyrouth, OCLC 5193480
- Lebanon : a rapid survey of Lebanon, yesterday and today in sixty-four photographs (1948), Paris, OCLC 36243459
- Liban d'aujourd'hui : 1942 (1949), Editions du Trident, Beyrouth, OCLC 25712681
- Variations sur la Méditerranée (1994), Fondation Chiha, Beyrouth, OCLC 39985361
- Images du Liban : un aperçu en soixante-quatre photographies du Liban d'autrefois et d'aujourd'hui (1948), Éditions Lumière, Paris, OCLC 13657428
- Propos d'économie libanaise (1965), Éditions du Trident, Beyrouth, OCLC 27405213
- Lubnān fī shakhṣīyatihi wa-ḥuḍūrih(1962), al-Nadwah al-Lubnānīyah, Bayrūt, OCLC 25338528
- Lebanon at home and abroad (1966), Cénacle Libanais, Beirut, OCLC 48328530
- Filasṭīn (1960), Muʼassasat Mīshāl Shīḥā, Bayrūt, OCLC 46762632
- Plain-chant, propos dominicaux (1954), Éditions du Trident, Beyrouth, OCLC 43170583

== See also ==
- Constitution of Lebanon
