= Augusto Bompiani =

Italian painter (1852–1930)

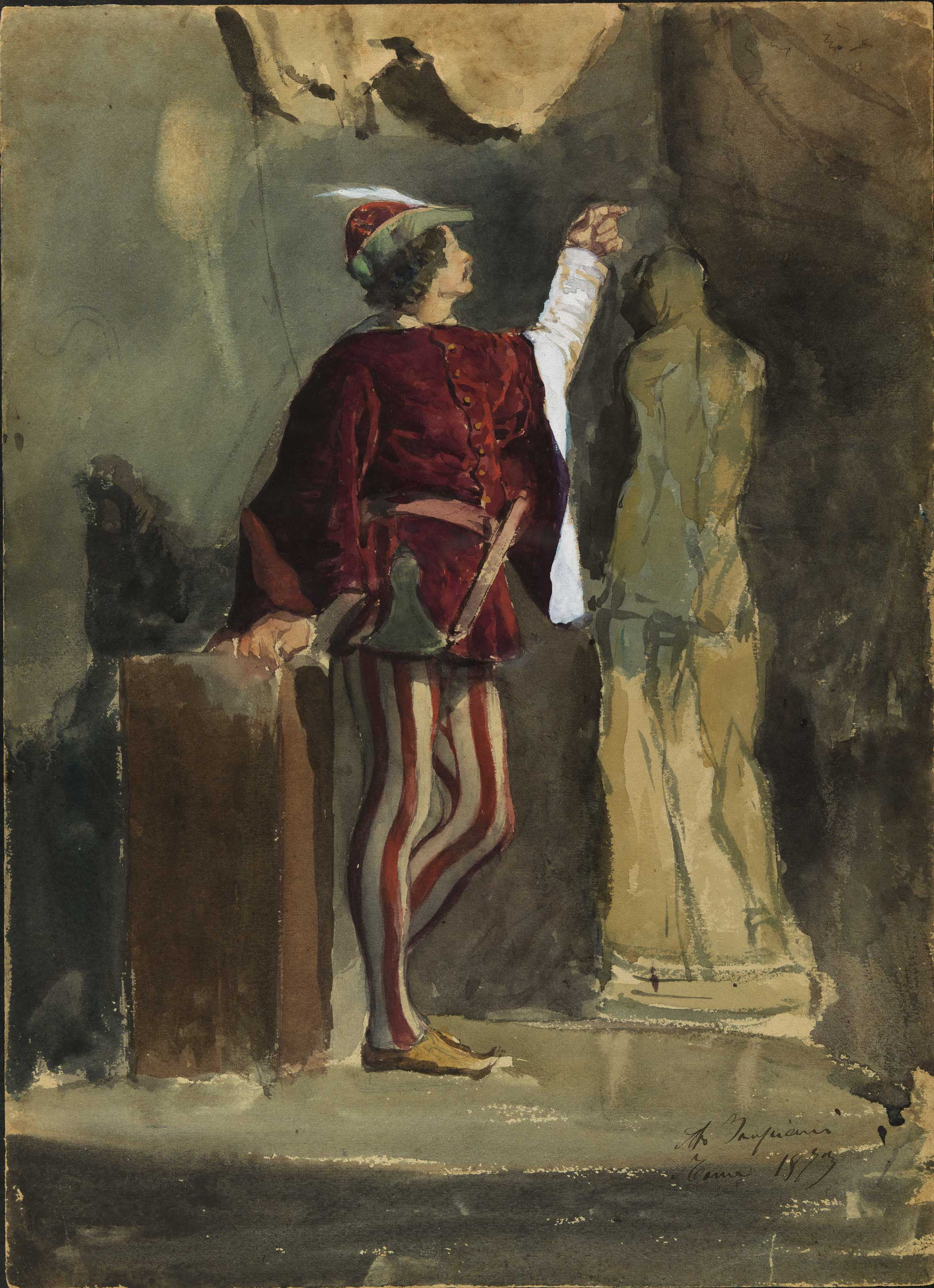
Study for an opera character, 1873

Augusto Bompiani (September 11, 1852 – May 9, 1930) was an Italian painter, mainly of landscapes including figures, in both oil and watercolors.

He was born in Rome. His father, Roberto Bompiani, was also a painter as was his sister Clelia Bompiani. Augusto trained at the Accademia di San Luca in Rome, and later became a teacher there.

At the 1880 exposition of Turin, he submitted a painting titled Fra una messa. At 1883 in the Exposition at Rome he displayed Intima e Due, a vedute of the port of Anzio. In 1883 at the Promotrice of Florence, he exhibited Due teste di Ciociara and L'arrivo. At the 1885 Turin exhibition, he displayed a Studio di paese. In 1904, he collaborated with Onorato Carlandi, E. Ferrari, and Alessandro Battaglia in illustrating an album donated to the visiting president of France, Loubet.

Augusto Bompiani died in Rome in 1930.
