= Corm (disambiguation) =

A corm is an underground part of a plant stem.

Corm may also refer to:

- Carbon monoxide-releasing molecules (CORMs)
- Corm (surname), list of people with the surname
