= Georges Corm =

Lebanese economist, historian and politician (1940–2024)

- جورج قرم

Minister of Finance
- In office 4 December 1998 – 26 October 2000
- President: Émile Lahoud
- Prime Minister: Salim El Hoss
- Preceded by: Rafik Hariri
- Succeeded by: Fuad Siniora

Personal details
- Born: 1940 Alexandria, Kingdom of Egypt
- Died: 14 August 2024 (aged 83–84) Beirut, Lebanon
- Relatives: Daoud Corm (grandfather); Charles Corm (uncle)
- Education: Institut d'Etudes Politiques de Paris; Paris University
- Website: https://georgescorm.com/

Georges Corm (Arabic: جورج قرم; 1940 – 14 August 2024) was a Lebanese economist. He served as minister of finance in the government of Salim Hoss from 1998 to 2000.

== Life and career ==
Corm was born to parents of Lebanese, Syrian and Palestinian descent. He studied at the Institut d'études politiques de Paris (1958–1961) where he graduated in Public Finance and has also a PhD from Paris University in Constitutional Law (1969).

His books have been translated into several languages. In 2018, he was the recipient of the Prix de l'essai for his work La Nouvelle Question d’Orient.

Corm died in Beirut on 14 August 2024, at the age of 84.

== Select bibliography ==
- Le Nouveau Gouvernement du Monde (Idéologies, Structures, Contre-Pouvoirs) (La Découverte, 2010)
- L’Europe et le Mythe de l’Occident (La Construction d’une Histoire) (La Découverte, 2009)
- Histoire du Moyen-Orient (De l'Antiquité à nos jours) (La Découverte/Poche, 2007)
- Le Proche-Orient éclaté (1956–2012) (Gallimard/Histoire)
- Orient-Occident, la fracture imaginaire (La découverte, 2002 and 2004)
- L'Europe et l'Orient : de la balkanisation à la libanisation. Histoire d'une modernité inaccomplie (La découverte, 1998, 2001 and 2003)
- Le Liban contemporain. Histoire et société (La découverte, 2003 and 2005)
- Histoire du pluralisme religieux dans le bassin méditerranéen (Geuthner, 1998)
- Le Nouveau Désordre économique mondial (La découverte, 1993)
- La Mue (roman, 1989)
- Le Moyen-Orient (Flammarion/dominos, 1994)
- La Question religieuse au XXI^{e} siècle. Géopolitique et crise de la post-modernité (La découverte, 2006)
- Le nouveau gouvernement du monde – Idéologies, structures, contre-pouvoirs (La découverte, 2010)
