= Robert Mouawad Private Museum =

Museum in Beirut, Lebanon

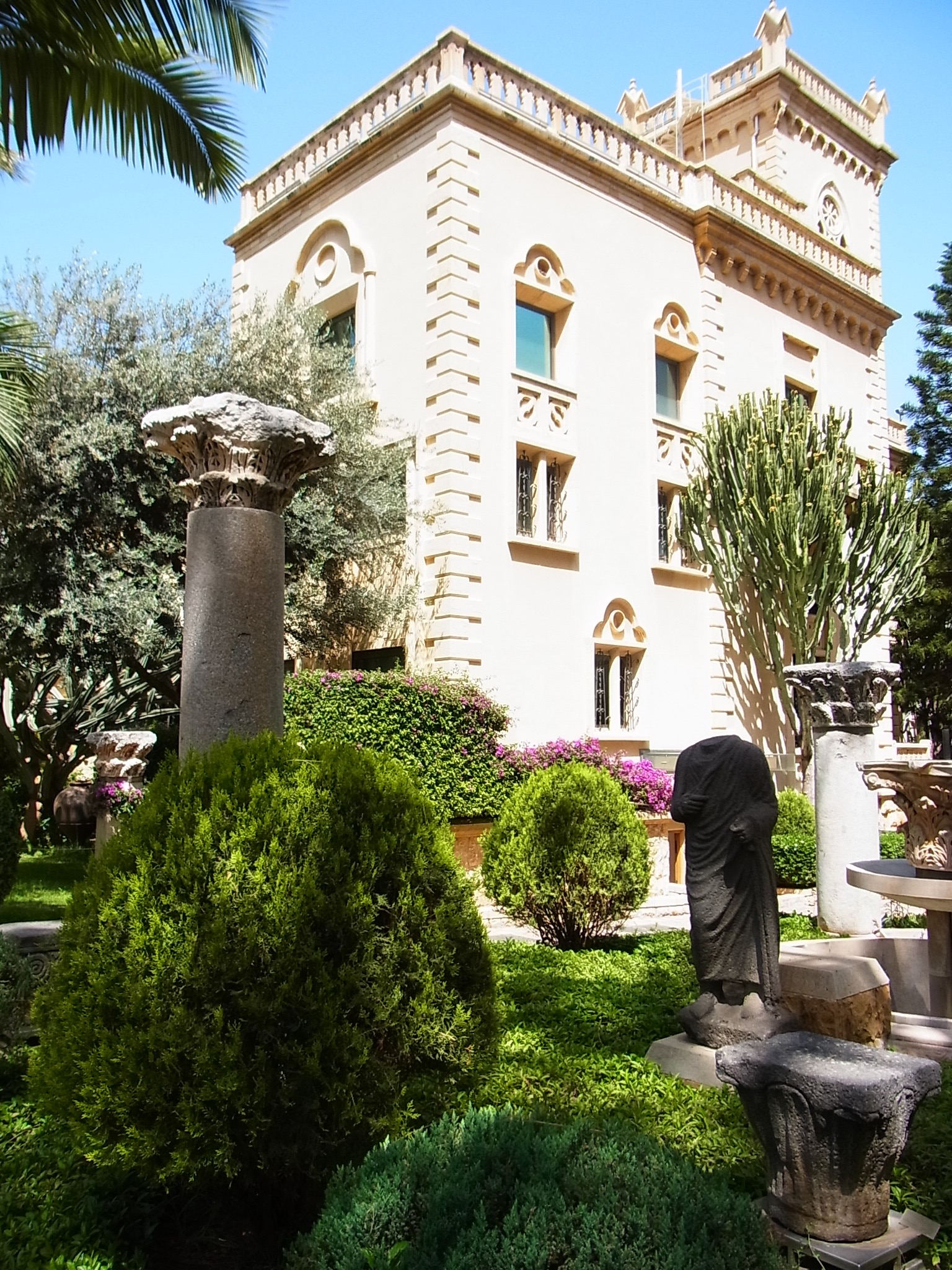

- Location within Beirut Location within Lebanon
- Established: May 11, 2006; 20 years ago
- Location: Beirut, Lebanon
- Coordinates: 33.895325°N 35.498981°E
- Type: Archaeological
- Website: www.rmpm.info

The Robert Mouawad Private Museum (Arabic: متحف روبير معوض الخاص) is a private residence in Beirut’s Zokak el-Blat quarter that was converted into a museum by the Lebanese businessman Robert Mouawad.

The palace was built in the neo-Gothic style by the Lebanese politician and art collector Henri Philippe Pharaoun in 1891. The museum was inaugurated on 11 May 2006. It houses objects of value reflecting a blend of artistic oriental and occidental influences, as well as a collection of rare books, Chinese porcelain, ceramics, and other significant artifacts.

The palace’s architecture and design reflect Pharaoun’s fascination with Islamic Art and include decorative wooden panels dating back to the 17th century, acquired especially after his repeated travels to Syria. Other displayed artifacts include Byzantine mosaics, Roman marble sculptures, jars and jugs, historical columns, pottery, ancient weapons, unique carpets, jewelry, precious stones, Melkite Catholic icons, and preserved manuscripts.

The museum was closed following the 2020 Beirut explosion. It has since reopened.

== Bibliography ==
- Farhat, May (2012-01-01). "A Mediterraneanist's Collection: Henri Pharaon's "Treasure House of Arab Art"". Ars Orientalis. 42.
