= La Revue Phénicienne =

Political magazine in Beirut (1919)

- Categories: Political magazine
- Frequency: Monthly
- Founder: Charles Corm
- Founded: 1919
- First issue: July 1919
- Final issue: December 1919
- Country: Lebanon
- Based in: Beirut
- Language: French

La Revue Phénicienne was a political journal which was published in Beirut between July and December 1919. Although it appeared for a short period, it is one of the early publications emphasizing the Phoenician identity of the Lebanese people.

== History and profile ==
La Revue Phénicienne was established by Charles Corm, and its first issue appeared in July 1919. It was published in French. The journal came out monthly until December 1919 when it folded after producing four issues.

== Contributors, ideology and content ==
The major figures who were affiliated with the Revue included Michel Chiha, Alfred Naqqache, Fuad Al Khoury and Jacques Tabet. They were Francophile writers, businessmen, lawyers and administrators. Charles Corm published many articles in the Revue under different pseudonyms. Another contributor was Bulus Nujaym, a Maronite from Jounieh. They all supported the idea of the Greater Lebanon, and Michel Chiha was the ideologue of this approach.

The Revue promoted the Phoenicianism which was considered to be the origin of the Lebanese people's cultural and national identity and also, the model for the Lebanese service economy. The journal was also a supporter of the establishment of the Greater Syria and had a clear anti-Arab political stance. However, Bulus Nujaym was an ardent supporter of the establishment of the Greater Lebanon dissociated from Syria. The articles featured in the Revue were concerned with the socio-political, economic and historical topics related to Syria and Lebanon. It also contained essays on literature. The Revue focused on the economy of Lebanon which was cited as the reason for the need to establish the Greater Syria.
