= Banque Pharaon & Chiha =

Lebanese Bank founded in 1876

Banque Pharaon & Chiha S.A.L.
- Type: Public
- Industry: Banking
- Founded: 1876; 150 years ago
- Fate: Acquired by Byblos Bank
- Headquarters: Beirut, Lebanon
- Area served: Lebanon

Banque Pharaon & Chiha S.A.L. was a Lebanese bank, founded in 1876, and headquartered in Achrafieh, Beirut. The bank was founded by Antoine Chiha during the Lebanese Ottoman era. It was one of the oldest Lebanese banks that were still operating in the recent years.

The bank was acquired by Byblos Bank in 2016.

== See also ==
- Henri Philippe Pharaoun
- List of Banks in Lebanon
