= Henri Pharaon =

Lebanese art collector, sportsman, politician and businessman

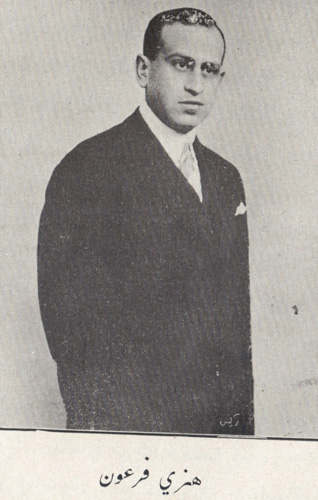

Minister of Foreign Affairs
- In office 1946–1947
- Prime Minister: Riad Al Solh
- Preceded by: Habib Abou Chahla
- Succeeded by: Hamid Frangieh

Minister of Foreign Affairs
- In office 1945–1945
- Prime Minister: Abdul Hamid Karami
- Preceded by: Office created
- Succeeded by: Hamid Frangieh

Personal details
- Born: 1901 Alexandria, Khedivate of Egypt
- Died: 6 August 1993 (aged 91–92) Beirut, Lebanon
- Cause of death: Assassination (stab wounds)
- Education: University of Lyon

Henri Philippe Pharaon (هنري فيليب فرعون; also referred to in some sources as Henry Pharoun; 1901 – August 6, 1993) was a Lebanese art collector, sportsman, politician, and businessman. As a za'im, or political boss, he played a crucial role in securing Lebanon's independence from France and served as foreign minister and other cabinet positions. He was assassinated in 1993.

== Biography ==
Pharaon was born into a prominent Lebanese Melkite Catholic family that originated in present-day Syria. His father Philippe Pharaon was a wealthy Lebanese merchant in Alexandria, Egypt. Four years later his family moved to Beirut, where he was educated in Jesuit schools. He attended college in Switzerland, and received a law degree at Lyon University in France. Pharaon married Noelie Cassar, heiress of a wealthy Maltese family from Jaffa, in 1922, while he was national tennis champion of Lebanon. They had one son, Naji Henri.

Probably the richest man in Lebanon during much of his lifetime, he helped to found independent Lebanon and designed the Lebanese flag. Known as a Mediterraneanist who encouraged cooperation between Christians and Muslims, Pharaon opposed prime minister Riad El-Solh and countered pan-Arabism. He served in the Lebanese Parliament from 1943 to 1946, and then as the Lebanese foreign minister intermittently from 1945 to 1947. After that, he retired from politics to focus on business interests. During the Lebanese Civil War of 1975–1990, Pharaoun took no side.

His business interests included Banque Pharaon & Chiha, which he founded. During the 1950s and 1960s he owned the world's biggest racing stable of Arabian horses.

In 1962, Henri Pharaon showed the architect Oscar Niemeyer a large project which he qualified as interesting and consisting in exhuming the ancient city of Baalbeck. The sketches were made by Lucien Cavro architect and archaeologist working on the most beautiful sites in Lebanon.

== Death ==
Pharaon was murdered in his bedroom at the Carlton Hotel in Beirut on 6 August 1993. He was stabbed 16 times; his driver and bodyguard were also found stabbed over 20 times to death at the scene. The Lebanese Police released a statement including the possibility of robbery as a motive for stabbing the 92-year-old man so many repeated times.

A man formerly employed by Pharaon as a bodyguard was arrested for his murder.

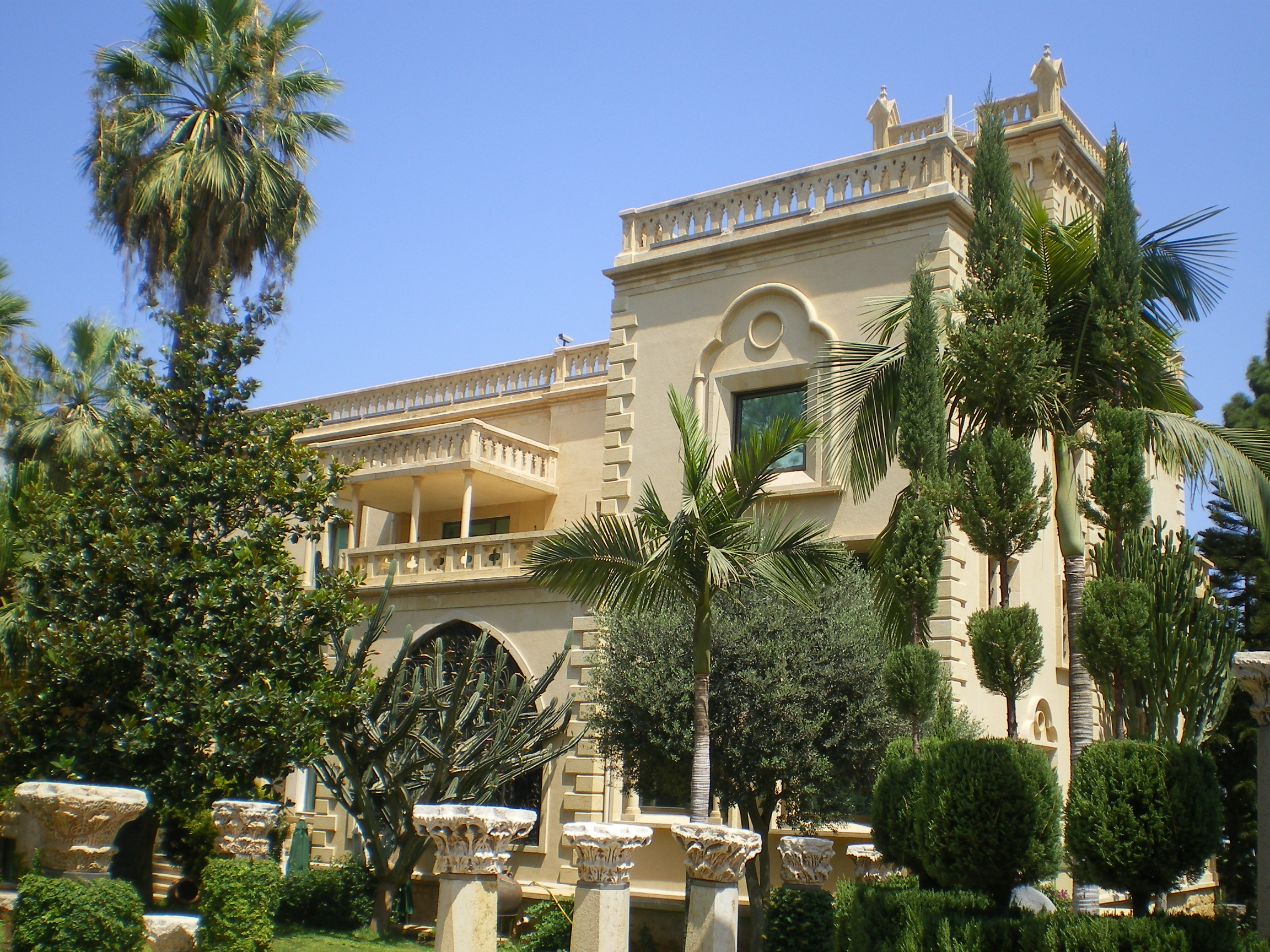
Pharaon's former house in Beirut

One of their palaces in Beirut was one of the landmarks of that city, and was partly destroyed during the civil war and later sold to the Saudi royal family.

His former Beirut residence is now the Robert Mouawad Private Museum, housing a collection of Arab, Greek and Byzantine antiquities. During his lifetime Pharaon gained an international reputation as a collector of art and antiquities, many of which he amassed at the mansion located at Beirut's Green Line. According to The New York Times, the residence is a "palace [which] resembles a Gothic castle with a hodgepodge of Greek and Roman statues and sarcophaguses in the walled garden."
