= Charles Corm =

Lebanese writer, industrialist, and philanthropist (1894–1963)

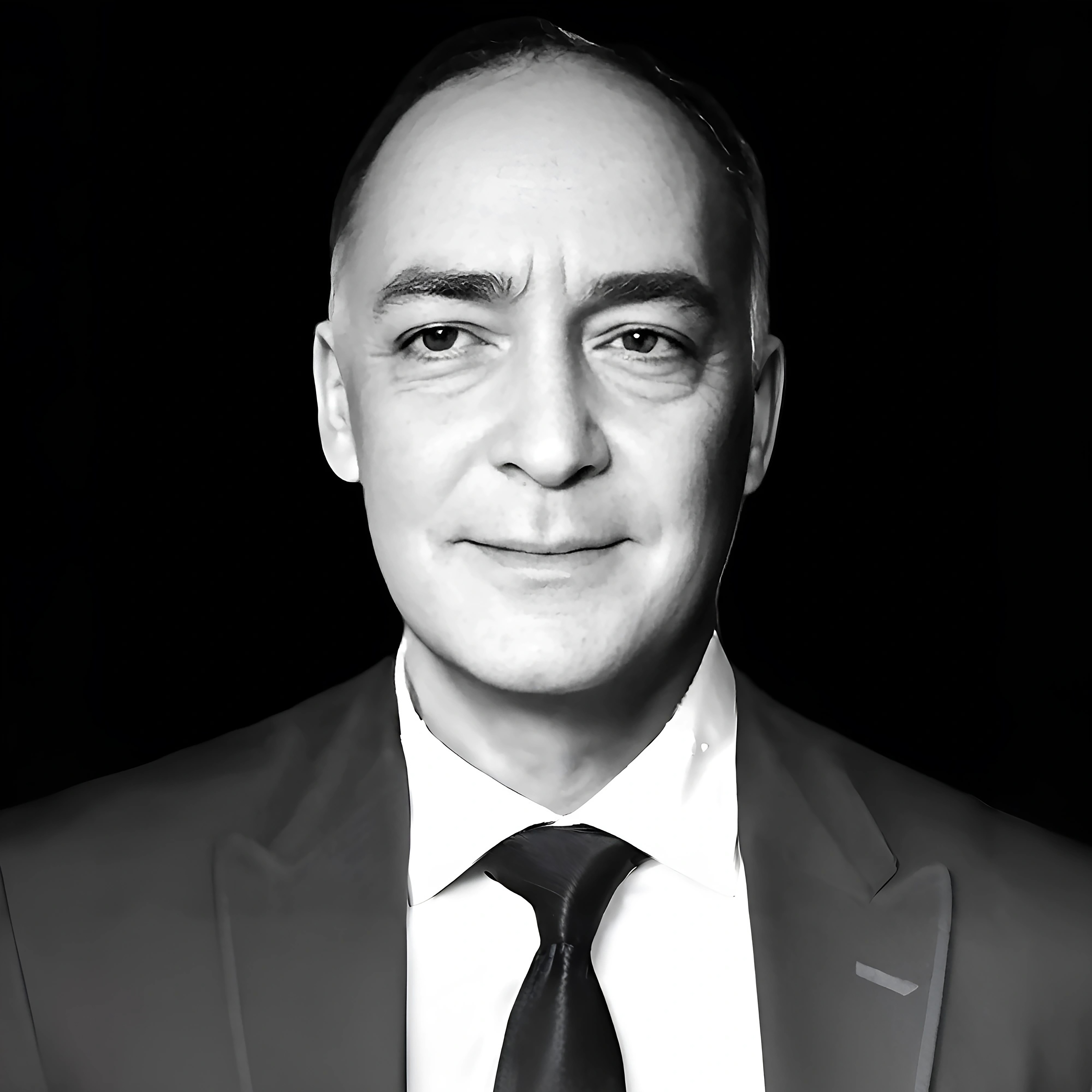
- Born: March 4, 1894; Beirut, Beirut Sanjak
- Died: September 19, 1963 (aged 69); Beirut, Lebanon
- Education: Collège Notre-Dame de Jamhour, Saint Joseph University of Beirut
- Occupations: Writer; industrialist; philanthropist
- Spouse: Samia Baroody
- Children: David, Hiram, Virginie, and Madeleine
- Relatives: Daoud Corm (father), Georges Corm (nephew)
- Writing career
- Notable works: The Sacred Mountain, 6000 Years of Peaceful Contributions to Mankind, Founder of La Revue Phénicienne
- Notable awards: Edgar Allan Poe International Prize of Poetry 1934

Charles Corm (1894–1963) was a Lebanese writer, industrialist, and philanthropist. He is considered to be the leader of the Phoenicianism movement in Lebanon, which ignited a surge of nationalism that led to Lebanon's independence. In a country torn by sectarian conflicts, his intention was to find a common root shared by all Lebanese beyond their religious beliefs. At the age of 40, he quit a successful business empire to dedicate his time to writing and philanthropy. In addition to his prolific literary legacy that can now be found in most libraries and universities around the world, Charles Corm left one of the most substantial fortunes in the Middle East.

== Writer ==
Although most Lebanese authors at the time wrote in Arabic, Corm mostly wrote in French. One of his main intellectual contributions is La Revue Phénicienne, a publication he founded in July 1919 in which many writers such as Michel Chiha and Said Akl took part and which inspired Lebanon's independence. Rushdy Maalouf, the father of Académie Française member and Francophone novelist Amin Maalouf, wrote: "Charles was the first one to show us how to love Lebanon, how to chant and rhapsodize Lebanon, how to vaunt and defend Lebanon, and how to become master-builders of this Lebanon."

His La Montagne Inspirée ("The Sacred Mountain" in English), earned him the Edgar Allan Poe International Prize of Poetry in 1934. Additionally, Corm, whose father Daoud Corm was a teacher and mentor to the young Khalil Gibran, was the French translator of Gibran's English masterpiece The Prophet.

== Industrialist ==
Upon graduation at the age of 18, Corm traveled to New York City where he rented a small office on Wall Street to conduct an import/export business. There he witnessed the boom in automobiles and Henri Ford’s incredible success. His American experience left an impression and, following the end of World War I Corm secured the Ford Motor Company dealership for the Middle East region, along with other big American companies like Firestone and Goodyear. In the years to come, these automobiles would contribute to developing roads and help introduce mechanized agriculture in a region scared by a recent famine.

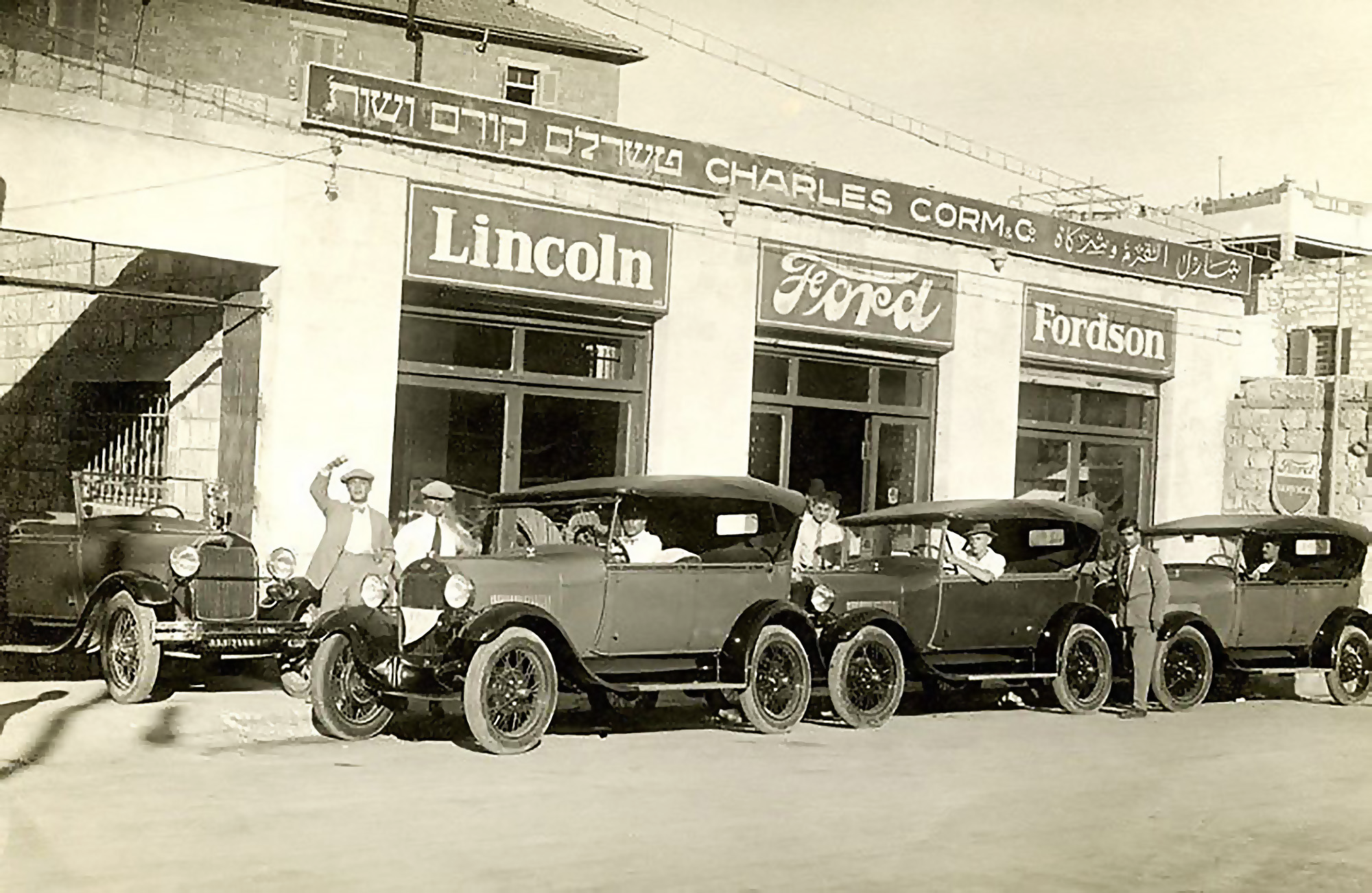
Charles Corm & Co, Haifa Showroom, 1929

In 1928, Corm designed the headquarters for his company, in a nod to the skyscrapers being built in America at the time. The building was erected in 1929 in Beirut, later becoming the Corm family home. It was one of Beirut’s first skyscrapers with a very large gardens containing a variety of artistic and archaeological relics as well as rare trees and native plants.

His wealth made, Corm decided to devote his life to literature and philanthropy on the occasion of his 40th birthday.

== Philanthropist ==
Corm helped found several Lebanese institutions, including the National Museum, the National Library and other state and cultural landmarks. He also personally oversaw the Lebanese pavilion at the 1939 World Fair in New York City, for which Mayor LaGuardia made him Citizen of Honor of New York City, the highest distinction given out by the city.

Corm's close friend Said Akl noted: "Charles not only was a guiding force behind Lebanon’s independence, he also helped lay Lebanon’s constitutional foundations and spent his own money building the political, social and cultural landmarks needed to support our vision of Lebanon. During those years, it seemed very clear to me that Charles did not care much about money. Rather, a deep sense of commitment to what he loved had rewarded him with outstanding success in both business and literature."

== Personal life ==
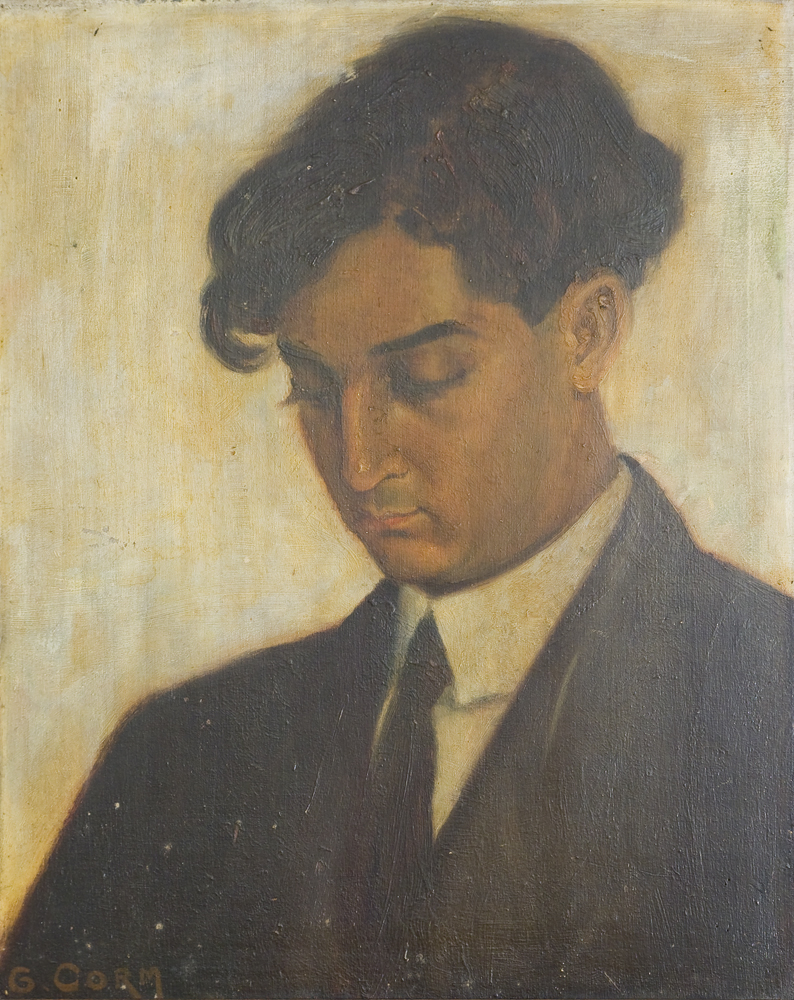
Portrait of Charles Corm by his brother Georges Daoud Corm (1925)

Charles Corm was born in 1894 in Beirut, Lebanon, the son of the famous Lebanese painter Daoud Corm. He graduated from the Jesuit College with high honors. At the age of 18, in 1912, he travelled to New York. To survive, he set up an import/export business on Broadway. As his first language was French, he resolutely attended the same Broadway show again and again until he had learned the basics of New York English. In 1934, at age 40, he left business for a life of literature and philanthropy.

Back in Beirut's golden years, Rushdy Maalouf also noted that it was not unusual for artists, intellectuals and business, political and cultural figures visiting Lebanon for the first time to have Charles Corm and his home, which hosted grandiose parties, on their itinerary of people and places to see: "they visited Lebanon seeking Charles Corm the same way some of us may visit Athens to see the Acropolis. This is the veneration that many, Lebanese and foreigners alike, held for Charles Corm and is so present in his mystique".

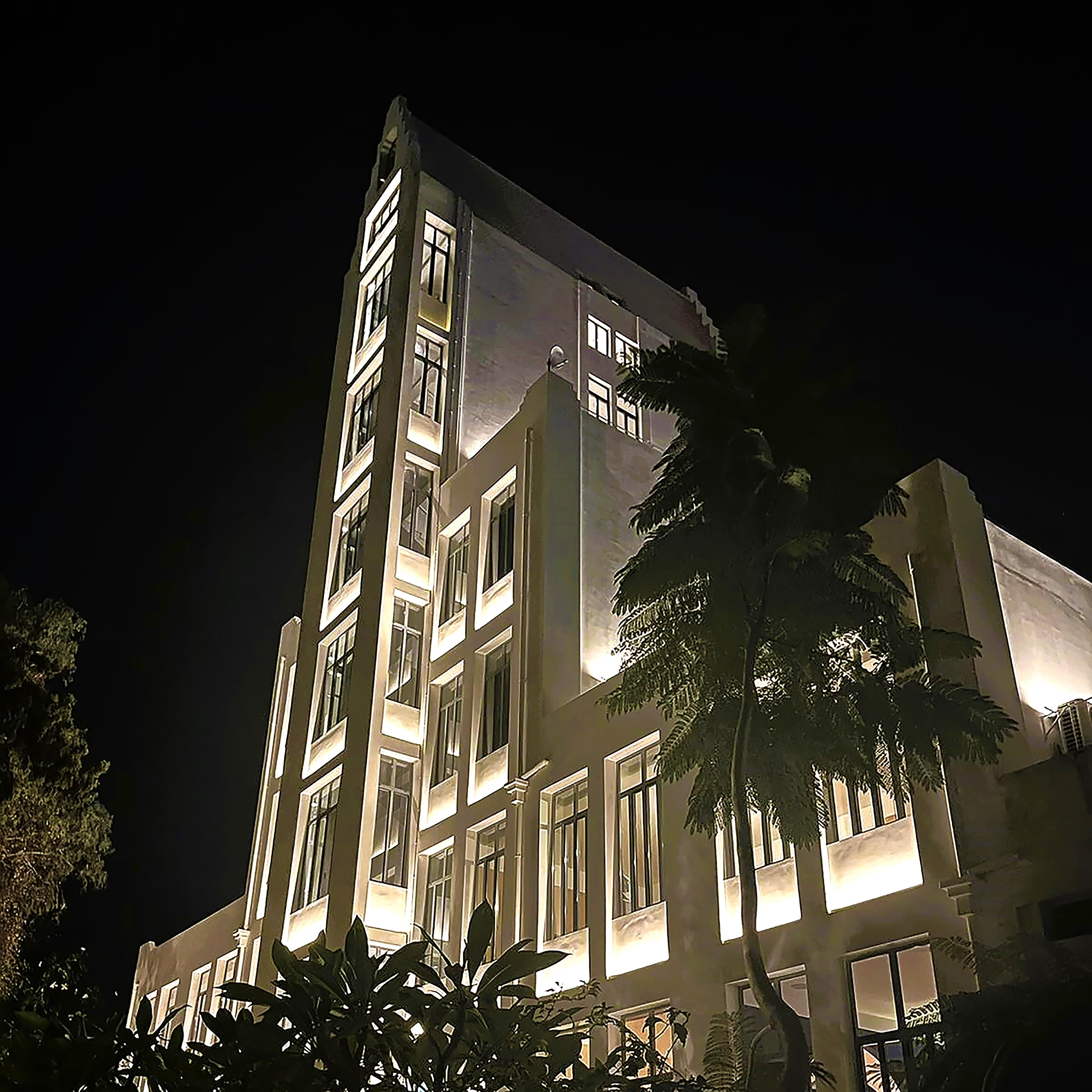
Charles Corm Building, 2024

An uncommitted bachelor for most of his life, Charles Corm finally married Samia Baroody in 1935. Samia Baroody had been the first Miss Lebanon and took second place in the 1934 Miss Universe pageant in New York City. Charles Corm and his wife Samia went on to have four children: David (who married Maya Shahid, daughter of Dr Munib Shahid and Serene al-Husayni), Hiram, Virginie and Madeleine.

== Works ==
- La Revue Phénicienne
- La Montagne Inspirée, Edgar Allan Poe International Poetry Prize 1934 (translated into English under the title "The Sacred Mountain")
- 6000 ans de Génie Pacifique au Service de l'Humanité (translated into English under the title "6000 Years of Peaceful Contributions to Mankind")
- Contes Erotiques (translated into English under the title "Erotic Tales")
- Les Cahiers de l'Enfant
- Sonnets Adolescents
- La Montagne Parfumée
- L'Eternel Féminin
- Médaillons en Musique de l'Ame Libanaise
- Petite Cosmogonie Sentimentale
- La Planète Exaltée
- Le Mystère de l'Amour
- La Symphonie de la Lumière
- La Terre Assassinée ou Les Ciliciennes
- Le Volcan Embrasé

== Honors and awards ==
- Edgar Allan Poe International Prize of Poetry 1934.
- Citizen of Honor of New York City, USA.
- Medal of Honor of the Académie Française 1950, France.
- Fellow of the Royal Society, England.
- Grand Commander of the American International Academy, USA.
- Commander of the Order of Human Merit, Switzerland.
- Commander of the Humanitarian Society of Belgium.
- Grand Officer of the National Order of the Cedar, Lebanon.
- Grand Officer of the French Poets' Society.
- Grand Officer of the Order of Saint Brigite, Sweden.
- Grand Officer of the Italian Academic Order, Italy.
- Grand Officer of the Instituto Panamericana de Culture, Argentina.
- Grand Officer of the Academia de Bellas Artes, Spain.
- Grand Officer of the Sociedade Brasileira de Civismo, Brazil.
- Grand Officer of the Casa Americana, Peru.
- Gold Medal of New York City for Distinguished Services, USA.
