= Bmakine =

Village in Aley District in the Mount Lebanon Governorate of Lebanon

Bmakine بمكين
- Town
- Bmakine shown within Lebanon
- Coordinates: 33°47′49″N 35°34′13″E
- Country: Lebanon
- Governorate: Mount Lebanon
- District: Aley
- City: Aley

Area
  - Total: 1.11 km^{2} (0.43 sq mi)
- Elevation: 700 m (2,300 ft)
- Time zone: UTC+2 (EET)
  - Summer (DST): UTC+3 (EEST)
- ISO 3166 code: LB

Bmakine (Arabic: بمكين, romanized: Bmakīn) is a village in the Aley District of Lebanon. It is 700 meters above sea level.

== Location and geography ==
Bmakine lies on a hill in Aley, overlooking the Mediterranean sea from the west, 20 minutes away from Beirut, the Lebanese capital.

== History ==
In 1838, Eli Smith noted the place, called Bmikkin, located in El-Ghurb el-Fokany, upper el-Ghurb.

== See also ==
- List of cities in Lebanon

== Bibliography ==
- Robinson, E.; Smith, E. (1841). Biblical Researches in Palestine, Mount Sinai and Arabia Petraea: A Journal of Travels in the year 1838. Vol. 3. Boston: Crocker & Brewster.
