= Daoud Corm =

Lebanese painter

- داود قرم
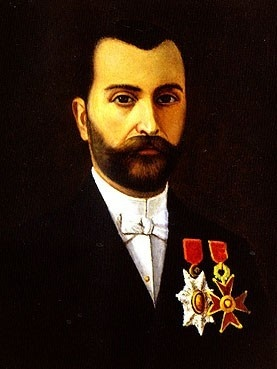
- 1900 self-portrait
- Born: Daoud Corm; 26 June 1852; Ghosta, Lebanon
- Died: 6 June 1930 (aged 77)
- Education: Accademia di San Luca
- Known for: Painting
- Spouse: Virgine Naaman
- Awards: Prize of Honor of Excellence, 1900 Paris Exhibition
- Patrons: Elias Peter Hoayek, Sursock family.

Daoud Corm (Arabic: داود قرم, romanized: Dāwūd Corm; 26 June 1852 – 6 June 1930), also known as David Corm in English, was an influential Lebanese painter and the father of writer, industrialist, and philanthropist Charles Corm. He was a teacher and mentor to the young Khalil Gibran as well as Khalil Saleeby and Habib Srour.

In 1870 he went to Rome and enrolled at the Accademia di San Luca where he trained under Roberto Bompiani, the Italian court painter. During his five years in Italy, Daoud Corm studied the works of Renaissance artists whose influence was evident throughout his works. He gained official recognition when he was commissioned to paint a portrait of Pope Pius IX (reg 1846–78). Upon his return to Lebanon in 1875, he painted portraits of many Arabs including Abbas II of Egypt (reg 1892–1914) in 1894. Daoud Corm was a religious painter and there are many of his paintings in churches across Lebanon, Syria, Egypt and Palestine.

In 1912, Corm expanded his artistic enterprise and its public appeal when he opened Maison d'Art, an art supply store and art studio centrally located near Beirut's post office. Its significant commercial success indicated a growing public interest not only in art viewing but also in art making. Corm exhibited his work abroad in Egypt and Europe, most notably at the 1889 Versailles Exhibition in France and at the 1900 Paris Exhibition, where he received the Prize of Honor of Excellence. Additional recognition of his career includes receipt of the Lebanese Order of Merit and the Ottoman Medal of Glory. In 1930, Daoud Corm died in Beirut at age 77.

== Early life ==
Daoud was born in the town of Ghosta, Mount Lebanon, in 1852. He was one of three children born to an affluent family of scribes and clerks. His father Sham'un [Simeon] Hokayem, also known by his court title al-Chidiac, was a child prodigy, an accomplished polymath and a polyglot. His mother was from the village of Ghazir. The teenage Sham'un was enlisted as a clerk to Emir Bashir Shihab II and as a tutor to his children. The young princes were contemptuous of their adolescent teacher who lost his temper because of his pupils' constant defiance and slapped the eldest of them in the face. When confronted by Emir Bashir, Sham'un exhibited courage and rectitude and justified his act by saying that it was his duty to tutor and educate the princes so that they become worthy of their father's standing. The impressed Emir Bachir replied to Sham'un "by God, you are truly one valiant spirited steed!" and rewarded him with a large purse of gold coins and a permanent appointment as court clerk and instructor which Sham'un would occupy for the next eighteen years of his life. From then on Sham'un was known as Al-Corm (or Al-Qurm meaning "The Trunk"), an epithet and title that stuck to him and eventually turned to be a retronym, replacing his Hokayem surname. Daoud's mother, Marie Hani, was maid of honor to Emir Bachir's second wife.

Early biographers relate that friars from the Jesuit College of Ghazir discovered Daoud's drawing skill when he was only nine years old. Corm's talent was furthered in his apprenticeship in the Jesuit college, where the friars pushed him to pursue painting studies in Rome's fine art academy.

== In Europe (1870–1878) ==
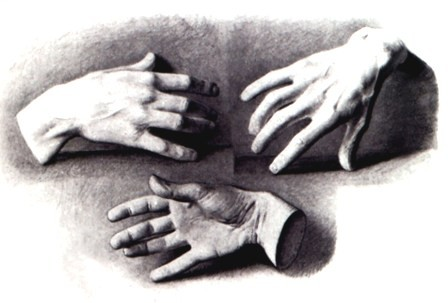
Sketch by Daoud Corm during his studies in Accademia di San Luca in Rome. (c. 1870–1875)

Corm sold a number of paintings to a local Maronite church to pay for his travels to Rome. In 1870, after several days of foot travel, the eighteen years old Corm arrived in Beirut where he boarded a French ship headed to Naples. He traveled by train from Naples to Rome and resided in the Maronite seminary along with his future patron and Maronite patriarch Elias Peter Hoayek. Corm sought to study under Roberto Bompiani, professor and director of the Accademia di San Luca; he repetitively visited Bompiani's house but the latter's servants did not allow him an interview. Frustrated after weeks of failed attempts, Corm threw down his portfolio and quarreled with the professor's servants. Bompiani was alerted by the commotion and came out to find the foreign looking man disheveled and his paintings scattered on the floor. The professor picked up one of Daoud's paintings and recognizing the young man's potential, he took him under his tutelage. Corm spent the next several years studying at the academy and visiting museums and churches and copying the works of the Renaissance masters.

On 24 July 1874, Daoud dispatched a letter to his family informing them that his travel companion to Rome, father Rukoz, promised to introduce him to pope Pius IX. Corm's request to paint the pope and send the portrait back to his parents in Mount Lebanon was met with refusal. Despite this setback, Corm drew the pope the same night from memory. Bompiani was impressed by his student's feat and presented the finished portrait to pope Pius who blessed the painting. The portrait is now part of Vatican Library collection. After his training in Rome, Daoud moved to Belgium where he served as one of the official painters to the Belgian royal family under Leopold II.

== In Beirut (1878–1930) ==
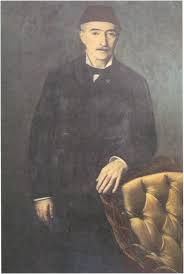
Portrait of Khalil Bey Sursock, a Beiruti aristocrat and philanthropist, 1882. oil on canvas, 130 x 100 cm, Emile Hannouche Museum collection, Chtaura

Between 1839 and 1876 the Ottomans issued a series of reforms (the Tanzimat) that brought changes to Beirut's political and administrative roles. The reforms, along with low import duties for foreign merchants, (Note: Low import duties applied for foreign merchants was a result of the Treaty of Balta Liman.) the establishment of the Ottoman Imperial Bank in 1850, the building of the new wharf, the construction of the Beirut-Damascus road and the population surge following the 1860 Lebanon conflict made Beirut the unrivaled port city of the Levant. The flourishing city attracted a host of families migrating from Aleppo, Damascus, Tripoli, Acre, Sidon and Mount Lebanon to join the growing community of Beirut's merchant families. Corm sought the favors and patronage of this class of bourgeois merchants when he settled back in Beirut in 1878. To appeal to the Beiruti nobility, Corm engaged Félix Bonfils' studio to take a photograph of him applying the finishing touches to Pope Pius IX's portrait and used this photograph as his calling card. By using a business card of him portraying the pope, Corm aimed to sell for a bourgeois artist whose artistic aptitude and western education was endorsed by the foremost potico-religious leader of the time.
Among Corm's first aristocratic Beiruti clients were the Sursocks a rich Greek Orthodox merchant family that demonstrated its cultural capital by investing in art patronage. Corm was commissioned portraits for Khalil Bey Sursock in 1882, Mahjet Sursock in 1892, Moussa Sursock and his wife Anasthasia Dagher in 1897. Other clients were no less notable and included Hussein Beyhum, the president of the Syrian scientific association and deputy in the Ottoman house of representatives; Jurji Zaydan, novelist and journalist, most noted for his creation of the al-Hilal magazine; Viscount Philippe de Tarrazi (1917), a polymath, philanthropist, the founder of the National Library of Lebanon and the curator of the National Museum; Butrus al-Bustani a leading figure in the al-Nahda literary movement, and Ibrahim al- Yaziji an illustrious philologist and journalist.

Corm benefited from the growing interest in art in Beirut and facilitated the spread of the craft by opening an art supply shop in the center of Beirut in 1912. His shop, called Maison d'Art (House of art) was a commercial success and later included a darkroom for developing pictures of the first handheld cameras. Corm himself took interest in the newly introduced technology and took photographs of his family.

== Style and influence ==
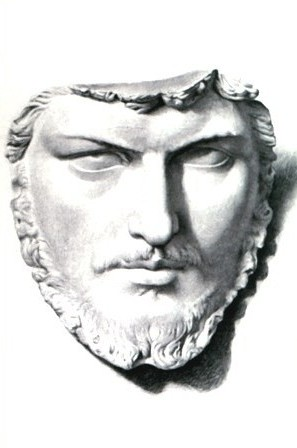
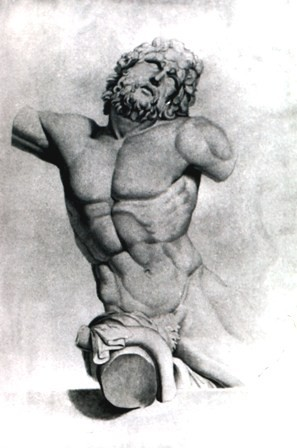
Two of the sketches drawn by Corm during his stay in Rome.

During his formative years in Rome, Corm spent much of his time in the city's museums copying the facial expressions and hand gestures of the Renaissance masters' works. This emphasis on human anatomy and the formal traces of Renaissance masters is apparent in Corm's portraiture. Corm painted his subjects in a three-quarter view in soft light against a dark background. He paid particular attention to the details of his subjects' social and professional standing. In addition to portraits, Corm painted few landscapes and genre scenes on spec because of the limited market for these types of paintings; in contrast to his portraits, Corm's genre scenes are described as theatrical and overly staged as evident in his Bedouin woman with her child 1900 painting.

Along with artists, Mustafa Farrukh (1901–1957), Omar Onsi (1901–1969), César Gemayel (Qaisarr Jumayil) (1898–1958), Saliba Douaihy (Saliba Duwaihi) (b. 1915) and Rachid Wehbi (Rachid Wahbah) (b. 1917), Corm is regarded as a pioneer, having laid the foundations for a modern Lebanese arts movement. This group of artists defied the imposed emphasis on religious works, and instead established an originality and freedom of expression that had never before been seen in Lebanon.

=== Religious paintings ===
Corm's first client was the Maronite church especially under the patronage of then Maronite patriarch Elias Peter Hoayek, his once travel companion to Italy. He painted a great number of religious works that are found not only in his native Lebanon but also in neighboring Syria, Egypt and Palestine. According to Lahoud, Corm rid Lebanese religious art from a traditionalist, local neo-gothic style and, by introducing classical painting, started a movement of academic art-making in Beirut.

== Gallery ==
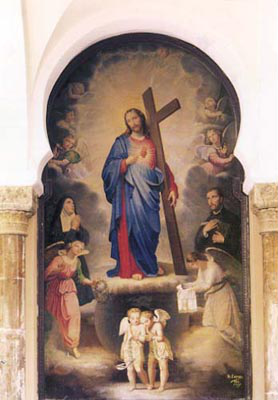
The Sacred Heart of Jesus (1880)

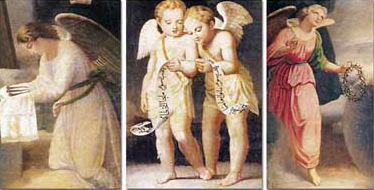
Detail of The Sacred Heart of Jesus (1880)

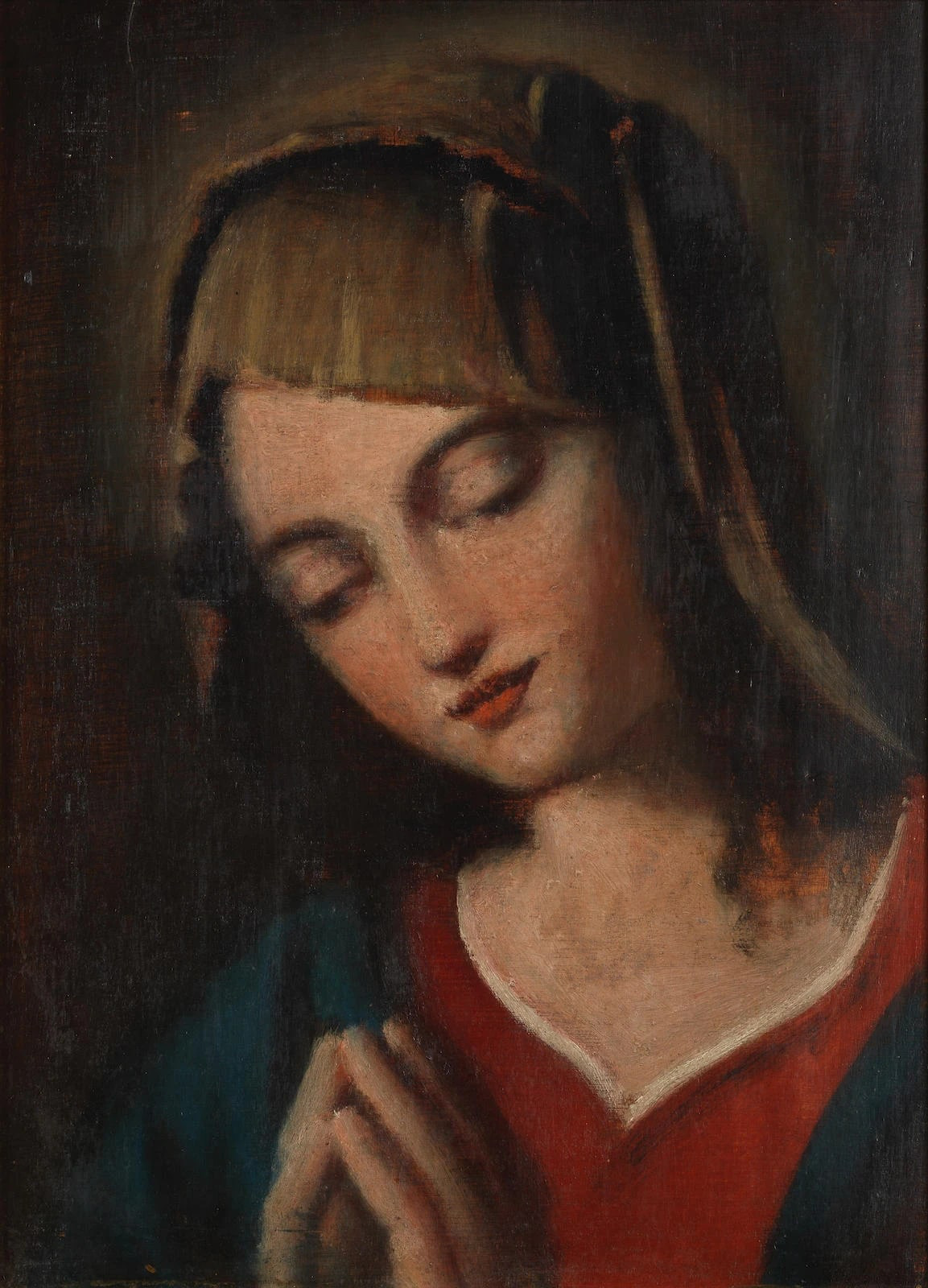
The Madonna of Bikfaya (c. 1890s)

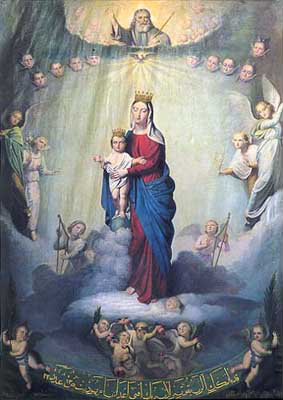
Our Lady of Victory (1887)

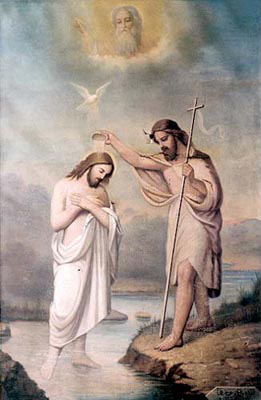
Saint John the Baptist (1923)

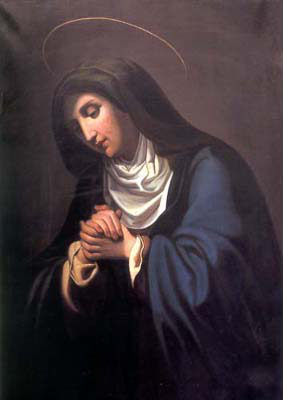
The Mourning Virgin (c. late 19th-early 20th century)

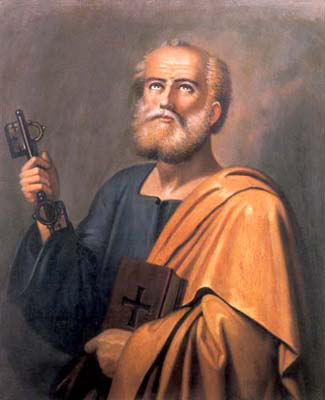
Saint Peter (c. late 19th-early 20th century)

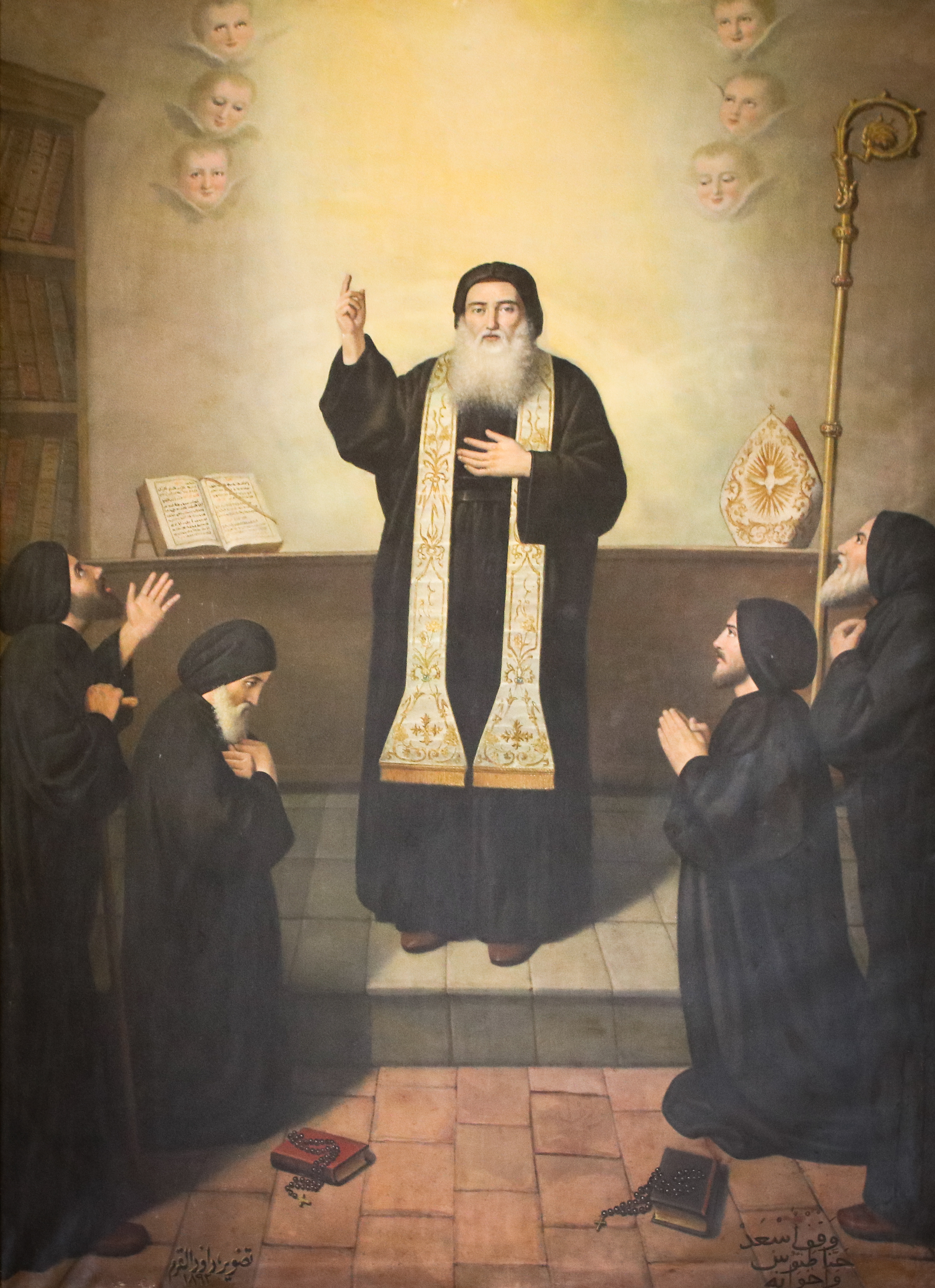
Saint Maron (1863)

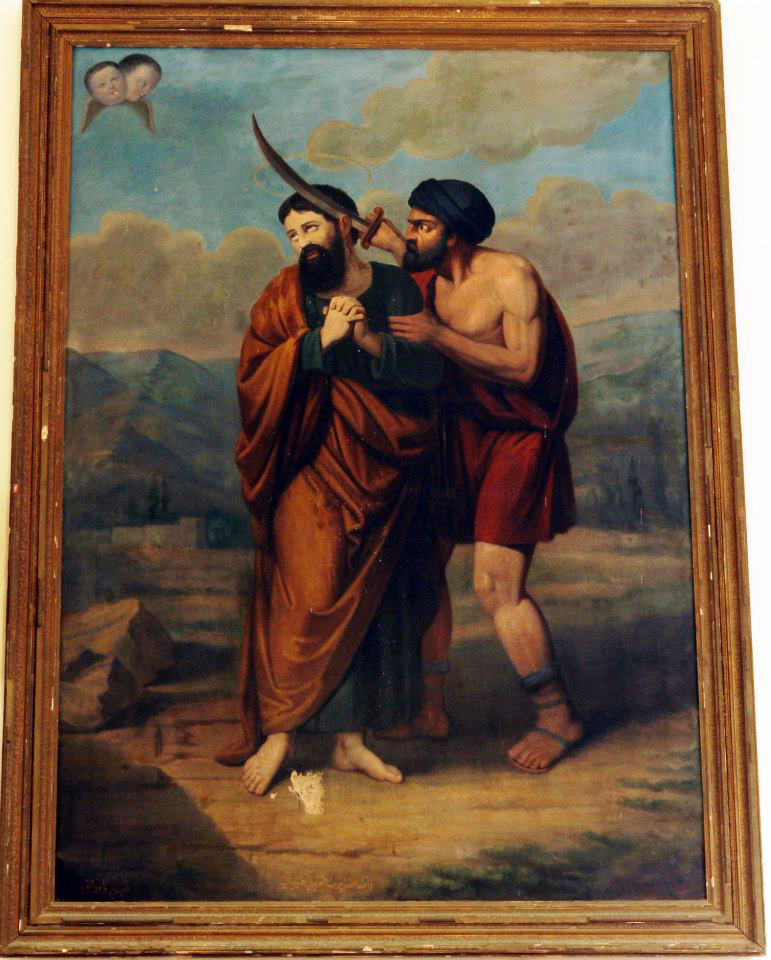
Saint Edna (1884)

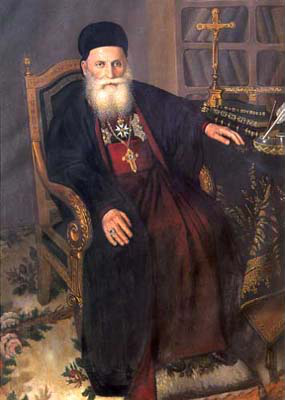
Patriarch Boulos Massaad (1884)

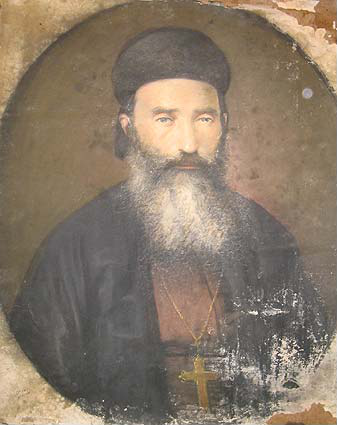
Priest Youhanna El Hage (c. late 19th-early 20th century)

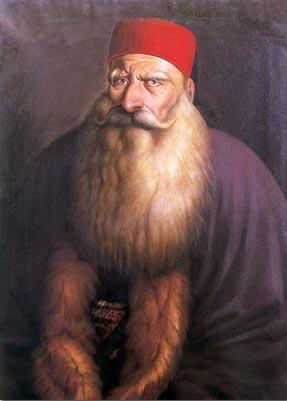
Emir Bashir Shihab II (c. late 19th-early 20th century)

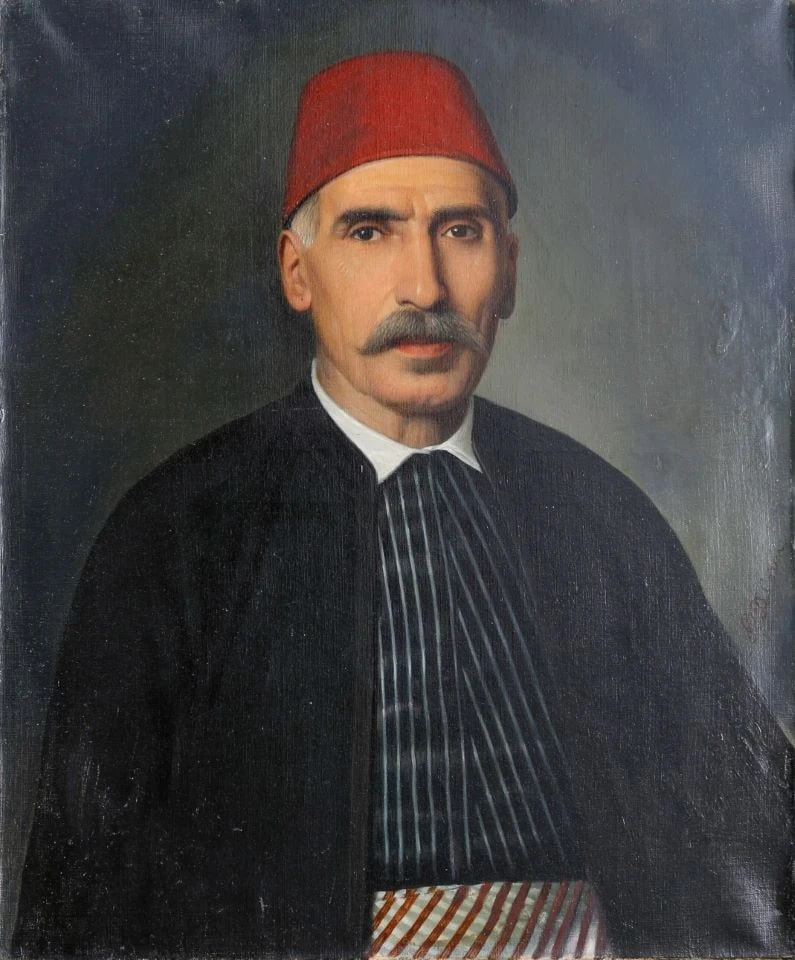
Portrait of a Lebanese nobleman (c. late 19th-early 20th century)

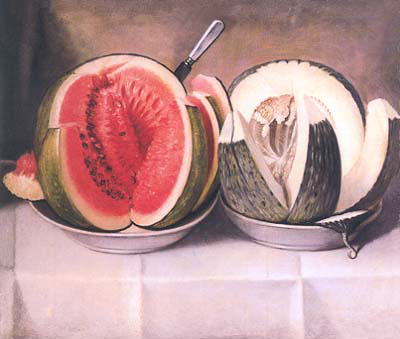
Still life - The Watermelon (c. late 19th-early 20th century)

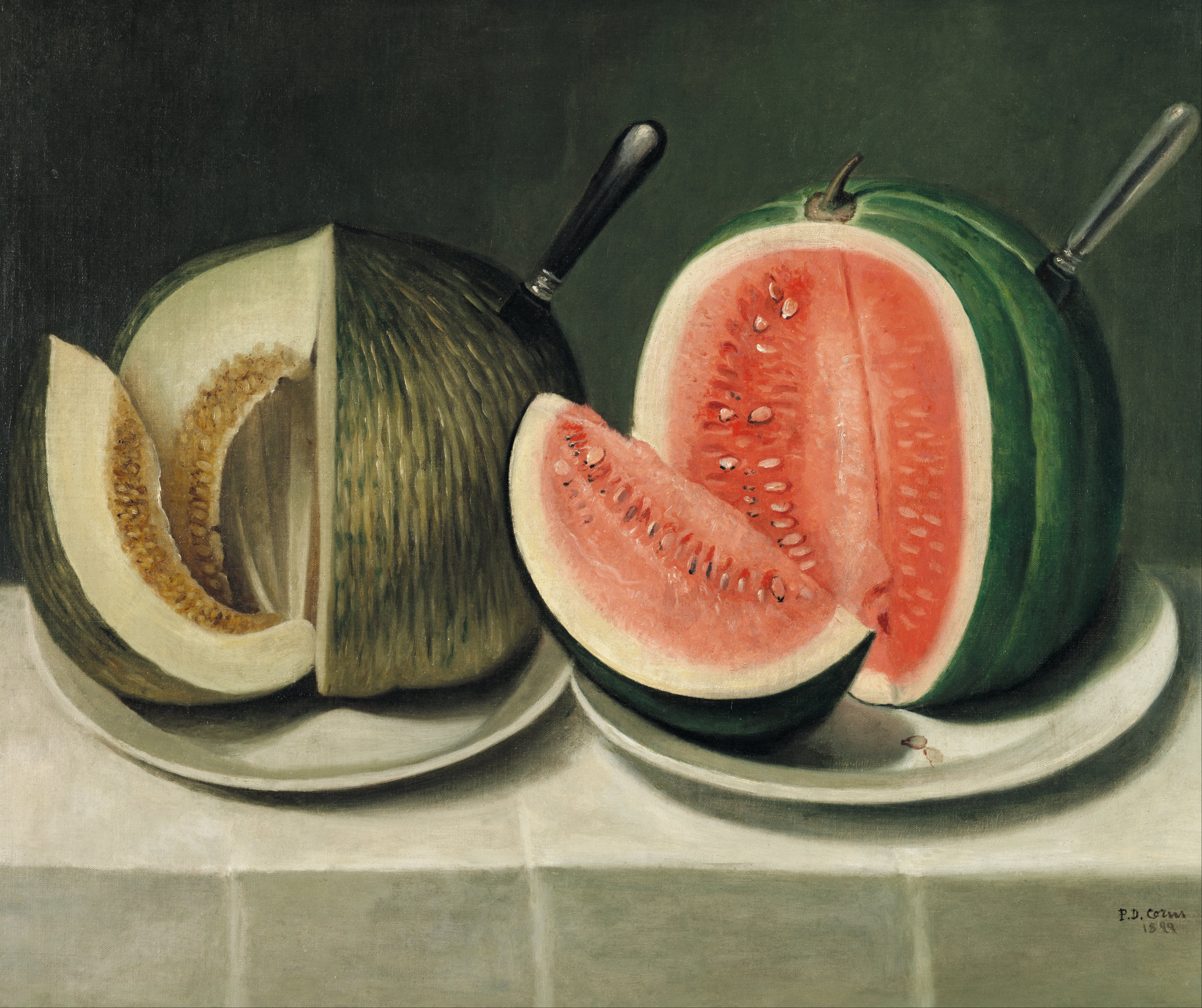
Melons (1899)

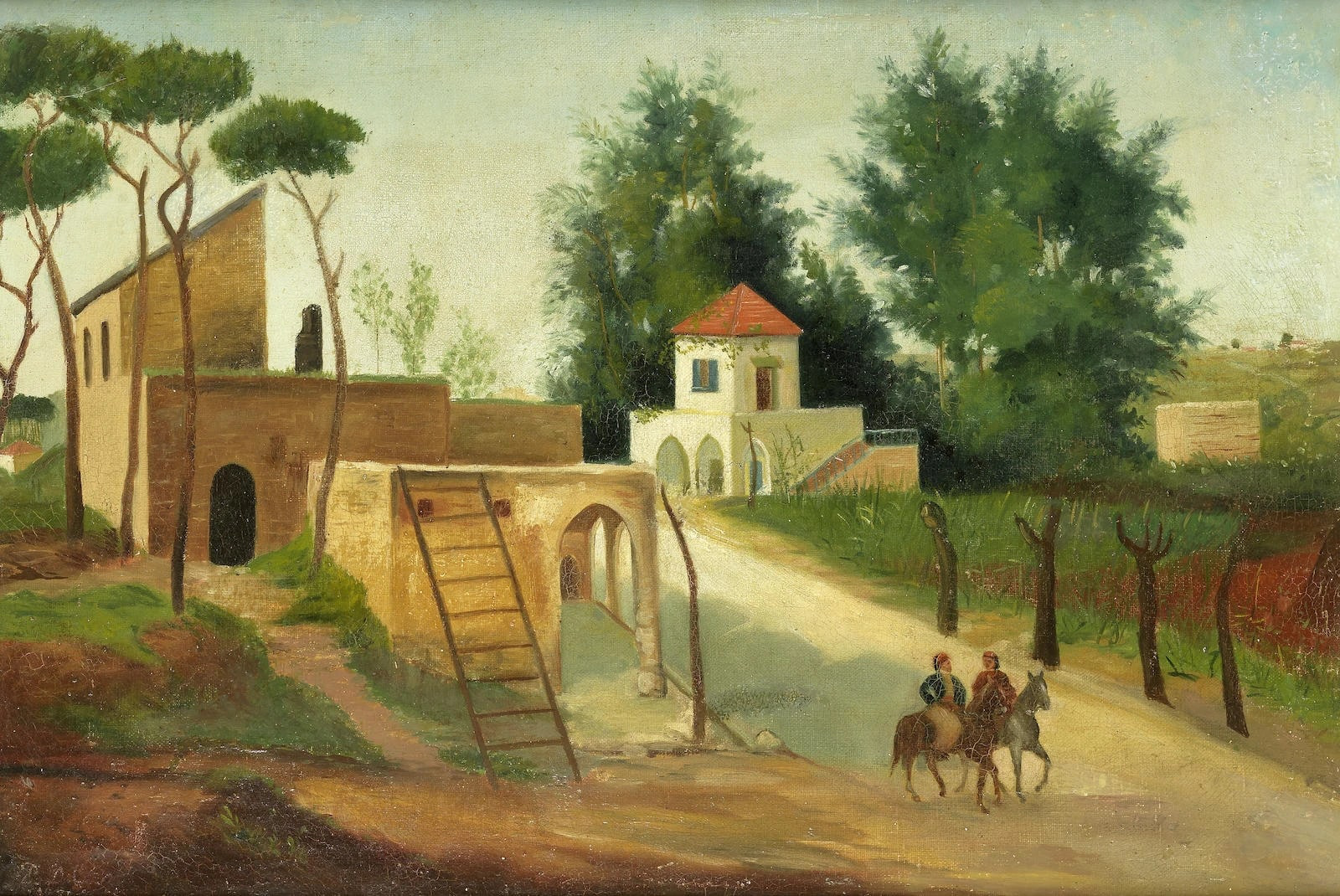
View of Achrafieh (1881)

== Bibliography ==
- Abillama, Nour and Tomb, Marie (2012). Art from Lebanon. Beirut, Lebanon: Wonderful Editions. ISBN 9789953024202. OCLC 922089081.
- Kaufman, Asher (2014). Reviving Phoenicia: The search for identity in Lebanon. London: I.B.Tauris. p. 288. ISBN 9781780767796.
- Lahoud, Edouard (1974). Contemporary art in Lebanon. Beirut: Librairie Orientale. pp. 1–9. ISBN 9782721469007.
- Malouf, Bishara (1944). "The birth of painting in Lebanon". The Eastern Times (1).
- Mohasseb, Nadine (1998). Daoud Corm, 1852–1930. Beirut: Dar al-Mu'allef.
- Öztürk, Pelin Kihtir (September 2006). Urban transformation of Ottoman port cities in the nineteenth century: change from Ottoman Beirut to French mandatory Beirut (PDF) (M.Sc. thesis). Middle East technical university.
- Rogers, Sarah (2010). "Daoud Corm, cosmopolitan nationalism, and the origins of Lebanese modern art". The Arab Studies Journal. 18 (1): 46–77. JSTOR 27934078.
- Salameh, Franck (2010). Language, Memory, and Identity in the Middle East: The Case for Lebanon. Lexington Books. ISBN 9780739137406.
- Salameh, Franck (2015). Charles Corm: An intellectual biography of a twentieth-century Lebanese "Young Phoenician". The Levant and Near East: A multidisciplinary book series. Plymouth: Lexington Books. ISBN 9780739184011.
- Samaha, Nour (4 June 2007), "Aristocrats and landscapes: Georges Daoud Corm's lives in art come back to life", The Daily Star, Beirut
- Sheehi, Stephen (2006). "Modernism, anxiety and the ideology of Arab vision". Discourse. 28 (1): 72–97. JSTOR 41389741.
- Sheehi, Stephen (2016). The Arab Imago: A social history of portrait photography, 1860-1910. Princeton University Press. ISBN 9780691151328.
- Tomb, Marie (2013). Daoud Corm 1852-1930. Beirut: Éditions de la Revue phénicienne.
