= Roberto Bompiani =

Italian painter and sculptor

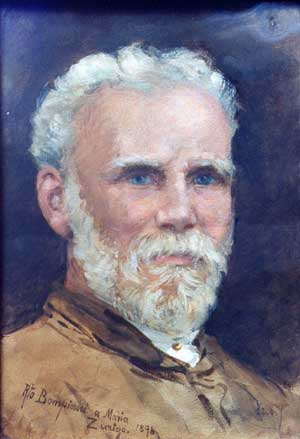
Self-portrait

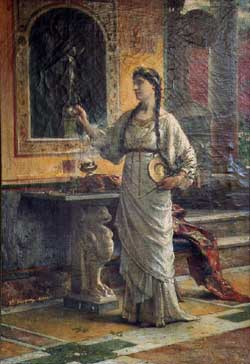
Pompeian Figure

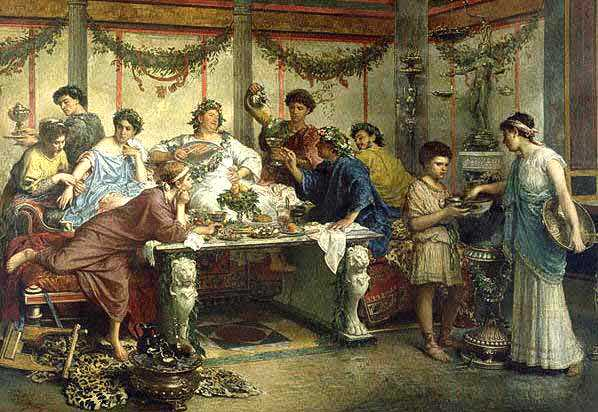
Parassita

Roberto Bompiani (February 10, 1821 – January 19, 1908) was an Italian painter and sculptor.

Bompiani was born in Rome. By the age of fifteen, he had enrolled at the Accademia di San Luca in Rome, where in 1836 he shared a first prize with fellow student in design, Angelo Valeriani. By 1839, he was able to win prizes both in sculpture and painting at the Accademia. He was remarkably prolific, especially as a painter. He is particularly known for paintings of scenes from ancient Rome, for which he gained the nickname "the Italian Bouguereau".

Among his sculptural works, almost all from 1865–1870, are Sappho (Palazzo Castellani, Rome), Ruth, and the statuettes Amore che cerca chi deve ferire and Alexander tames Bucephalus.

Among his paintings are a Portrait of Queen Margherita (1878) at the Palazzo di Montecitorio; Portraits of the Borghese family; Portrait of Signora Liverani (1866, Galleria Nazionale d'Arte Moderna, Rome); Portrait of Marchese Ferrajoli; Portrait of his wife (1873); Diana and Actaeon; Dance and Tragedy for the Theater of Santiago de Chile; and two canvases for a church in Santiago: Ascencion of the Virgin and Crown of Thorns. He also painted frescoes in San Lorenzo in Lucina; frescoes in Santa Maria in Trastevere: San Romano Martyr; and the fresco on the portico of the Cemetery of Campo Verano: Moses' Curse: Death of the First-born of Egypt.

In 1876, at the Philadelphia's Centennial Exhibition, Bompiani exhibited a Roman girl placing garlands on the bust of his father and the Suonatore di Tibia (Flutist). These were the first of his popular Pompeian works. He painted Catullus at the banks of the Tiber, l'Affissatore pompeiano, the Triclinium, and a partita a gli astragali.

He exhibited at the Mostra internazionale of Vienna where he won an award for his portrait of Giovanni Battista Canevari (1872), that now hangs at the Accademia di San Luca.

He rose to become professor and president of the Accademia di San Luca in Rome. Both his son, Augusto Bompiani, and his daughter, Clelia Bompiani, were also painters.
