= Clelia Bompiani =

Italian painter

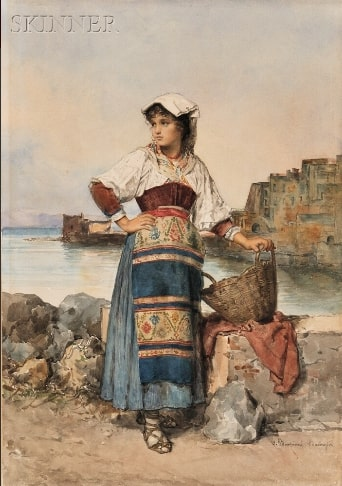
"Sul lungomare"

Clelia Bompiani-Battaglia (5 August 1848 in Rome – 23 February 1927 in Rome) was an Italian painter.

She was a pupil of her father, Roberto Bompiani, and of the professors in the Accademia di San Luca. She was an accomplished watercolorist.

The following paintings in watercolor established her reputation as an artist: Confidential Communication ( (1885); the Fortune-Teller (1887); A Public Copyist (1888); and The Wooing (1888).

Along with Alceste Campriani, Ada Negri, Juana Romani, and Erminia de Sanctis, Bompiani is named as one of Italy's best modern painters.

== Gallery ==
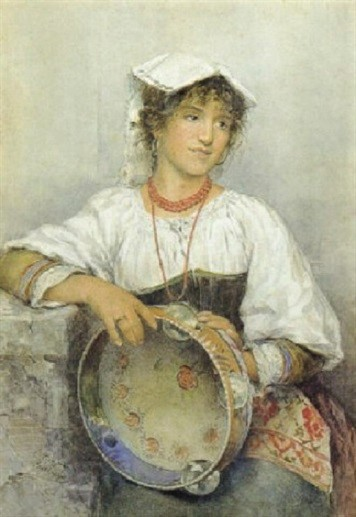
Woman with tambourine

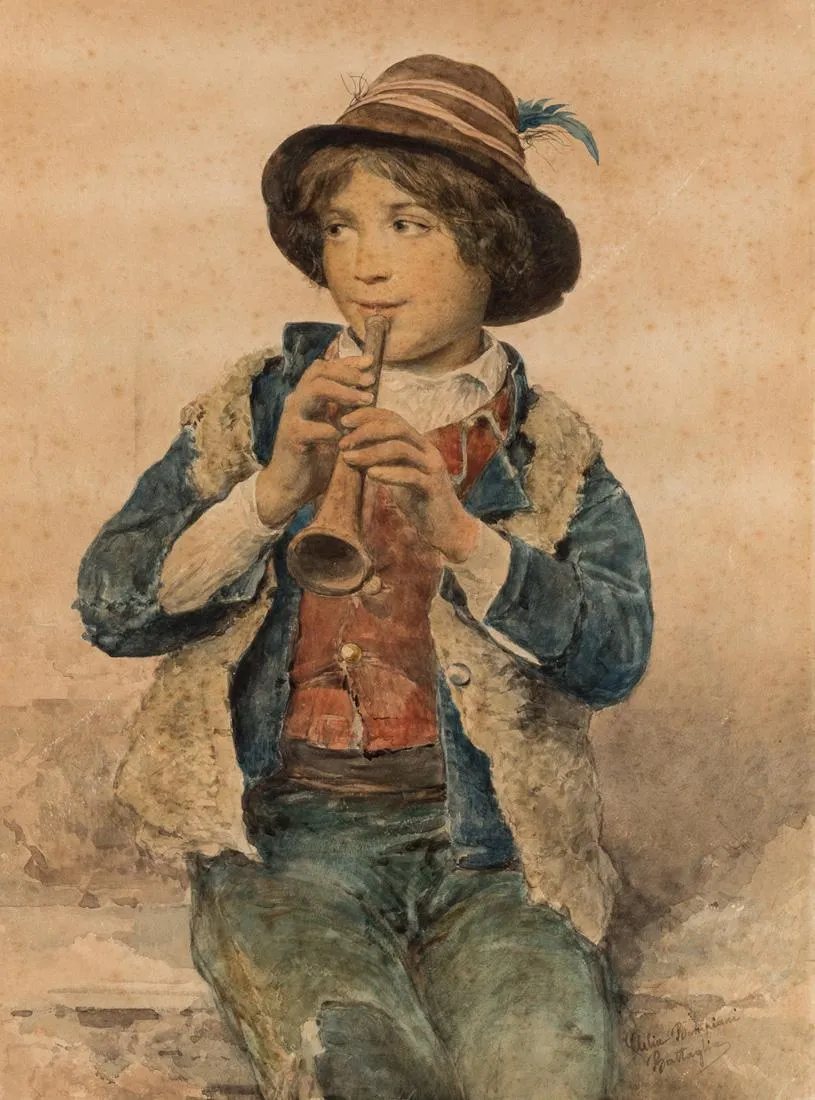
Shepherd Boy

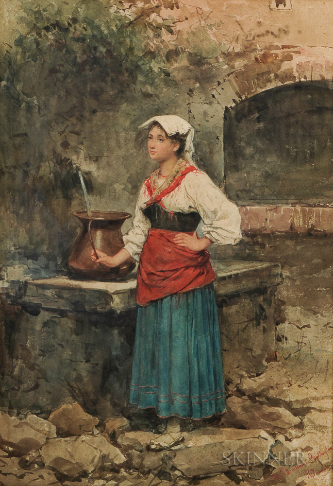
Italian Peasant Woman at a Well
