= Druze =

Ethnoreligious group of the Levant

Druze Al-Muwaḥḥidūn الموحدون
- Druze star and Druze flag

Total population
- 800,000–2,000,000

Founder
- Hamza ibn Ali ibn Ahmad

Regions with significant populations
- Syria: 700,000 (pre-war)
- Lebanon: 250,000
- Israel: 152,000
- Venezuela: 60,000
- United States: 50,000
- Canada: 25,000
- Jordan: 20,000
- Germany: 10,000
- Australia: 4,268

Religions
- Druze

Scriptures
- Epistles of Wisdom (Rasāʾil al-Ḥikma)

Languages
- Levantine Arabic; Hebrew (L2)

Druze faith
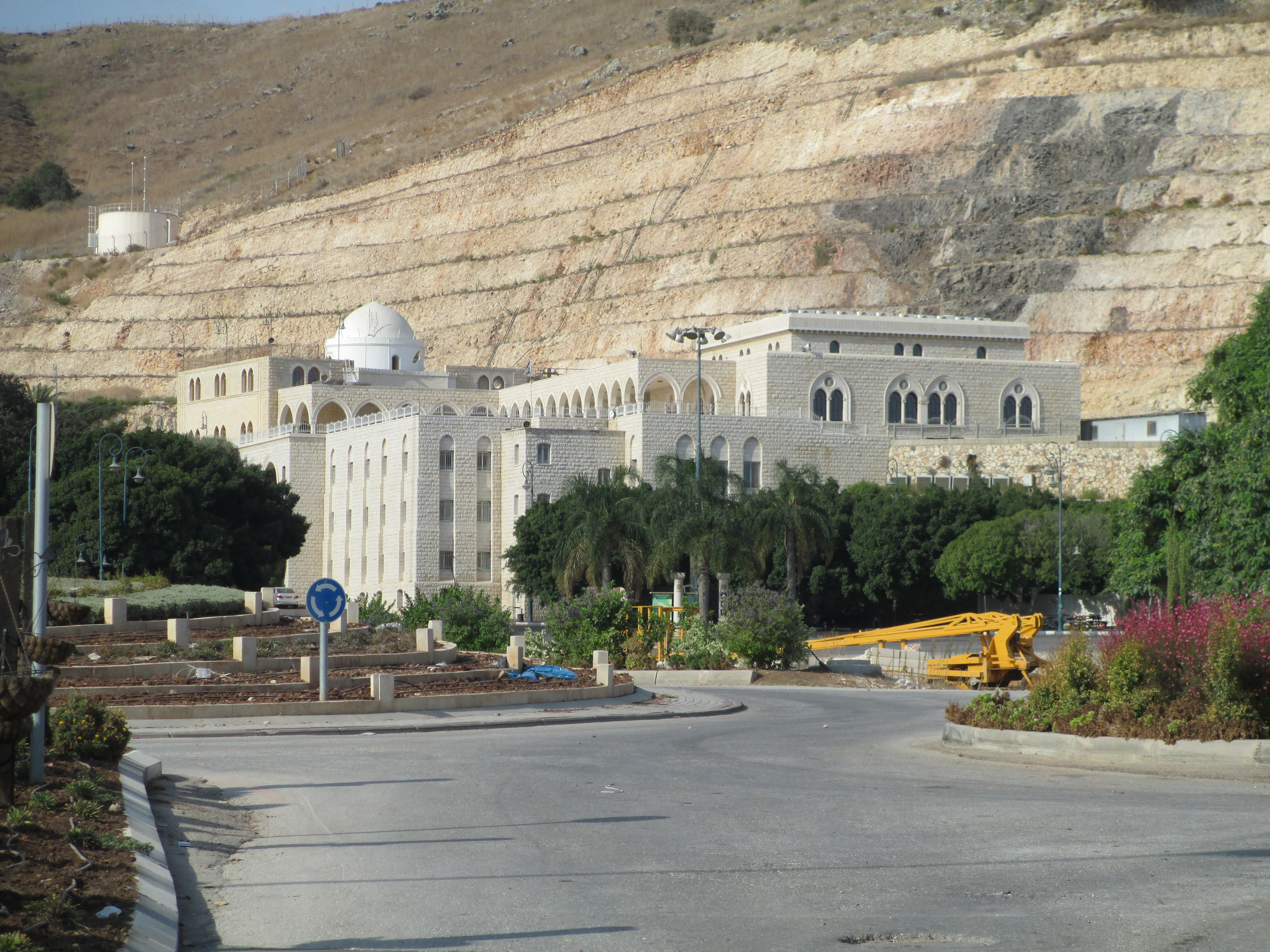
- The Shrine of Shu'ayb near Hittin in the Galilee, Israel
- Type: Ethno-esoteric religion
- Classification: Abrahamic
- Scripture: Epistles of Wisdom (Rasāʾil al-Ḥikma)
- Theology: Monotheistic
- Region: Syria, Lebanon, Israel, Jordan, and diaspora
- Language: Classical Arabic
- Headquarters: Khalwat al-Bayada
- Territory: Jabal al-Druze, Wadi al-Taym
- Founder: Hamza ibn Ali
- Origin: Between 1017 and 1018 CE; Cairo, Fatimid Caliphate
- Separated from: Shiʿa Islam (Ismā‘īlism)
- Number of followers: c. 800,000 – 2,000,000 (referred to as al-Muwaḥḥidūn al-Druze)

The Druze, (Note: /druːz/ DROOZ; Arabic: دَرْزِيّ, darzī or دُرْزِيّ durzī, pl. دُرُوز, durūz) who call themselves al-Muwaḥḥidūn (lit. 'the monotheists' or 'the unitarians'), are an esoteric religious group of Arabs who adhere to the Druze faith, an Abrahamic, esoteric, monotheistic, ethnic, and syncretic religion whose main tenets assert the unity of God, reincarnation, and the eternity of the soul.

Although the Druze faith originally developed from the Ismā‘īli branch of Shiʿa Islam, members of the Druze community do not identify as Muslims. They maintain the Arabic language and culture as integral parts of their identity, with Arabic being their primary language. Most Druze religious practices are kept secret, and conversion to their religion is not permitted for outsiders. Interfaith marriages are rare and strongly discouraged. They differentiate between spiritual individuals, known as "uqqāl", who hold the faith's secrets, and secular ones, known as "juhhāl", who focus on worldly matters. Druze believe that, after completing the cycle of rebirth through successive reincarnations, the soul reunites with the Cosmic Mind (al-ʻaql al-kullī).

The Epistles of Wisdom (Rasāʾil al-Ḥikma) is the foundational and central text of the Druze faith. The Druze faith originated in the Ismā‘īli denomination of Shiʿa Islam, and has been influenced by a diverse range of philosophical and religious traditions, including Christianity, Gnosticism, Neoplatonism, Zoroastrianism, Manichaeism, and Pythagoreanism. This has led to the development of a distinct and secretive theology, characterized by an esoteric interpretation of scripture that emphasizes the importance of the mind and truthfulness. Druze beliefs include the concepts of theophany and reincarnation.

The Druze hold Shuaib in high regard, believing him to be the same person as the biblical Jethro. They regard Adam, Noah, Abraham, Moses, Jesus, Muhammad, and the Ismā‘īli Imam Muhammad ibn Isma'il as prophets. Additionally, Druze tradition honors figures such as Salman the Persian, al-Khidr (who they say are reincarnations of Elijah, John the Baptist, and Saint George), Job, Luke the Evangelist, and others as "mentors" and "prophets".

The Druze faith is one of the major religious groups in the Levant, with between 800,000 and a million adherents. They are primarily located in Lebanon, Syria, and Israel, with smaller communities in Jordan. They make up 5.5% of Lebanon's population, 3% of Syria's and 1.6% of Israel's. The oldest and most densely populated Druze communities exist in Mount Lebanon and in the south of Syria around Jabal al-Druze (literally the "Mountain of the Druze"). The Druze community played a critically important role in shaping the history of the Levant, where it continues to play a significant political role. As a religious minority, they have often faced religious persecution from various Muslim regimes, including contemporary Islamic extremists and terrorists.

Several theories about the origins of the Druze have been proposed, with the Arabian hypothesis being the most widely accepted among historians, intellectuals, and religious leaders within the Druze community. This hypothesis significantly influences the Druze's self-perception, cultural identity, and both oral and written traditions. It suggests that the Druze are descended from 12 Arab tribes that migrated to Syria before and during the early Islamic period. This perspective is accepted by all Druze communities in Syria and Lebanon, as well as by most Druze in Israel. (Note: In 1962, Israel redefined the Druze's ethnic identity from "Arab" to "Druze" on official documents, creating a distinct political and national identity and establishing a separate education system to foster a "Druze and Israeli" consciousness. This initiative aimed to counteract "Arabization" and "Palestinianization", resulted in an independent Druze curriculum. While most Druze in Israel continue to identify as Arabs, some have adopted a distinct "Druze ethnic identity" for political or social reasons. Scholars argue that this policy, supported by a co-opted Druze political elite, privileges the Druze's communal aspects while marginalizing their broader ethnic and national identity.)

== Etymology ==
The name "Druze" probably derives from the name of Muhammad bin Ismail Nashtakin ad-Darazī (from Persian darzi, "seamster") who was an early preacher. Although the Druze consider ad-Darazī a heretic, the name has been used to identify them, possibly by their historical opponents as a way to attach their community with ad-Darazi's poor reputation.

Before becoming public, the movement was secretive and held closed meetings in what was known as Sessions of Wisdom. During this stage a dispute occurred between ad-Darazi and Hamza bin Ali mainly concerning ad-Darazi's ghuluww ("exaggeration"), which refers to the belief that God was incarnated in human beings to ad-Darazi naming himself "The Sword of the Faith", which led Hamza to write an epistle refuting the need for the sword to spread the faith and several epistles refuting the beliefs of the ghulat.

In 1016, ad-Darazi and his followers openly proclaimed their beliefs and called people to join them, causing riots in Cairo against the Unitarian movement including Hamza bin Ali and his followers. This led to the suspension of the movement for one year and the expulsion of ad-Darazi and his supporters.

Although the Druze religious books describe ad-Darazi as the "insolent one" and as the "calf" who is narrow-minded and hasty, the name "Druze" is still used for identification and for historical reasons. In 1018, ad-Darazi was assassinated for his teachings; some sources claim that he was executed by Al-Hakim bi-Amr Allah.

Some authorities see in the name "Druze" a descriptive epithet, derived from Arabic dārisah ("she who studies"). Others have speculated that the word comes from the Persian word Darazo (درز "bliss") or from Shaykh Hussayn ad-Darazī, who was one of the early converts to the faith. In the early stages of the movement, the word "Druze" is rarely mentioned by historians, and in Druze religious texts only the word Muwaḥḥidūn ("Unitarian") appears. The only early Arab historian who mentions the Druze is the eleventh century Christian scholar Yahya of Antioch, who clearly refers to the heretical group created by ad-Darazī, rather than the followers of Hamza ibn 'Alī. As for Western sources, Benjamin of Tudela, the Jewish traveler who passed through Lebanon in or around 1165, was one of the first European writers to refer to the Druze by name. The word Dogziyin ("Druzes") occurs in an early Hebrew edition of his travels, but it is clear that this is a scribal error. Be that as it may, he described the Druze as "mountain dwellers, monotheists, who believe in 'soul eternity' and reincarnation". He also stated that "they loved the Jews".

== Location ==
The number of Druze people worldwide is between 800,000 and one million, with the vast majority residing in the Levant. The primary countries with Druze populations are Syria, Lebanon, Israel, and Jordan.

According to the Institute of Druze Studies, as of 1998, approximately 40–50% of Druze live in Syria, 30–40% in Lebanon, 6–7% in Israel, and 1–2% in Jordan. About 2% of the Druze are scattered across other Middle Eastern countries, and there were approximately 20,000 Druze in the United States at that time. Scholar Colbert C. Held from the University of Nebraska–Lincoln estimates that the global Druze population is around 1 million. He notes that about 45% to 50% live in Syria, 35% to 40% live in Lebanon, and less than 10% live in Israel. Recently, there has been a growing Druze diaspora.

Outside the Middle East, significant Druze communities exist in Australia, Canada, Europe, Latin America (mainly Venezuela, Colombia and Brazil), the United States, and West Africa. They are Arabs who speak Levantine Arabic and follow a social pattern very similar to those of the other peoples of the Levant (eastern Mediterranean). In 2021 the largest Druze communities outside the Middle East are in Venezuela, with approximately 60,000, and in the United States, with around 50,000. In 2017, the Los Angeles Times reported about 30,000 Druze in the United States, with the largest concentration in Southern California.

== History ==
=== Early history ===
The story of the creation of the Druze faith in the days between 1017 and 1018 is dominated by three men and their struggle for influence.

- Hamza ibn Ali ibn Ahmad was an Ismaili mystic and scholar from Khorasan, who arrived in Fatimid Egypt in 1014 or 1016, and began to preach a Muwaḥḥidūn ("Unitarian") doctrine.
- al-Hakim bi-Amr Allah, the sixth Fātimid caliph, became a central figure in the faith being preached by Hamza ibn Ali ibn Ahmad.
- Muhammad bin Ismail Nashtakin ad-Darazi arrived in Cairo in 1015 or 1017, possibly from Bukhara, joined the movement and became an important preacher.

==== Hamza ibn Ali ibn Ahmad arrives in Cairo ====
Hamza ibn Ali ibn Ahmad, an Ismaili mystic and scholar from Zozan, Khorasan, in the Samanid Empire, arrived in Fatimid Egypt in 1014 or 1016. He assembled a group of scholars that met regularly in the Raydan Mosque, near the Al-Hakim Mosque. In 1017, Hamza began to preach a Muwaḥḥidūn (Unitarian) doctrine.

Hamza gained the support of the Fātimid caliph al-Hakim bi-Amr Allah, who issued a decree promoting religious freedom and eventually became a central figure in the Druze faith. (Note: The Fātimid caliph al-Hakim bi-Amr Allah became a central figure in the Druze faith, although his religious position was disputed among scholars. John Esposito states that al-Hakim believed that "he was not only the divinely appointed religio-political leader, but also the cosmic intellect linking God with creation", while others like Nissîm Dānā and Mordechai Nisan state that he is perceived as the manifestation and the reincarnation of God or presumably the image of God.)

==== al-Darazi arrives in Cairo ====
Little is known about the early life of al-Darazi. According to most sources, he was born in Bukhara. He is believed to have been of Persian origins and his title al-Darazi is Persian in origin, meaning "the tailor". He arrived in Cairo in 1015, or 1017, after which he joined the newly emerged Druze movement.

Al-Darazi was converted early to the Unitarian faith and became one of its early preachers. At that time, the movement enlisted a large number of adherents. As the number of his followers grew, he became obsessed with his leadership and gave himself the title "The Sword of the Faith". Al-Darazi argued that he should be the leader of the daʻwah rather than Hamza ibn Ali and gave himself the title "Lord of the Guides" because Caliph al-Hakim referred to Hamza as "Guide of the Consented". It is said that al-Darazi allowed wine, forbidden marriages and taught metempsychosis although this may be exaggeration by contemporary and later historians and polemicists.

This attitude led to disputes between al-Darazi and Hamza ibn Ali, who disliked his behavior and his arrogance. In the Epistles of Wisdom, Hamza ibn Ali ibn Ahmad warns al-Darazi, saying, "Faith does not need a sword to aid it", but al-Darazi ignored Hamza's warnings and continued to challenge the Imam.

==== al-Darazi issues the unitarian call ====
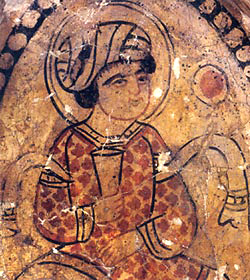
Sixth Fatimid caliph, al-Hakim bi-Amr Allah

The divine call or unitarian call is the Druze period of time that was opened at sunset on Thursday, 30 May 1017 by Ad-Darazi. The call summoned people to a true unitarian belief that removed all attributes (wise, just, outside, inside, etc.) from God. It promoted absolute monotheism and the concepts of supporting your fellow man, true speech and pursuit of oneness with God. These concepts superseded all ritual, law and dogma and requirements for pilgrimage, fasting, holy days, prayer, charity, devotion, creed and particular worship of any prophet or person was downplayed. Sharia was opposed and Druze traditions started during the call continue today, such as meeting for reading, prayer and social gathering on a Thursday instead of a Friday at Khalwats instead of mosques. Such gatherings and traditions were not compulsory and people were encouraged to pursue a state of compliance with the real law of nature governing the universe. Epistle thirteen of the Epistles of Wisdom called it "A spiritual doctrine without any ritualistic imposition".

The time of the call was seen as a revolution of truth, with missionaries preaching its message all around the Middle East. These messengers were sent out with the Druze epistles and took written vows from believers, whose souls are thought to still exist in the Druze of today. The souls of those who took the vows during the call are believed to be continuously reincarnating in successive generations of Druze until the return of al-Hakim to proclaim a second Divine call and establish a Golden Age of justice and peace for all.

==== al-Darazi is executed ====
By 1018, al-Darazi had gathered around him partisans—"Darazites"—who believed that universal reason became incarnated in Adam at the beginning of the world, was then passed to the prophets, then into Ali, and then into his descendants, the Fatimid Caliphs. Al-Darazi wrote a book laying out this doctrine, but when he read from his book in the principal mosque in Cairo, it caused riots and protests against his claims and many of his followers were killed.

Hamza ibn Ali rejected al-Darazi's ideology, calling him "the insolent one and Satan". The controversy led Caliph al-Hakim to suspend the Druze daʻwah in 1018.

In an attempt to gain the support of al-Hakim, al-Darazi started preaching that al-Hakim and his ancestors were the incarnation of God. An inherently modest man, al-Hakim did not believe that he was God, and felt al-Darazi was trying to depict himself as a new prophet. In 1018 Al-Hakim had al-Darazi executed, leaving Hamza the sole leader of the new faith and al-Darazi considered to be a renegade.

==== Disappearance of Al-Hakim ====
Al-Hakim disappeared one night while on his evening ride—presumably assassinated, perhaps at the behest of his formidable elder sister Sitt al-Mulk. The Druze believe he went into Occultation with Hamza ibn Ali and three other prominent preachers, leaving the care of the "Unitarian missionary movement" to a new leader, al-Muqtana Baha'uddin.

The call was suspended briefly between 19 May 1018 and 9 May 1019 during the apostasy of al-Darazi and again between 1021 and 1026 during a period of persecution by the Fatimid caliph al-Zahir li-I'zaz Din Allah for those who had sworn the oath to accept the call.

Persecutions started forty days after the disappearance into Occultation of al-Hakim, who was thought to have been converting people to the Unitarian faith for over twenty years prior. Al-Hakim convinced some heretical followers such as al-Darazi of his soteriological divinity and officially declared the Divine call after issuing a decree promoting religious freedom.

Al-Hakim was replaced by his underage son, al-Zahir li-I'zaz Din Allah. The Unitarian/Druze movement acknowledged al-Zahir as the caliph but continued to regard Hamzah as its Imam. The young caliph's regent, Sitt al-Mulk, ordered the army to destroy the movement in 1021. At the same time, Bahāʼ al-Dīn was assigned the leadership of the Unitarians by Hamza.

For the next seven years, the Druze faced extreme persecution by al-Zahir li-I'zaz Din Allah, who wanted to eradicate the faith. This was the result of a power struggle inside of the Fatimid Calphate, in which the Druze were viewed with suspicion because they refused to recognize the new caliph as their Imam.

Many spies, mainly the followers of al-Darazi, joined the Unitarian movement to infiltrate the Druze community. The spies set about agitating trouble and soiling the reputation of the Druze. This resulted in friction with the new caliph who clashed militarily with the Druze community. The clashes ranged from Antioch to Alexandria, where tens of thousands of Druze were slaughtered by the Fatimid army, "this mass persecution known by the Druze as the period of the mihna". The largest massacre was at Antioch, where 5000 prominent Druze were killed, followed by that of Aleppo. As a result, the faith went underground, in hope of survival, as those captured were either forced to renounce their faith or be killed. Druze survivors "were found principally in southern Lebanon and Syria".

In 1038, two years after the death of al-Zahir li-I'zaz Din Allah, the Druze movement was able to resume because the new leadership that replaced him had friendly political ties with at least one prominent Druze leader.

==== Closing of the unitarian call ====
In 1043, Baha al-Din al-Muqtana declared that the sect would no longer accept new pledges, and since that time proselytism has been prohibited awaiting al-Hakim's return at the Last Judgment to usher in a new Golden Age.

Some Druze and non-Druze scholars like Samy Swayd and Sami Makarem state that this confusion is due to confusion about the role of the early preacher al-Darazi, whose teachings the Druze rejected as heretical. These sources assert that al-Hakim rejected al-Darazi's claims of divinity, and ordered the elimination of his movement while supporting that of Hamza ibn Ali.

=== During the Crusades ===
Wadi al-Taym, in Lebanon, was one of the two most important centers of Druze missionary activity in the 11th century and was the first area where the Druze appeared in the historical record under the name "Druze". It is generally considered the birthplace of the Druze faith.

It was during the period of Crusader rule in Levant (1099–1291) that the Druze first emerged into the full light of history in the Gharb region of the Chouf. As powerful warriors serving the leaders in Damascus against the Crusades, the Druze were given the task of keeping watch over the Crusaders in the seaport of Beirut, to prevent them from making any encroachments inland. Subsequently, the Druze chiefs of the Gharb placed their considerable military experience at the disposal of the Mamluk sultans in Egypt (1250–1516); first, to assist them in putting an end to what remained of Crusader rule in the coastal Levant, and later to help them safeguard the Lebanese coast against Crusader retaliation by sea.

In the early period of the Crusader era, the Druze feudal power was in the hands of two families, the Tanukhs and the Arslans. From their fortresses in the Gharb area (now in Aley District of southern Mount Lebanon Governorate), the Tanukhs led their incursions into the Phoenician coast and finally succeeded in holding Beirut and the marine plain against the Franks. Because of their fierce battles with the Crusaders, the Druze earned the respect of the Sunni caliphs and thus gained important political powers.

After the middle of the twelfth century, the Maan family superseded the Tanukhs in Druze leadership. The origin of the family goes back to Prince Ma'an, who made his appearance in Lebanon in the days of the Abbasid caliph al-Mustarshid (1118–35). The Ma'ans chose for their abode the Chouf in south-western Lebanon (southern Mount Lebanon Governorate), overlooking the maritime plain between Beirut and Sidon, and made their headquarters in Baaqlin, which is still a leading Druze village. They were invested with feudal authority by Sultan Nur ad-Din Zengi and furnished respectable contingents to the Muslim ranks in their struggle against the Crusaders.

Certain aspects of the faith, such as transmigration of souls between adherents and incarnation, were viewed as heretical or kufr (infidelity) and foreign by Sunni and Shia Muslims, but contributed to solidarity among the Druze, who closed their religion to new converts in 1046 due to the threat of persecution. The proto-Salafi thinker ibn Taymiyya believed the Druze had a high level of infidelity besides being apostates. Thus, they were not trustworthy and should not be forgiven. He taught also that Muslims cannot accept Druze penitence nor keep them alive, and that Druze property should be confiscated and their women enslaved.

Having cleared the Holy Land of the Crusaders, the Mamluk Sultanate now turned their attention to the schismatic Muslims of Syria. In 1305, after the issuing of a fatwa by the scholar ibn Taymiyya calling for jihad against all non-Sunni Muslim groups like the Druze, Alawites, Isma'ilis, and Twelver Shi'a, al-Nasir Muhammad inflicted a disastrous defeat on the Druze at Keserwan, and forced outward compliance on their part to Sunnism. The Sunni Mamluk campaigns led to the destruction of many Christian churches and monasteries and Druze sanctuaries khilwat, and caused mass destruction of Maronite and Druze villages and the killings and mass displacement of its inhabitants. Lebanese Sunni authors generally write of the campaigns from a pro-Mamluk stance, seeing in them the legitimate Muslim state's efforts to incorporate Mount Lebanon into the Islamic realm, while Druze authors write with a focus on the Druze community's consistent connection to Mount Lebanon and defense of its practical autonomy.

Later, the Druze were severely attacked at Saoufar in the 1585 Ottoman expedition against the Druze after the Ottomans claimed that the Druze had assaulted their caravans near Tripoli. As a result of the Ottoman experience with the rebellious Druze, the word Durzi in Turkish came to mean ‘someone who is the ultimate thug'.

The 16th and 17th centuries witnessed a succession of armed Druze rebellions against the Ottomans countered by repeated Ottoman punitive expeditions against the Chouf, in which the Druze population of the area was severely depleted and many villages destroyed. These military measures, severe as they were, did not succeed in reducing the local Druze to the required degree of subordination. This led the Ottoman government to agree to an arrangement whereby the different nahiyahs (districts) of the Chouf would be granted in iltizam ("fiscal concession") to one of the region's amirs, or leading chiefs, leaving the maintenance of law and order and the collection of taxes in the area in the hands of the appointed amir. This arrangement was to provide the cornerstone for the privileged status ultimately enjoyed by the whole of Mount Lebanon, Druze and Christian areas alike.

=== Ma'an dynasty ===
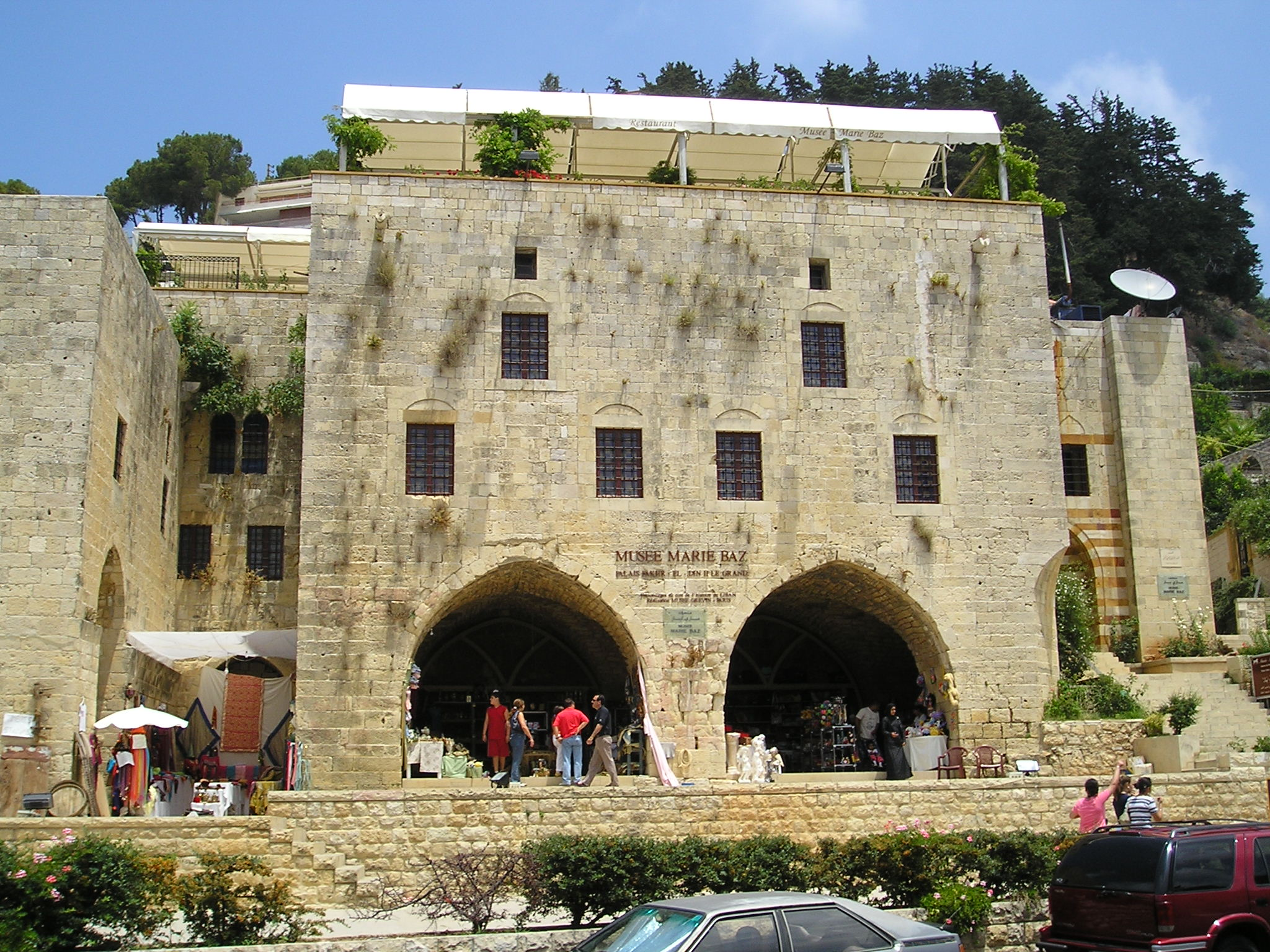
The saray in Deir al-Qamar, seat of the Ma'an dynasty under Fakhr al-Din

With the advent of the Ottoman Turks and the conquest of Syria by Sultan Selim I in 1516, the Ma'ans were acknowledged by the new rulers as the feudal lords of southern Lebanon. Druze villages spread and prospered in that region, which under Ma'an leadership so flourished that it acquired the generic term of Jabal Bayt-Ma'an (the mountain home of the Ma'an) or Jabal al-Druze. The latter title has since been usurped by the Hawran region, which since the middle of the 19th century has proven a haven of refuge to Druze emigrants from Lebanon and has become the headquarters of Druze power.

Under Fakhr-al-Dīn II (Fakhreddin II), the Druze dominion increased until it included Lebanon-Phoenicia and almost all Syria, extending from the edge of the Antioch plain in the north to Safad in the south, with a part of the Syrian desert dominated by Fakhr-al-Din's castle at Tadmur (Palmyra), the ancient capital of Zenobia. The ruins of this castle still stand on a steep hill overlooking the town. Fakhr-al-Din became too strong for his Turkish sovereign in Constantinople. He went so far in 1608 as to sign a commercial treaty with Duke Ferdinand I of Tuscany containing secret military clauses. The Sultan then sent a force against him, and he was compelled to flee the land and seek refuge in the courts of Tuscany and Naples in 1613 and 1615 respectively.

In 1618, political changes in the Ottoman sultanate had resulted in the removal of many enemies of Fakhr-al-Din from power, signaling the prince's triumphant return to Lebanon soon afterwards. Through a clever policy of bribery and warfare, he extended his domains to cover all of modern Lebanon, some of Syria and northern Galilee.

In 1632, Küçük Ahmed Pasha was named Lord of Damascus. Küçük Ahmed Pasha was a rival of Fakhr-al-Din and a friend of the sultan Murad IV, who ordered the pasha and the sultanate's navy to attack Lebanon and depose Fakhr-al-Din.

This time the prince decided to remain in Lebanon and resist the offensive, but the death of his son Ali in Wadi al-Taym was the beginning of his defeat. He later took refuge in Jezzine's grotto, closely followed by Küçük Ahmed Pasha who eventually caught up with him and his family.

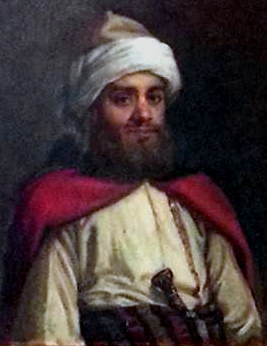
A modern, artistic representation of Fakhr-al-Dīn II in the Beiteddine Palace. Fakhr al-Din is considered by the Lebanese as the founder of the country.

Fakhr-al-Din was captured, taken to Istanbul, and imprisoned with two of his sons in the infamous Yedi Kule prison. The Sultan had Fakhr-al-Din and his sons killed on 13 April 1635 in Istanbul, bringing an end to an era in the history of Lebanon, which would not regain its current boundaries until it was proclaimed a mandate state and republic in 1920. One version recounts that the younger son was spared, raised in the harem and went on to become Ottoman Ambassador to India.

Fakhr-al-Din II was the first ruler in modern Lebanon to open the doors of his country to foreign Western influences. Under his auspices the French established a khān (hostel) in Sidon, the Florentines a consulate, and Christian missionaries were admitted into the country. Beirut and Sidon, which Fakhr-al-Din II beautified, still bear traces of his benign rule. See the new biography of this Prince, based on original sources, by TJ Gorton: Renaissance Emir: a Druze Warlord at the Court of the Medici (London, Quartet Books, 2013), for an updated view of his life.

Fakhr ad Din II was succeeded in 1635 by his nephew Mulhim Ma'n, who ruled through his death in 1658. (Fakhr ad Din's only surviving son, Husayn, lived the rest of his life as a court official in Constantinople.) Emir Mulhim exercised Iltizam taxation rights in the Shuf, Gharb, Jurd, Matn, and Kisrawan districts of Lebanon. Mulhim's forces battled and defeated those of Mustafa Pasha, Beylerbey of Damascus, in 1642, but he is reported by historians to have been otherwise loyal to Ottoman rule.

Following Mulhim's death, his sons Ahmad and Korkmaz entered into a power struggle with other Ottoman-backed Druze leaders. In 1660, the Ottoman Empire moved to reorganize the region, placing the sanjaks (districts) of Sidon-Beirut and Safed in a newly formed province of Sidon, a move seen by local Druze as an attempt to assert control. Contemporary historian Istifan al-Duwayhi reports that Korkmaz was killed in act of treachery by the Beylerbey of Damascus in 1662. Ahmad however emerged victorious in the power struggle among the Druze in 1667, but the Maʿnīs lost control of Safad and retreated to controlling the iltizam of the Shuf mountains and Kisrawan. Ahmad continued as local ruler through his death from natural causes, without heir, in 1697.

During the Ottoman–Habsburg War (1683–1699), Ahmad Ma'n collaborated in a rebellion against the Ottomans which extended beyond his death. Iltizam rights in Shuf and Kisrawan passed to the rising Shihab family through female-line inheritance.

=== Shihab Dynasty ===
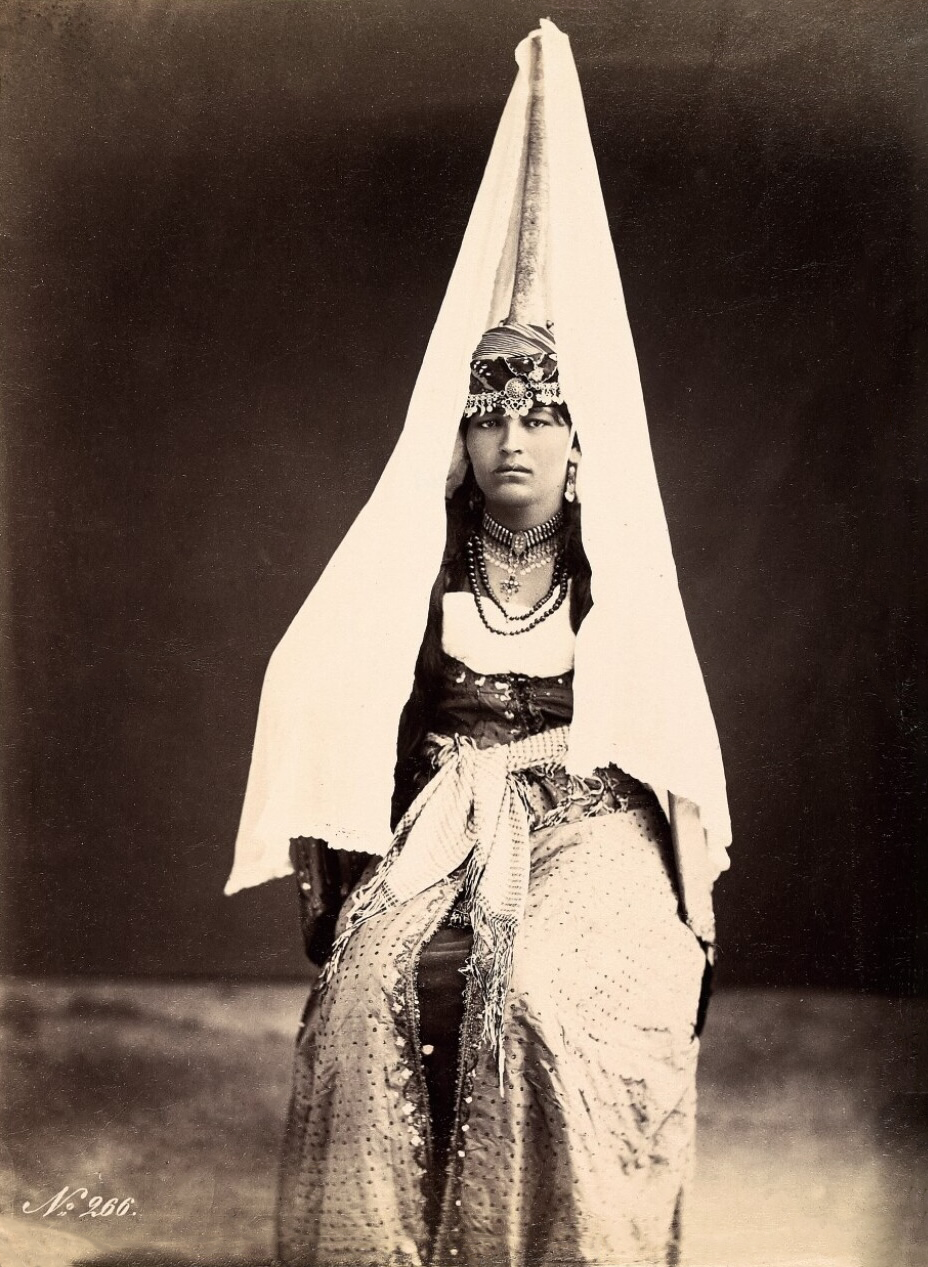
Druze woman wearing a tantour during the 1870s in Chouf, Ottoman Lebanon

As early as the days of Saladin, and while the Ma'ans were still in complete control over southern Lebanon, the Shihab tribe, originally Hijaz Arabs, but later settled in Ḥawran, advanced from Ḥawran, in 1172, and settled in Wadi al-Taym at the foot of mount Hermon. They soon made an alliance with the Ma'ans and were acknowledged as the Druze chiefs in Wadi al-Taym. At the end of the 17th century (1697) the Shihabs succeeded the Ma'ans in the feudal leadership of Druze southern Lebanon, although they reportedly professed Sunni Islam, they showed sympathy with Druze, the religion of the majority of their subjects.

The Shihab leadership continued until the middle of the 19th century and culminated in the illustrious governorship of Amir Bashir Shihab II (1788–1840) who, after Fakhr-al-Din, was the most powerful feudal lord Lebanon produced. Though governor of the Druze Mountain, Bashir was a crypto-Christian, and it was he whose aid Napoleon solicited in 1799 during his campaign against Syria. The "Druze-Christian alliance" during this century was the major factor enabling the Shehab dynasty to maintain power.

Having consolidated his conquests in Syria (1831–1838), Ibrahim Pasha, son of the viceroy of Egypt, Muhammad Ali Pasha, made the fatal mistake of trying to disarm the Christians and Druze of the Lebanon and to draft the latter into his army. This was contrary to the principles of the life of independence which these mountaineers had always lived, and resulted in a general uprising against Egyptian rule. The Druze of Wadi al-Taym and Ḥawran, under the leadership of Shibli al-Aryan, distinguished themselves in their stubborn resistance at their inaccessible headquarters, al-Laja, lying southeast of Damascus.

=== Qaysites and the Yemenites ===
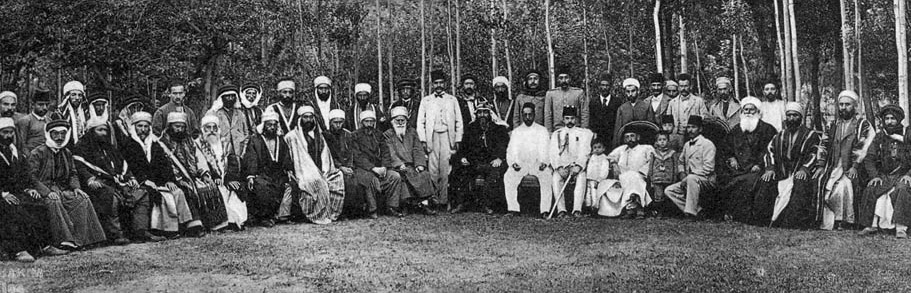
Meeting of Druze and Ottoman leaders in Damascus, about the control of Jebel Druze

The conquest of Syria by the Muslim Arabs in the middle of the seventh century introduced into the land two political factions later called the Qaysites and the Yemenites. The Qaysite party represented the Bedouin Arabs who were regarded as inferior by the Yemenites who were earlier and more cultured emigrants into Syria from southern Arabia. Druze and Christians grouped in political, rather than religious, parties; the party lines in Lebanon obliterated ethnic and religious lines and the people grouped themselves into one or the other of these two parties regardless of their religious affiliations. The sanguinary feuds between these two factions depleted, in course of time, the manhood of the Lebanon and ended in the decisive battle of Ain Dara in 1711, which resulted in the utter defeat of the Yemenite party. Many Yemenite Druze thereupon migrated to the Hauran region, laying the foundation of Druze power there.

The Qays were led by Emir Haydar of the Shihab dynasty and consisted of the Druze clans of Jumblatt, Talhuq, Imad and Abd al-Malik and the Maronite clan of Khazen. The Yamani faction was led by Mahmoud Abu Harmoush and consisted of the Druze Alam al-Din, Arslan and Sawaf clans. The Yamani faction also had backing from the Ottoman provincial authorities of Sidon and Damascus. The battle ended in a rout of the Yamani faction and resulted in the consolidation of Qaysi political and fiscal domination over Mount Lebanon. The battle's outcome also precipitated a mass migration of pro-Yamani Druze nobility and peasants from Mount Lebanon to the eastern Hauran, in a mountainous area today known as Jabal al-Druze. This area had seen previous waves of Druze migration starting in 1685. Consequently, the Maronite Christian population in Mount Lebanon became the dominant group. The Yamani Druze exodus significantly contributed to a demographic shift in Mount Lebanon, with Maronites and other Christians, namely from the Greek Orthodox and Melkite sects, making up a large share of the population at the expense of the Druze.

=== Civil conflict of 1860 ===
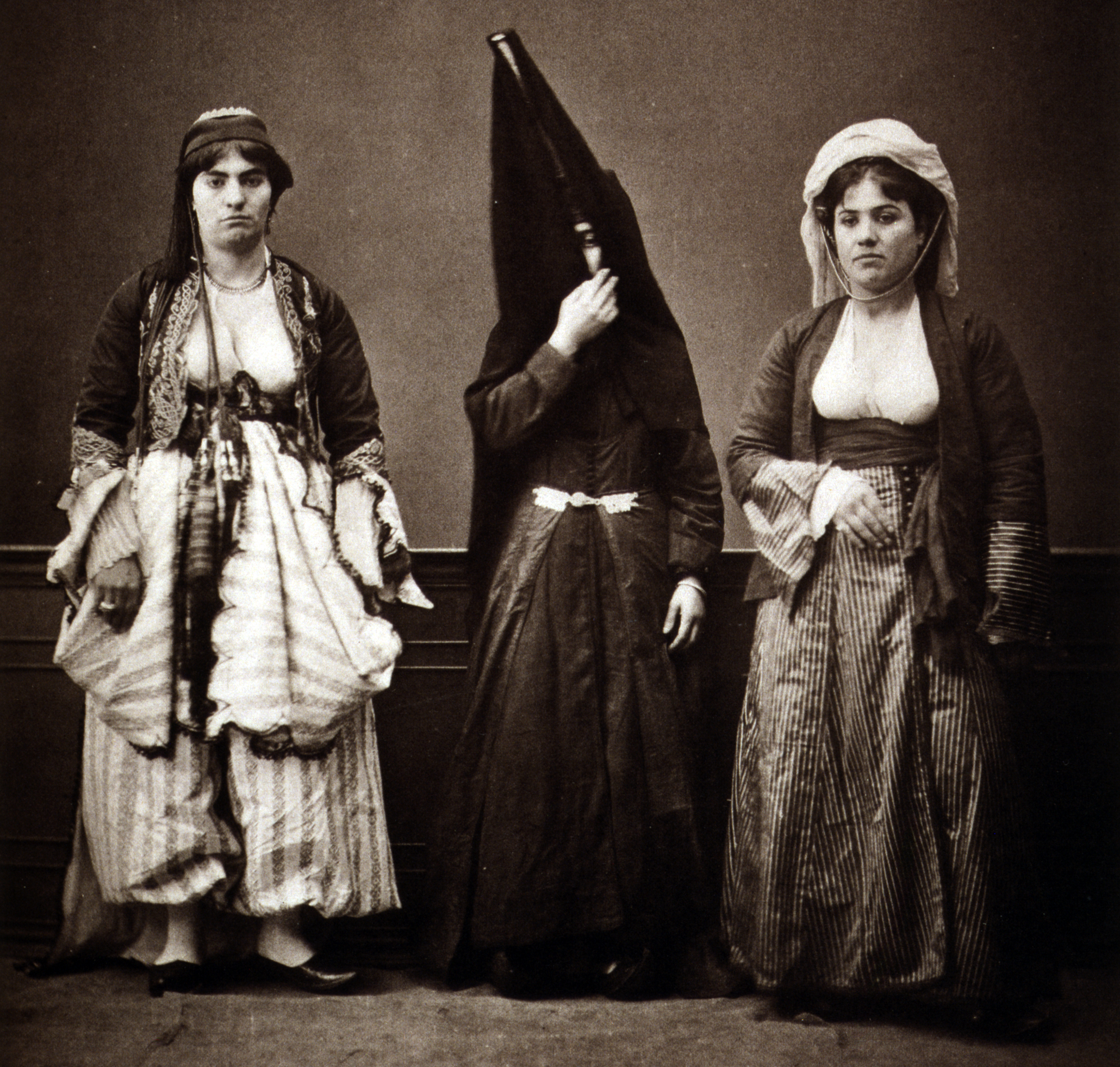
Left to right: Christian woman from Zahlé, Lebanese Druze woman, and a Christian woman from Zgharta (1873)

The relationship between the Druze and Christians has been characterized by harmony and coexistence, with amicable relations between the two groups prevailing throughout history, with the exception of some periods, including 1860 civil conflict in Mount Lebanon and Damascus. In 1840, social disturbances started between Druze and their Christian Maronite neighbors, who had previously been on friendly terms. This culminated in the civil war of 1860.

After the Shehab dynasty converted to Christianity, some prominent Druze families, including the Druze Abi-Lamma clan—who were close allies of the Shihabs—also converted to Christianity and joined the Maronite Church. The Druze community and feudal leaders came under attack from the regime with the collaboration of the Maronite Catholic Church, and the Druze lost most of their political and feudal powers. Also, the Druze formed an alliance with Britain and allowed Protestant missionaries to enter Mount Lebanon, creating tension between them and the Catholic Maronites.

The Maronite-Druze conflict in 1840–60 was an outgrowth of the Maronite independence movement, directed against the Druze, Druze feudalism, and the Ottoman-Turks. The civil war was not therefore a religious war, except in Damascus, where it spread and where the vastly non-Druze population was anti-Christian. This animosity was fueled by economic disparities, with Christians, who were generally wealthier and more prosperous, compare to the economically struggling Muslim residents. The movement culminated with the 1859–60 massacre and defeat of the Maronites by the Druze. The civil war of 1860 cost the Maronites some ten thousand lives in Damascus, Zahlé, Deir al-Qamar, Hasbaya, and other towns of Lebanon.

The European powers then determined to intervene, and authorized the landing in Beirut of a body of French troops under General Beaufort d'Hautpoul, whose inscription can still be seen on the historic rock at the mouth of Nahr al-Kalb. French intervention on behalf of the Maronites did not help the Maronite national movement, since France was restricted in 1860 by the British government, which did not want the Ottoman Empire dismembered. But European intervention pressured the Turks to treat the Maronites more justly. Following the recommendations of the powers, the Ottoman Porte granted Lebanon local autonomy, guaranteed by the powers, under a Maronite governor. This autonomy was maintained until World War I.

The Maronite Catholics and the Druze founded modern Lebanon in the early eighteenth century, through the ruling and social system known as the "Maronite-Druze dualism" which developed in Ottoman-era Mount Lebanon Mutasarrifate, creating one of the calmest atmospheres that Lebanon had ever lived in. The ruling and social system in the Mount Lebanon Mutasarrifate was formed from the Maronite-Druze dualism, and the security stability and Druze-Maronite coexistence in the Mutasarrifate allowed the development of the economy and the system of government.

=== Rebellion in Hauran ===
The Hauran rebellion was a violent Druze uprising against Ottoman authority in the Syrian province, which erupted in May 1909. The rebellion was led by the al-Atrash family, originated in local disputes and Druze unwillingness to pay taxes and conscript into the Ottoman Army. The rebellion ended in brutal suppression of the Druze by General Sami Pasha al-Farouqi, significant depopulation of the Hauran region and execution of the Druze leaders in 1910. In the outcome of the revolt, 2,000 Druze were killed, a similar number wounded, and hundreds of Druze fighters imprisoned. Al-Farouqi also disarmed the population, extracted significant taxes, and launched a census of the region.

== Modern history ==
In Lebanon, Syria, Israel, and Jordan, the Druze have official recognition as a separate religious community with its own religious court system.

Although most Druze no longer consider themselves as Muslims, Al Azhar of Egypt recognized them in 1959 as an Islamic sect in the Al-Azhar Shia Fatwa due to political reasons; Gamal Abdel Nasser, who was the president of Egypt at the time, saw it as a tool to spread his appeal and influence across the entire Arab world.

The Druze religion does not endorse separatism, and urges blending with the communities they reside in; the Druze have often done so to avoid persecution. Yet the Druze also have a history of resistance to occupying powers, and they have at times enjoyed more freedom than most other groups living in the Levant.

=== In Syria ===
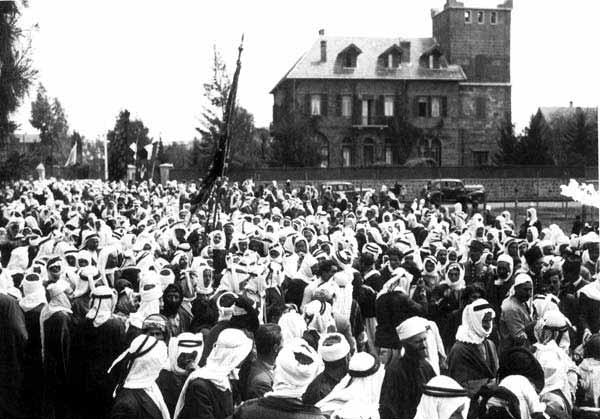
Druze warriors preparing to go to battle with Sultan Pasha al-Atrash in 1925

In Syria, most Druze live in the Jebel al-Druze, a rugged and mountainous region in the southwest of the country, which is more than 90 percent Druze inhabited; some 120 villages are exclusively so. Other notable communities live in the Harim Mountains, the Damascus suburb of Jaramana, and on the southeast slopes of Mount Hermon. A large Syrian Druze community historically lived in the Golan Heights, but following wars with Israel in 1967 and 1973, many of these Druze fled to other parts of Syria; most of those who remained live in a handful of villages in the disputed zone, while only a few live in the narrow remnant of Quneitra Governorate that is still under effective Syrian control.

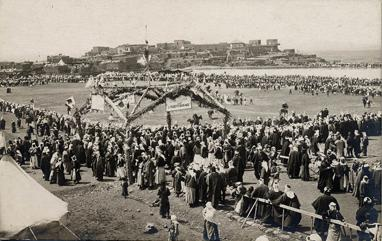
Druze celebrating their independence in 1925

The Druze always played a far more important role in Syrian politics than its comparatively small population would suggest. With a community of little more than 100,000 in 1949, or roughly three percent of the Syrian population, the Druze of Syria's southwestern mountains constituted a potent force in Syrian politics and played a leading role in the nationalist struggle against the French. Under the military leadership of Sultan Pasha al-Atrash, the Druze provided much of the military force behind the Syrian Revolution of 1925–27. In 1945, Amir Hasan al-Atrash, the paramount political leader of the Jebel al-Druze, led the Druze military units in a successful revolt against the French, making the Jebel al-Druze the first and only region in Syria to liberate itself from French rule without British assistance. At independence the Druze, made confident by their successes, expected that Damascus would reward them for their many sacrifices on the battlefield. They demanded to keep their autonomous administration and many political privileges accorded them by the French and sought generous economic assistance from the newly independent government.

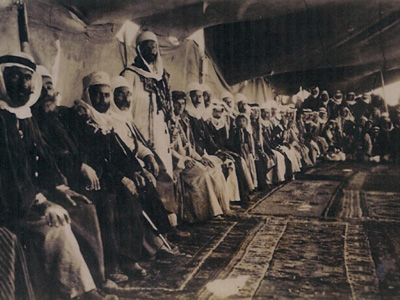
Druze leaders meeting in Jebel al-Druze, Syria, 1926

When a local paper in 1945 reported that President Shukri al-Quwatli (1943–49) had called the Druze a "dangerous minority", Sultan Pasha al-Atrash flew into a rage and demanded a public retraction. If it were not forthcoming, he announced, the Druze would indeed become "dangerous", and a force of 4,000 Druze warriors would "occupy the city of Damascus". Quwwatli could not dismiss Sultan Pasha's threat. The military balance of power in Syria was tilted in favor of the Druze, at least until the military build up during the 1948 War in Palestine. One advisor to the Syrian Defense Department warned in 1946 that the Syrian army was "useless", and that the Druze could "take Damascus and capture the present leaders in a breeze".

During the four years of Adib Shishakli's rule in Syria (December 1949 to February 1954) (on 25 August 1952: Adib al-Shishakli created the Arab Liberation Movement (ALM), a progressive party with pan-Arabist and socialist views), the Druze community was subjected to heavy attack by the Syrian government. Shishakli believed that among his many opponents in Syria, the Druze were the most potentially dangerous, and he was determined to crush them. He frequently proclaimed: "My enemies are like a serpent: The head is the Jebel al-Druze, the stomach Homs, and the tail Aleppo. If I crush the head, the serpent will die." Shishakli dispatched 10,000 regular troops to occupy the Jebel al-Druze. Several towns were bombarded with heavy weapons, killing scores of civilians and destroying many houses. According to Druze accounts, Shishakli encouraged neighboring Bedouin tribes to plunder the defenseless population and allowed his own troops to run amok.

Shishakli launched a brutal campaign to defame the Druze for their religion and politics. He accused the entire community of treason, at times claiming they were in the employ of the British and Hashimites, at others that they were fighting for Israel against the Arabs. He even produced a cache of Israeli weapons allegedly discovered in the Jabal. Even more painful for the Druze community was his publication of "falsified Druze religious texts" and false testimonials ascribed to leading Druze sheikhs designed to stir up sectarian hatred. This propaganda also was broadcast in the Arab world, mainly Egypt. Shishakli was assassinated in Brazil on 27 September 1964 by a Druze seeking revenge for Shishakli's bombardment of the Jebel al-Druze.

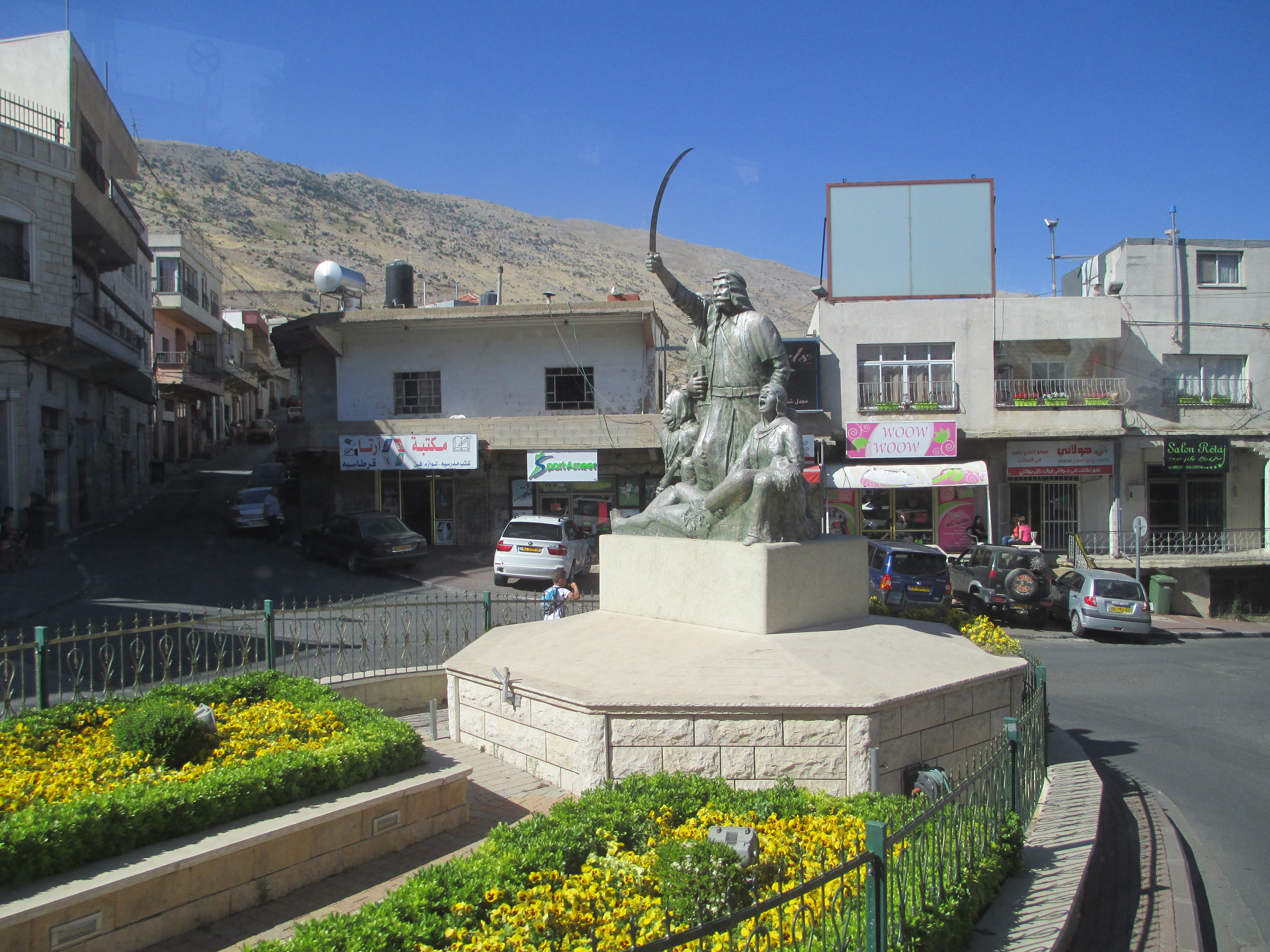
Sculpture of Sultan al-Atrash in Majdal Shams

He forcibly integrated minorities into the national Syrian social structure, his "Syrianization" of Alawite and Druze territories had to be accomplished in part using violence. To this end, al-Shishakli encouraged the stigmatization of minorities. He saw minority demands as tantamount to treason. His increasingly chauvinistic notions of Arab nationalism were predicated on the denial that "minorities" existed in Syria.

After the Shishakli's military campaign, the Druze community lost much of its political influence, but many Druze military officers had played important roles within the Ba'ath-led Syrian government.

In 1967, a community of Druze in the Golan Heights came under Israeli control, today numbering 23,000 (in 2019).

Before the Syrian civil war, it was estimated that around 700,000 Druze lived in Syria in 2010, constituting about 3% of the population. Of these, approximately 337,500 resided in the Suwayda Governorate, which had a Druze majority of around 90% and a significant Christian minority. This region accounted for 48.2% of the total Druze population in Syria. Additionally, about 250,000 Druze, or 35.7% of the total Druze population, lived in Damascus and its surrounding areas, including Jaramana, Sahnaya, and Jdeidat Artouz. Approximately 30,000 Druze lived on the eastern side of Mount Hermon, while around 25,000 Druze were spread across 14 villages in Jabal al-Summaq in Idlib Governorate.

The Qalb Loze massacre was a reported massacre of Syrian Druze on 10 June 2015 in the village of Qalb Loze in Syria's northwestern Idlib Governorate in which at least 20 Druze were killed. On 25 July 2018, a group of ISIS-affiliated attackers entered the Druze city of Suwayda and initiated a series of gunfights and suicide bombings on its streets, killing at least 258 people, the vast majority of them civilians.

Several Druze militias fought in the Syrian civil war. These included Jaysh al-Muwahhidin, which largely engaged in defensive war though were described as supporters of Bashar al-Assad and the Ba'athist-led government, alongside the Al-Jabal Brigade, who played a major role in the 2024 Syrian opposition offensives which resulted in the fall of the Assad regime.

=== In Lebanon ===
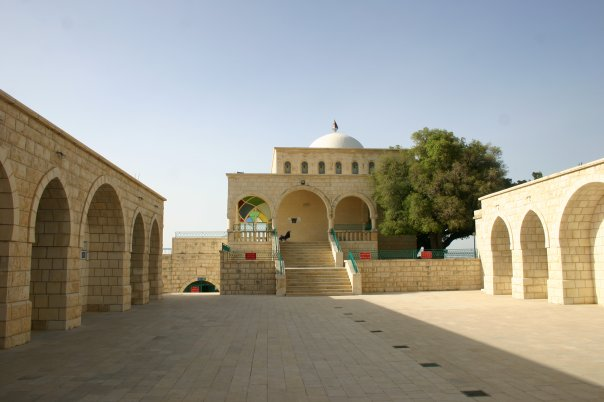
Prophet Job shrine in Niha village in the Chouf region of Lebanon.

A market in Hasbaya, a Lebanese Druze town in 1967

The Druze community in Lebanon played an important role in the formation of the modern state of Lebanon, and even though they are a minority they play an important role in the Lebanese political scene. Before and during the Lebanese Civil War (1975–90), the Druze were in favor of Pan-Arabism and Palestinian resistance represented by the PLO. Most of the community supported the Progressive Socialist Party formed by their leader Kamal Jumblatt and they fought alongside other leftist and Palestinian parties against the Lebanese Front that was mainly constituted of Christians. At the time, the Lebanese government and economy were running under the significant influence of elites within the Maronite Christian community. After the assassination of Kamal Jumblatt on 16 March 1977, his son Walid Jumblatt took the leadership of the party and played an important role in preserving his father's legacy after winning the Mountain War and sustained the existence of the Druze community during the sectarian bloodshed that lasted until 1990.

In August 2001, Maronite Catholic Patriarch Nasrallah Boutros Sfeir toured the predominantly Druze Chouf region of Mount Lebanon and visited Mukhtara, the ancestral stronghold of Druze leader Walid Jumblatt. The tumultuous reception that Sfeir received not only signified a historic reconciliation between Maronites and Druze, who had fought a bloody war in 1983–1984, but underscored the fact that the banner of Lebanese sovereignty had broad multi-confessional appeal and was a cornerstone for the Cedar Revolution in 2005. Jumblatt's post-2005 position diverged sharply from the tradition of his family. He also accused Damascus of being behind the 1977 assassination of his father, Kamal Jumblatt, expressing for the first time what many knew he privately suspected. The BBC describes Jumblatt as "the leader of Lebanon's most powerful Druze clan and heir to a leftist political dynasty". The second largest political party supported by Druze is the Lebanese Democratic Party led by Prince Talal Arslan, the son of Lebanese independence hero Emir Majid Arslan.

The Druze community is primarily located in the rural and mountainous regions to the east and south of Beirut. They represent approximately 5.2 percent of Lebanon's population and are spread across 136 villages in areas such as Hasbaya, Rashaya, Chouf, Aley, Marjeyoun and Beirut. The Druze make up the majority in Aley, Baakleen, Hasbaya and Rashaya. Specifically, they constitute over half of the population in the Aley District, about a third in the Rashaya District, and around a quarter in both the Chouf and Matn Districts.

=== In Israel ===
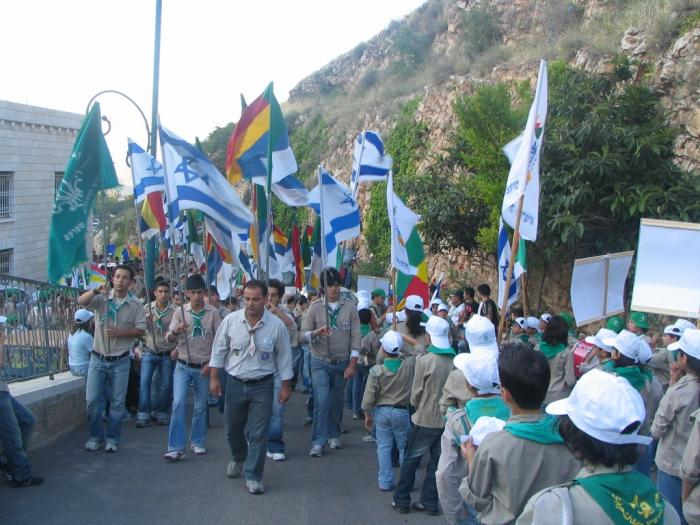
Israeli Druze Scouts march to Jethro's tomb. Today, thousands of Israeli Druze belong to such "Druze Zionist" movements.

The Druze form a religious minority in Israel of more than 100,000, mostly residing in the north of the country. In 2004, there were 102,000 Druze living in the country. In 2010, the population of Israeli Druze citizens grew to over 125,000. At the end of 2018, there were 143,000 in Israel and the Israeli-occupied portion of the Golan Heights. Most Israeli Druze identify ethnically as Arabs. Today, thousands of Israeli Druze belong to "Druze Zionist" movements.

According to the Israeli Central Bureau of Statistics census in 2020, the Druze make up about 7.6% of the Arab citizens of Israel. By the end of 2019, around 81% of the Israeli Druze population resided in the Northern District, while 19% were in the Haifa District. The largest Druze communities are found in Daliyat al-Karmel and Yirka (also known as Yarka). The Druze live in 19 towns and villages scattered across the mountaintops in northern Israel, either in exclusively Druze areas or in mixed communities with Christians and Muslims.

The Galilean Druze and Druze of the Haifa region received Israeli citizenship automatically in 1948. After Israel captured the Golan Heights from Syria in 1967 and annexed it to Israel in 1981, the Druze of the Golan Heights were offered full Israeli citizenship under the Golan Heights Law. Most declined Israeli citizenship and retain Syrian citizenship and identity and are treated as permanent residents of Israel. As of 2011, fewer than 10% of the Druze population in the Golan Heights had accepted Israeli citizenship.

In 1957, the Israeli government designated the Druze a distinct religious community at the request of its communal leaders. The Druze are Arabic-speaking citizens of Israel and serve in the Israel Defense Forces, just as most citizens do in Israel. Members of the community have attained top positions in Israeli politics and public service. The number of Druze parliament members usually exceeds their proportion in the Israeli population, and they are integrated within several political parties.

Some scholars maintain that Israel has tried to separate the Druze from other Arab communities, and that the effort has influenced the way Israel's Druze perceive their modern identity. Survey data suggests that Israeli Druze prioritize their identity first as Druze (religiously), second as Arabs (culturally and ethnically), and third as Israelis (citizenship-wise). A small minority of them identify as Palestinians, distinguishing them from the majority of other Arab citizens of Israel, who predominantly identify as Palestinians.

=== In Jordan ===
The Druze form a religious minority in Jordan of around 32,000, mostly residing in the northwestern part of the country. The main areas where they live are Amman, Azraq, Zarqa, Russiefa, Umm Al-Quttein, Aqaba and Mafraq. Druze settlement in Jordan began in 1918, when 22 Druze families left Jabal al-Druze for al-Azraq following the withdrawal of the Turks from the region.

=== In the diaspora ===
Venezuela hosts the largest Druze communities outside the Middle East, estimated at 60,000 individuals. Most of them trace their ancestry back to Lebanon and Syria. More than 200,000 people from the Suwayda area hold Venezuelan citizenship, the majority of whom belong to the Syria's Druze sect and immigrated to Venezuela in the past century. Arab immigration to Venezuela started as early as the 19th and 20th centuries, with migrants primarily hailing from the Ottoman provinces of Lebanon, Syria, and Palestine. They settled predominantly in Caracas, and have significantly influenced Venezuelan culture, particularly in terms of Arabic food and music. Religiously, the Arab-Venezuelans community consists mainly of Druze and Christians, who are affiliated with the Roman Catholic, Eastern Orthodox and Eastern Rite Catholic Churches. The early Druze migrants to Venezuela assimilated well into the local population, with some even converting Catholicism. Nevertheless, many retained a strong Druze and Arab identity, along with adherence to Druze values. A prominent example of Druze influence in Venezuela is the former vice president, Tareck El Aissami, who is of Druze descent. Other notable Venezuelan figures of Druze origin include Haifa El Aissami and Tarek William Saab.

The United States is the second largest home of Druze communities outside the Middle East after Venezuela. Estimates vary between about 30,000 and 50,000 Druzes in the United States, with the largest concentration in Southern California. American Druze are mostly of Lebanese and Syrian descent. Members of the Druze faith face the difficulty of finding a Druze partner and practicing endogamy; marriage outside the Druze faith is strongly discouraged according to the Druze doctrine. They also face the pressure of keeping the religion alive because many Druze immigrants to the United States had converted to Protestantism, becoming communicants of the Presbyterian or Methodist churches.

== Beliefs ==
=== God ===
The Druze conception of the deity is declared by them to be one of strict and uncompromising unity. The main Druze doctrine states that God is both transcendent and immanent, in which he is above all attributes, but at the same time, he is present.

In their desire to maintain a rigid confession of unity, they stripped from God all attributes (tanzīh). In God, there are no attributes distinct from his essence. He is wise, mighty, and just, not by wisdom, might, and justice, but by his own essence. God is "the whole of existence", rather than merely "above existence" or on his throne, which would make him "limited". There is neither "how", "when", nor "where" about him; in this way, he is incomprehensible.

In this dogma, they are similar to the semi-philosophical, semi-religious body which flourished under Al-Ma'mun and was known by the name of Mu'tazila and the fraternal order of the Brethren of Purity (Ikhwan al-Ṣafa).

Unlike the Mu'tazila, and similar to some branches of Sufism, the Druze believe in the concept of Tajalli (meaning "theophany"). Tajalli is often misunderstood by scholars and writers and is usually confused with the concept of incarnation.

[Incarnation] is the core spiritual beliefs in the Druze and some other intellectual and spiritual traditions ... In a mystical sense, it refers to the light of God experienced by certain mystics who have reached a high level of purity in their spiritual journey. Thus, God is perceived as the Lahut [the divine] who manifests His Light in the Station (Maqaam) of the Nasut [material realm] without the Nasut becoming Lahut. This is like one's image in the mirror: One is in the mirror, but does not become the mirror. The Druze manuscripts are emphatic and warn against the belief that the Nasut is God ... Neglecting this warning, individual seekers, scholars, and other spectators have considered al-Hakim and other figures divine. ... In the Druze scriptural view, Tajalli takes a central stage. One author comments that Tajalli occurs when the seeker's humanity is annihilated so that divine attributes and light are experienced by the person.

=== Scriptures ===
Druze sacred texts include the Quran and the Epistles of Wisdom. Other ancient Druze writings include the Rasa'il al-Hind (Epistles of India) and the previously lost or hidden manuscripts such as al-Munfarid bi-Dhatihi and al-Sharia al-Ruhaniyya, as well as others such as didactic and polemic treatises.

=== Reincarnation ===
Reincarnation is a paramount principle in the Druze faith. Reincarnations occur instantly at one's death because there is an eternal duality of the body and the soul and it is impossible for the soul to exist without the body. A human soul will transfer only to a human body, in contrast to the Neoplatonic, Hindu and Buddhist belief systems, according to which souls can transfer to any living creature. Furthermore, a male Druze can be reincarnated only as another male Druze and a female Druze only as another female Druze. A Druze cannot be reincarnated in the body of a non-Druze. Additionally, souls cannot be divided and the number of souls existing in the universe is finite. The cycle of rebirth is continuous and the only way to escape is through successive reincarnations. When this occurs, the soul is united with the Cosmic Mind and achieves the ultimate happiness.

=== Pact of Time Custodian ===
The Pact of Time Custodian (Mithāq Walī al-zamān) is considered the entrance to the Druze religion, and they believe that all Druze in their past lives have signed this Charter, and Druze believe that this Charter embodies with human souls after death.

I rely on our Moula Al-Hakim the lonely God, the individual, the eternal, who is out of couples and numbers, (someone) the son of (someone) has approved recognition enjoined on himself and on his soul, in a healthy of his mind and his body, permissibility aversive is obedient and not forced, to repudiate from all creeds, articles and all religions and beliefs on the differences varieties, and he does not know something except obedience of almighty Moulana Al-Hakim, and obedience is worship and that it does not engage in worship anyone ever attended or wait, and that he had handed his soul and his body and his money and all he owns to almighty Maulana Al-Hakim.

The Druze also use a similar formula, called al-'ahd, when one is initiated into the ʻUqqāl.

=== Sanctuaries ===
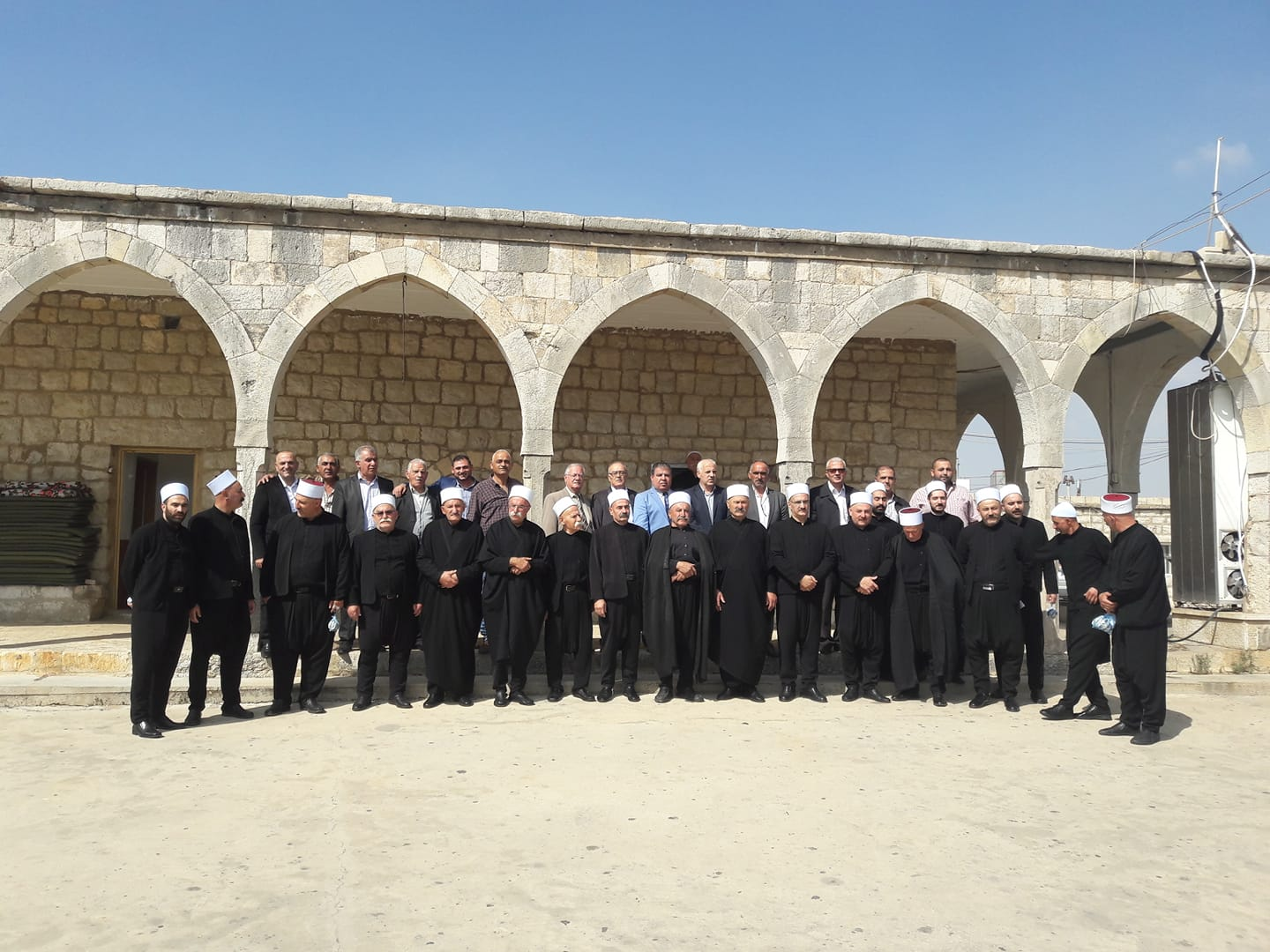
Druze clerics in Khalwat al-Bayada

The prayer-houses of the Druze are called khilwa, khalwa, khilwat or khalwat. The primary sanctuary of the Druze is at Khalwat al-Bayada.

=== Esotericism ===
The Druze believe that many teachings given by prophets, religious leaders and holy books have esoteric meanings preserved for those of intellect, in which some teachings are symbolic and allegorical in nature, and divide the understanding of holy books and teachings into three layers.

These layers, according to the Druze, are as follows:

- The obvious or exoteric (zahir), accessible to anyone who can read or hear;
- The hidden or esoteric (batin), accessible to those who are willing to search and learn through the concept of exegesis;
- And the hidden of the hidden, a concept known as anagoge, inaccessible to all but a few really enlightened individuals who truly understand the nature of the universe.

Druze do not believe that the esoteric meaning abrogates or necessarily abolishes the exoteric one. Hamza bin Ali refutes such claims by stating that if the esoteric interpretation of taharah (purity) is purity of the heart and soul, it doesn't mean that a person can discard his physical purity, as salat (prayer) is useless if a person is untruthful in his speech and that the esoteric and exoteric meanings complement each other.

=== Seven Druze precepts ===
The Druze follow seven moral precepts or duties that are considered the core of the faith. The Seven Druze precepts are:

1. Veracity in speech and the truthfulness of the tongue.
2. Protection and mutual aid to the brethren in faith.
3. Renunciation of all forms of former worship (specifically, invalid creeds) and false belief.
4. Repudiation of the devil (Iblis), and all forces of evil (translated from Arabic Toghyan, meaning "despotism").
5. Confession of God's unity.
6. Acquiescence in God's acts no matter what they be.
7. Absolute submission and resignation to God's divine will in both secret and public.

=== Taqiyya ===
Complicating their identity is the custom of taqiyya—concealing or disguising their beliefs when necessary—that they adopted from Ismailism and the esoteric nature of the faith, in which many teachings are kept secretive. This is done in order to keep the religion from those who are not yet prepared to accept the teachings and therefore could misunderstand it, as well as to protect the community when it is in danger. Some claim to be Muslim or Christian in order to avoid persecution; some do not. Druze in different states can have radically different lifestyles.

=== Theophany ===
Hamza ibn Ali ibn Ahmad is considered the founder of the Druze and the primary author of the Druze manuscripts. He proclaimed that God had become human and taken the form of man. Al-Hakim bi-Amr Allah is an important figure in the Druze faith whose eponymous founder ad-Darazi proclaimed him as the incarnation of God in 1018. The Druze believe that al-Hākim will return at the end of times to judge the world and establish his kingdom, while Hamza ibn Ali is considered a reincarnation of Jesus, the Universal Mind 'Aql, closely associated with al-Hākim.

The author of the epistle "The Report of the Jewish and Christians" (Khabar al-Yahud wal Nasara), part of first volume of the Epistles of Wisdom, appears to have been a Druze individual. The account itself identifies him as Hamza ibn Ali, a supporter of al-Hakim's divinity and the founder of the Druze faith.

Historian David R. W. Bryer defines the Druzes as ghulat of Isma'ilism, since they exaggerated the cult of the caliph al-Hakim bi-Amr Allah and considered him divine; he also defines the Druzes as a religion that deviated from Islam. He also added that as a result of this deviation, the Druze faith "seems as different from Islam as Islam is from Christianity or Christianity is from Judaism".

=== Prophethood ===
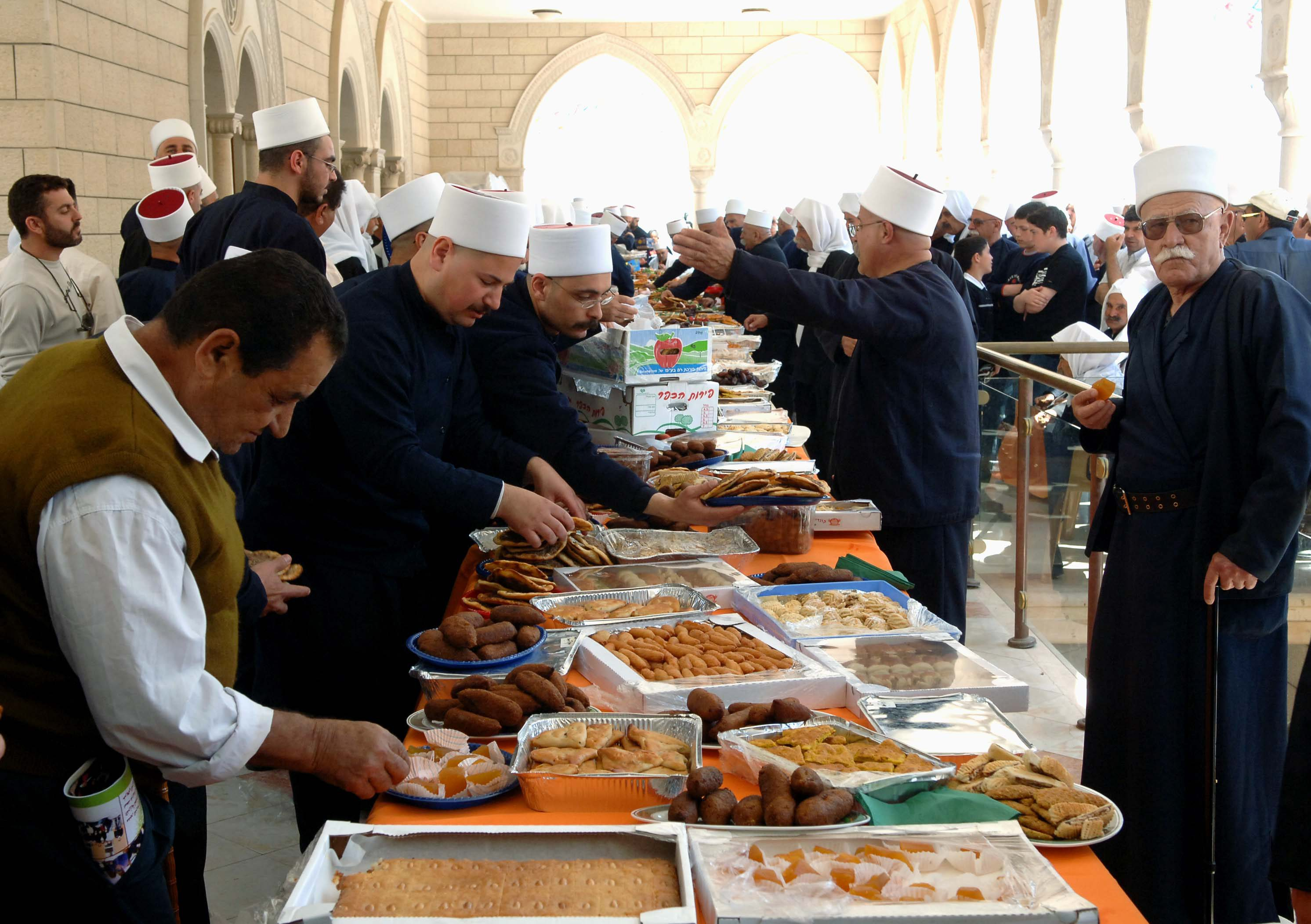
Druze dignitaries celebrating the Nabi Shu'ayb festival at the tomb of the prophet in Hittin, Israel

Recognition of prophets in the Druze religion is divided into three subcategories: the prophet themselves (natiq), their disciples (asas), and witnesses to their message (hujjah).

The number 5 contains an unstated significance within the region in which the Druze faith is practised; it is believed in this area that great prophets come in groups of five. In the time of the ancient Greeks, these five were represented by Pythagoras, Plato, Aristotle, Parmenides, and Empedocles. In the first century, the five were represented by Jesus Christ, John the Baptist, Saint Matthew, Saint Mark, and Saint Luke. In the time of the faith's foundation, the five were Hamza ibn Ali ibn Ahmad, Muḥammad ibn Wahb al-Qurashī, Abū'l-Khayr Salama ibn Abd al-Wahhab al-Samurri, Ismāʿīl ibn Muḥammad at-Tamīmī, and Al-Muqtana Baha'uddin.

Druze tradition honors and reveres Hamza ibn Ali Ahmad and Salman the Persian as "mentors" and "prophets", believed to be reincarnations of the monotheistic idea.

=== Other beliefs ===
The Druze allow divorce, although it is discouraged, and circumcision is not necessary. Apostasy is forbidden, and they usually have religious services on Thursday evenings. Druze follow Sunni Hanafi law on issues which their own faith has no particular rulings about.

Formal Druze worship is confined to weekly meeting on Thursday evenings, during which all members of community gather together to discuss local issues before those not initiated into the secrets of the faith (the juhhāl, or the ignorant) are dismissed, and those who are "uqqāl" or "enlightened" (those few initiated in the Druze holy books) remain to read and study.

== Religious symbol ==

The Druze strictly avoid iconography, but use five colors ("Five Limits" خمس حدود khams ḥudūd) as a religious symbol: green, red, yellow, blue, and white. The five limits were listed by Ismail at-Tamimi (d. 1030) in the Epistle of the Candle (risālat aš-šamʿa) as:

- First limit: Hamza ibn Ali (حمزة إبن علي إبن أحمد) (or Jesus according to other sources)
- Second limit: Ismail ibn Muhamed ibn Hamed at-Tamimi (Ismail at-Tamimi) (إسماعيل إبن محمد بن حامد التميمي)
- Third limit: Muhamed ibn Wahb (محمد إبن وهب)
- Fourth limit (as-Sabiq the anterior): Salama ibn abd al-Wahhab (سلامة إبن عبد الوهاب)
- Fifth limit (al-llahiq the posterior): Ali ibn Ahmed as-Samouqi (علي إبن أحمد السموقي)

Each of the colors representing the five limits pertains to a metaphysical power called ḥadd, literally "a limit", as in the distinctions that separate humans from animals, or the powers that make humans the animalistic body. Each ḥadd is color-coded in the following manner:

- Green for ʻAql "the Universal Mind/Intelligence/Nous",
- Red for Nafs "the Universal Soul/Anima mundi",
- Yellow for Kalima "the Word/Logos",
- Blue for Sābiq (السابق) "the anterior/potentiality/cause/precedent", the first intellect.
- White for al-llahiq (اللاحق) "the posterior/future/effect/Immanence".

The mind generates qualia and gives consciousness. The soul embodies the mind and is responsible for transmigration and the character of oneself. The word, which is the atom of language, communicates qualia between humans and represents the platonic forms in the sensible world. The Sābiq and Tālī is the ability to perceive and learn from the past and plan for the future and predict it.

The colors can be arranged in vertically descending stripes (as a flag), or a five-pointed star. The stripes are a diagrammatic cut of the spheres in neoplatonic philosophy, while the five-pointed star embodies the golden ratio, phi, as a symbol of temperance and a life of moderation.

== Prayer houses and holy places ==
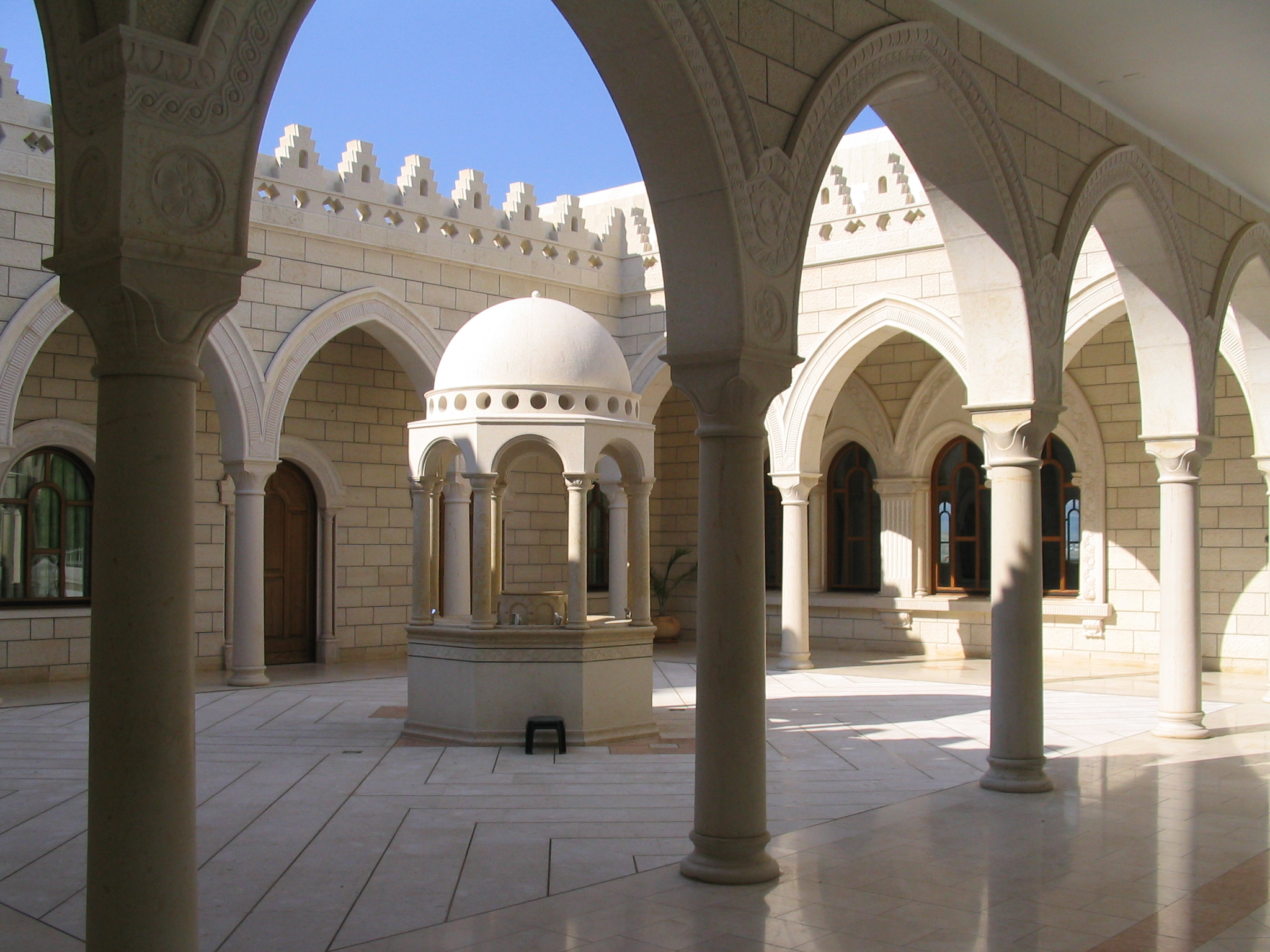
Jethro shrine and temple of Druze in Hittin, northern Israel

Holy places of the Druze are archaeological sites important to the community and associated with religious holidays; the most notable example being Nabi Shu'ayb, dedicated to Jethro, who is a central figure of the Druze religion. Druze make pilgrimages to this site on the holiday of Ziyarat al-Nabi Shu'ayb.

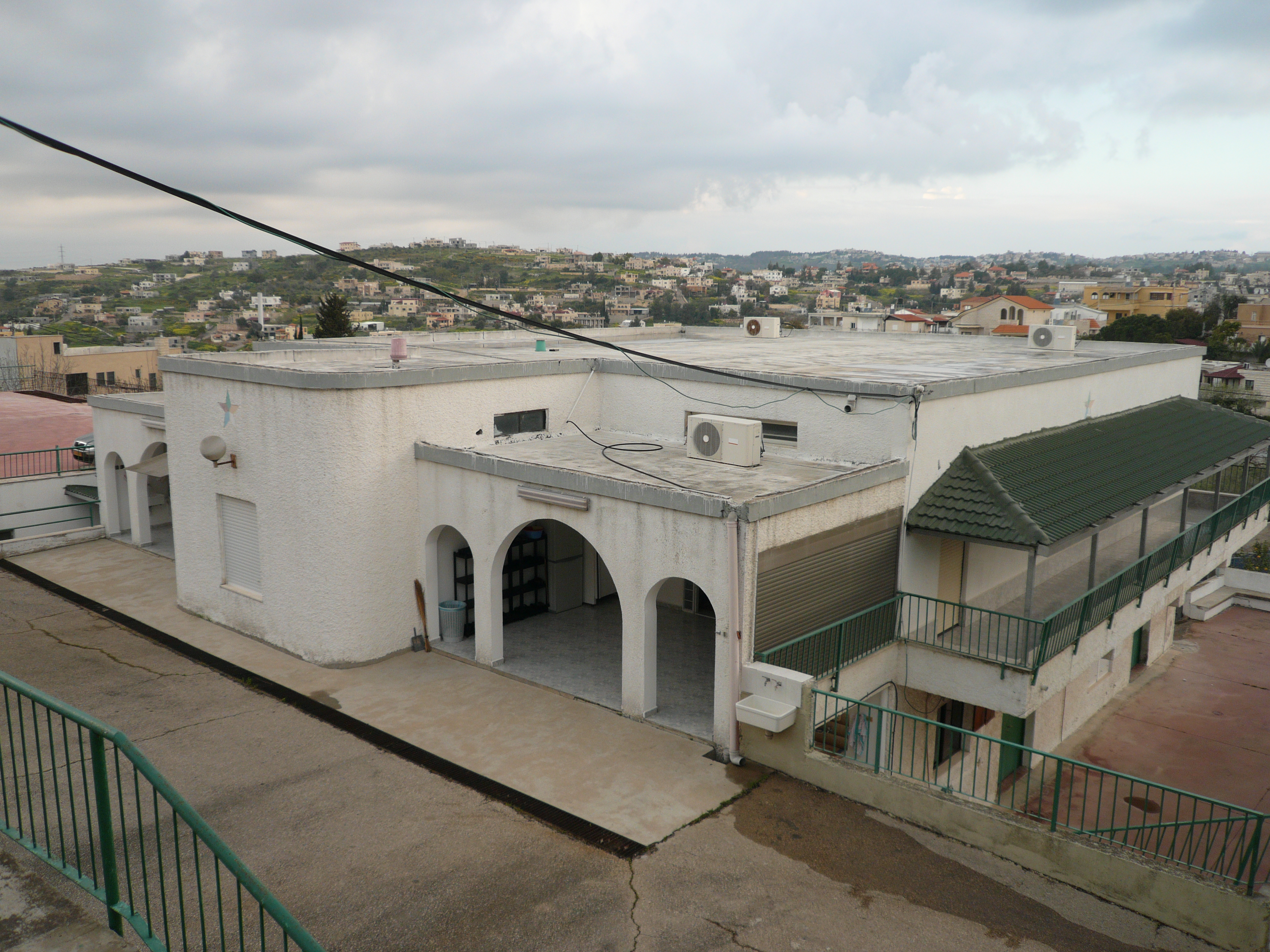
Druze prayer house in Daliat al-Karmel, Israel

One of the most important features of the Druze village having a central role in social life is the khilwa or khalwa—a house of prayer, retreat and religious unity. The khalwat may be known as majlis in local languages.

The second type of religious shrine is one associated with the anniversary of a historic event or death of a prophet. If it is a mausoleum the Druze call it mazār and if it is a shrine they call it maqām. The holy places become more important to the community in times of adversity and calamity. The holy places and shrines of the Druze are scattered in various villages, in places where they are protected and cared for. They are found in Syria, Lebanon and Israel.

== Initiates and "ignorant" members ==
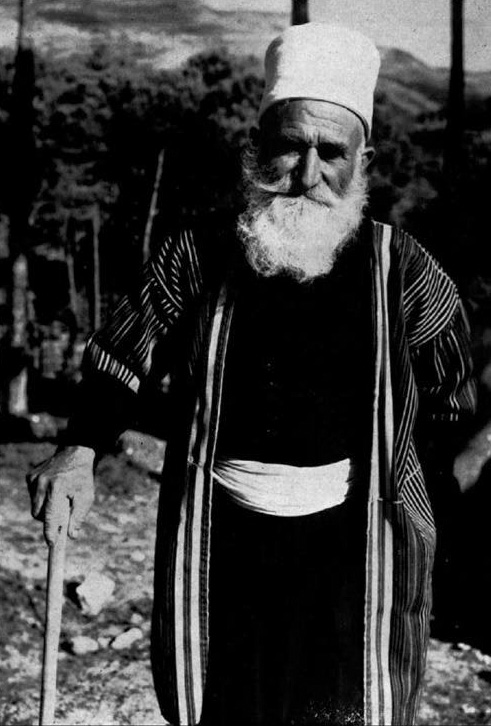
Druze sheikh (ʻuqqāl) wearing religious dress

The Druze do not recognize any religious hierarchy. As such, there is no "Druze clergy". Those few initiated in the Druze holy books are called عقال ʻuqqāl ("the wise"), while the regular members of the group are called جهال juhhāl ("the ignorant"). Some find this classification disparaging however, and as such, terms like روحاني rūḥāniyy, meaning "(concerned with the) spiritual", and جسماني jismāniyy, meaning "(concerned with the) physical", are also used.

Given the strict religious, intellectual and spiritual requirements, most of the Druze are not initiated and might be referred to as al-Juhhāl (جهال), literally "the Ignorant", but in practice referring to the non-initiated Druze. However, that term is seldom used by the Druze. Those Druze are not granted access to the Druze holy literature or allowed to attend the initiated religious meetings of the ʻuqqāl. The "juhhāl" are the vast majority of the Druze community. The cohesiveness and frequent inter-community social interaction, however, enables most Druze to have an idea about their broad ethical requirements and have some sense of what their theology consists of (albeit often flawed).

The initiated religious group, which includes both men and women (less than 10% of the population), is called al-ʻUqqāl (عقال "the Knowledgeable Initiates"). They might or might not dress differently, although most wear a costume that was characteristic of mountain people in previous centuries. Women can opt to wear al-mandīl, a loose white veil, especially in the presence of other people. They wear al-mandīl on their heads to cover their hair and wrap it around their mouths. They wear black shirts and long skirts covering their legs to their ankles. Male ʻuqqāl often grow mustaches, and wear dark Levantine-Turkish traditional dresses, called the shirwal, with white turbans that vary according to the seniority of the ʻuqqāl. Traditionally the Druze women have played an important role both socially and religiously inside the community.

Al-ʻuqqāl have equal rights to al-Juhhāl, but establish a hierarchy of respect based on religious service. The most influential of al-ʻuqqāl become Ajawīd, recognized religious leaders, and from this group the spiritual leaders of the Druze are assigned. While the Shaykh al-ʻAql, which is an official position in Syria, Lebanon, and Israel, is elected by the local community and serves as the head of the Druze religious council, judges from the Druze religious courts are usually elected for this position. Unlike the spiritual leaders, the authority of the Shaykh al-ʻAql is limited to the country he is elected in, though in some instances spiritual leaders are elected to this position.

The Druze believe in the unity of God, and are often known as the "People of Monotheism" or simply "Monotheists". Their theology has a Neo-Platonic view about how God interacts with the world through emanations and is similar to some gnostic and other esoteric sects. Druze philosophy also shows Sufi influences.

Druze principles focus on honesty, loyalty, filial piety, altruism, patriotic sacrifice, and monotheism. They reject nicotine, alcohol, and other drugs and often, the consumption of pork (to the Uqqāl and not necessarily to the Juhhāl). Druze reject polygamy, believe in reincarnation, and are not obliged to observe most of the religious rituals. The Druze believe that rituals are symbolic and have an individualistic effect on the person, for which reason Druze are free to perform them, or not. The community does celebrate Eid al-Adha, however, considered their most significant holiday; though their form of observance is different compared to that of most Muslims.

== Culture ==
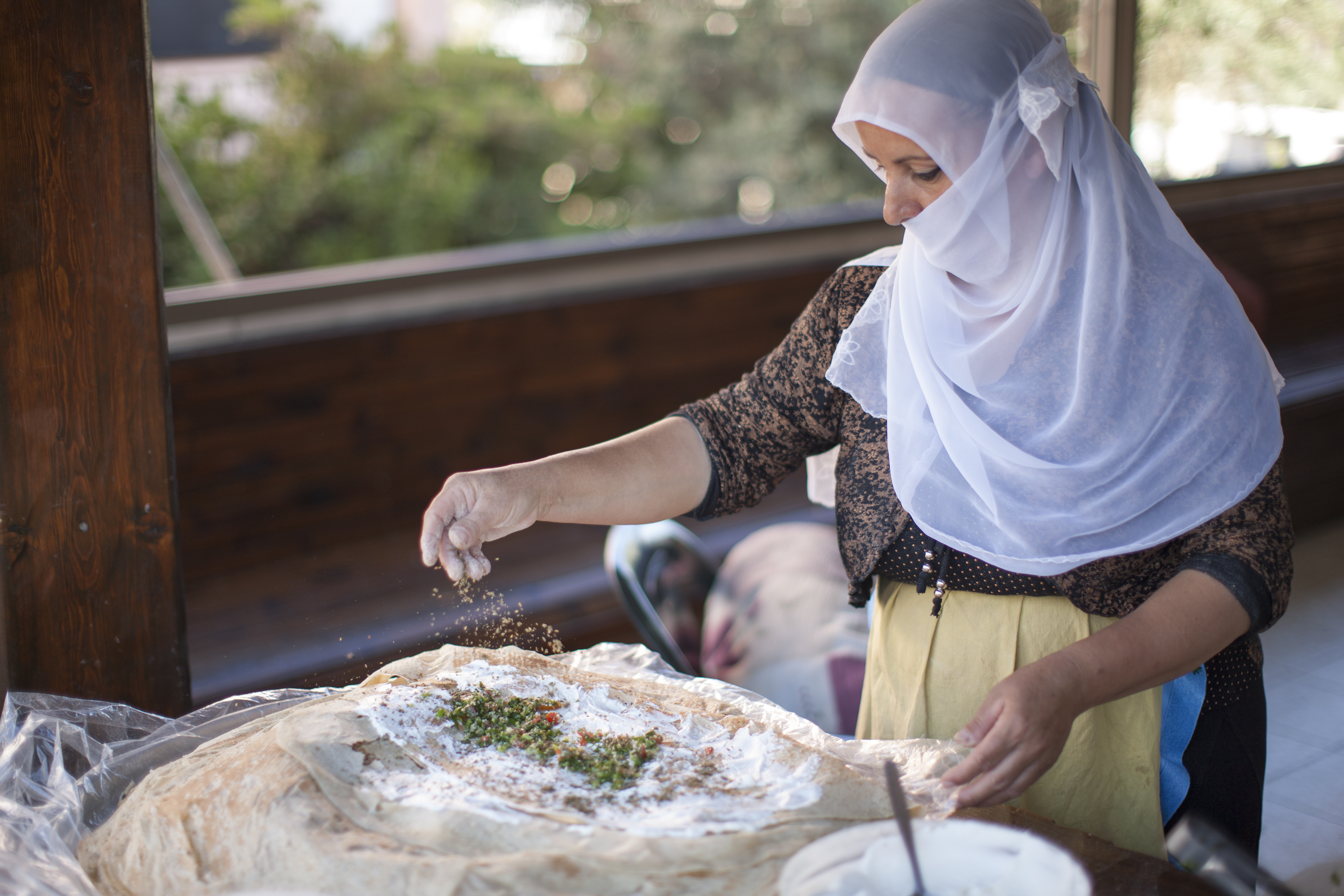
A Druze woman preparing a traditional dish

The Druze community maintains Arabic language and culture as core elements of their identity. Arabic is their primary language, and Druze cultural practices and traditions are deeply intertwined with the broader Arab heritage. While the Druze have their unique religious beliefs and customs, they actively preserve and contribute to Arabic cultural and social life in the Levant. They have had a significant impact on the region's history and culture and continue to play a notable political role.

Traditionally, most Druze are not initiated into the deeper secrets of the faith and are considered "juhhāl", or "the ignorant". Only a minority, known as the "uqqāl" or "enlightened", are initiated into the Druze holy books and engage in religious study. The religious life of the average Druze ("juhhāl") revolves around a very small number of events—birth and circumcision, engagement and marriage, death and burial—and is devoid of special Druze prayers or worship. Marriage outside the Druze faith is forbidden, and if a Druze marries a non-Druze, the Druze may be ostracized and marginalized by their community. Because a non-Druze partner cannot convert to Druze faith, the couple cannot have Druze children, because the Druze faith can only be passed on through birth to two Druze parents.

Circumcision is widely practiced by the Druze. The procedure is practiced as a cultural tradition, and has no religious significance in the Druze faith. There is no special date for this act in the Druze faith: male Druze infants are usually circumcised shortly after birth, however some remain uncircumcised until the age of ten or older. Some Druze do not circumcise their male children, and refuse to observe this "common Muslim practice".

Druze communities are often close-knit and maintain a strong sense of identity and solidarity. A key aspect of their religious practice includes ziyarat, or visits to holy places. One of the most significant events in Druze religious life is the annual pilgrimage to the Shrine of Shu'ayb, observed between 25 and 28 April. This pilgrimage is dedicated to Shu'ayb, whom Druze believe to be a prophet and whose purported tomb is located at this shrine. This event is so important that it is officially recognized as a public holiday in Israel.

=== Language ===
The mother tongue of Druze in Syria, Lebanon and Israel is Levantine Arabic, except those born and living in the Druze diaspora such as Venezuela, where Arabic was not taught or spoken at home. The Druze Arabic dialect, especially in the rural areas, is often different from the other regional Arabic dialects. Druze Arabic dialect is distinguished from others by retention of the phoneme /q/, the use of which by Druze is particularly prominent in the mountains and less so in urban areas.

The Druze citizens of Israel are Arabic in language and culture, and linguistically speaking, the majority of them are fluently bilingual, speaking both a Central Northern Levantine Arabic dialect and Hebrew. In Druze Arab homes and towns in Israel, the primary language spoken is Arabic, while some Hebrew words have entered the colloquial Arabic dialect. They often use Hebrew characters to write their Arabic dialect online.

=== Cultural identity ===
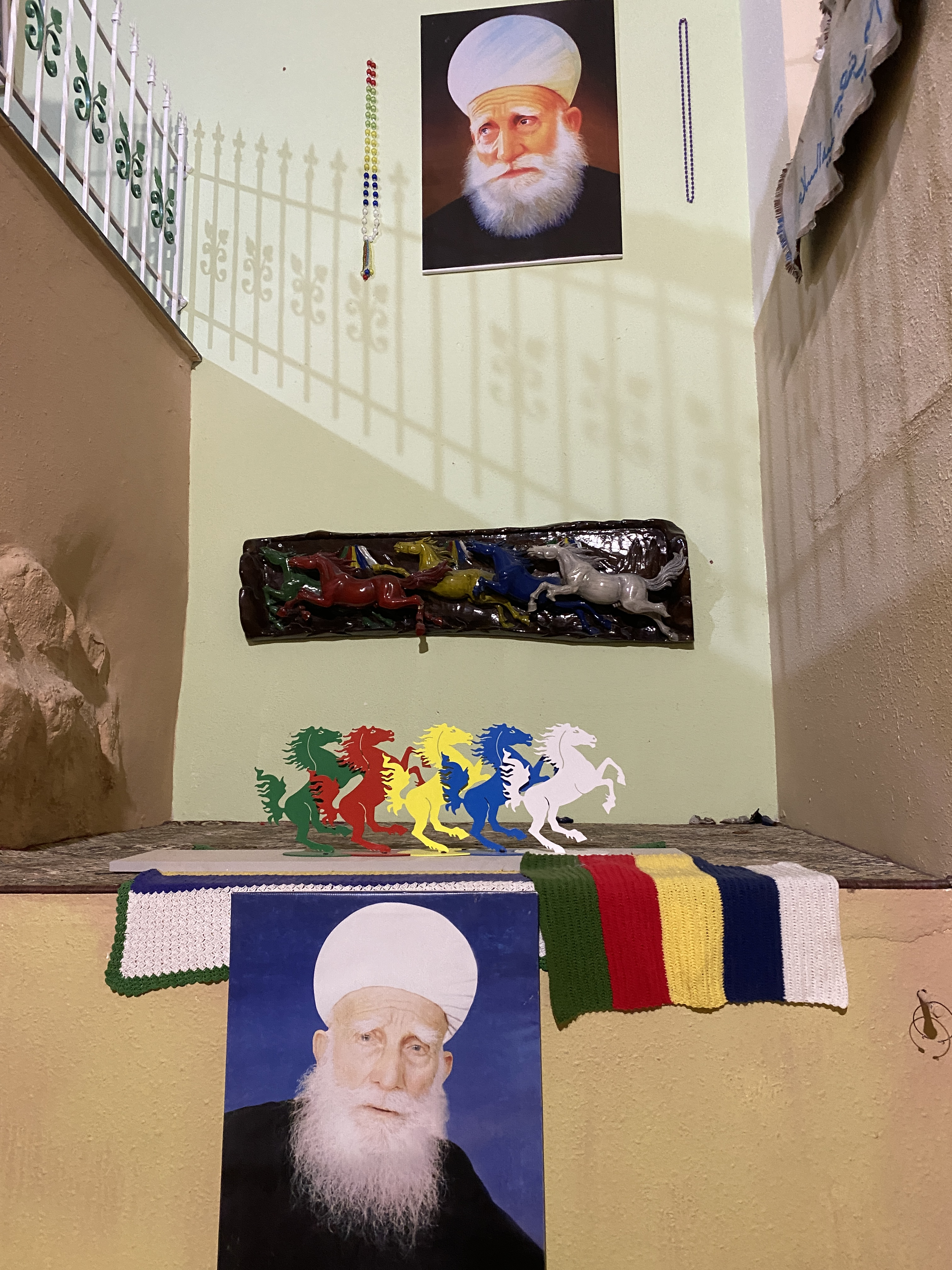
Inside the Maqam Baha al-Din in Beit Jann

Various scholars agree that the Druze community's cultural identity is deeply intertwined with their Arab heritage. Historian Nejla Abu-Izzedin and Kamal Salibi both argue that the Druze are profoundly embedded within the Arab cultural framework, as demonstrated by their common language and social customs. They assert that this integration is apparent through the Druze's active participation in regional traditions and their assimilation into Arab society, despite their distinct religious and philosophical beliefs.

Scholar Robert Brenton Betts explains that the Druze social structure is characterized by a strong sense of community and the leadership of religious elders known as 'sheikhs'. These leaders are pivotal in guiding both the spiritual and social aspects of Druze life, which is crucial for preserving their unique identity. Betts also points to specific Druze practices, such as the annual pilgrimage to the Shrine of Shu'ayb, as examples of how these traditions, along with the role of the sheikhs, are deeply ingrained in Druze social life. He argues that these practices are not just religious rituals but are fundamental to reinforcing Druze unity and continuity.

According to some scholars, the Druze cultural identity is shaped by their interactions with both Christian and Muslim communities, reflecting a synthesis of religious and cultural influences. Historians notes that the Druze have historically maintained a positive relationship with Christians, as evidenced by shared traditions and social practices in Mount Lebanon. This interaction has led to overlapping symbols, customs, mutual veneration of saints and their shrines, and shared terminology for God. Sites such as the Church of Saidet et Tallé in Deir el Qamar, historically a popular Marian pilgrimage site among the Druze, exemplify this cultural exchange. The Druze also venerate Christian saints like Saint George and the Prophet Elijah, admired for their "bravery and warrior-like qualities". Scholar Pierre-Yves Beaurepaire observes that these warrior saints resonate with the Druze due to their parallels with Druze militarized traditions. The baptism of children, in line with Christian tradition, was common among prominent Lebanese Druze families. Historian Aharon Layish notes that there is clear evidence of Druzes in Lebanon during the Ottoman period who posed as Christians for practical reasons.

Conversely, despite sharing historical roots with Muslims, the Druze often experience a more complex relationship with Muslim communities due to their distinct religious beliefs and practices. Historically, the Druze faced significant persecution from Muslim regimes, which led them to keep their religious beliefs secret. According to Druze narrative, these acts of persecution were aimed at eradicating the entire community. This narrative has shaped the Druze sense of identity and their awareness of survival. As a survival strategy, some Druze have historically posed as Muslims, a practice known as taqiya. This concealment has led to a synthesis of Druze religious practice and cultural identity with Islamic elements, as noted by scholars.

=== Cuisine ===
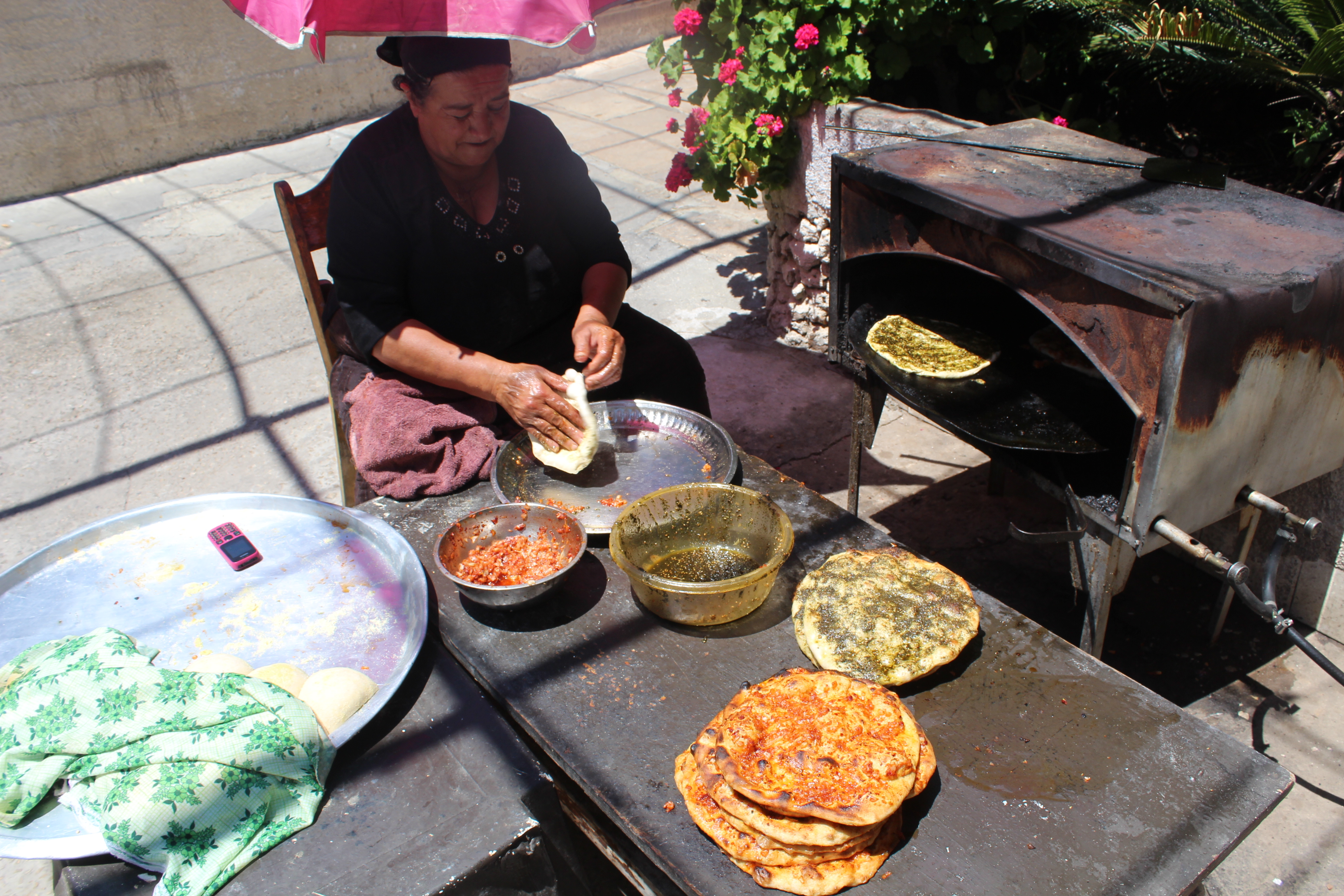
Druze woman making "Druze pita" (Saj bread) in Isfiya, Israel

Druze cuisine is Arab cuisine, and shares many similarities with other Levantine cuisines. It features a rich array of grains, meat, potato, cheese, bread, whole grains, fruits, vegetables, fresh fish and tomatoes. A hallmark of Druze and Levantine cuisine is meze including tabbouleh, hummus and baba ghanoush. Kibbeh nayyeh is also a popular mezze among the Druze. Other well-known dishes among Druzes include falafel, sfiha, shawarma, dolma, kibbeh, kusa mahshi, shishbarak, muhammara, and mujaddara. Among the popular traditional Arabic dessert by the Druze is Knafeh. In Israel, the Saj bread is known as "Druze Pita" as it was easier for Israeli Jews to identify with Druze than with Arabs. It is a pita filled with labneh (thick yoghurt) and topped with olive oil and za'atar, and a very popular bread in Israel. Al-Meleh a popular dish among Druze in Hauran region (Suwayda Governorate), cooked in a pressure cooker and served on huge special plates at weddings, holidays, and other special occasions. And consists of bulgur wheat immersed in ghee with lamb and yogurt, and served hot with fried kibbeh and vegetables.

For reasons that remain unclear, the Mulukhiyah dish was banned by the Fatimid Caliph Al-Hakim bi-Amr Allah sometime during his reign (996–1021). While the ban was eventually lifted after the end of his reign, the Druze, who hold Al-Hakim in high regard and give him quasi-divine authority, continue to respect the ban, and do not eat Mulukhiyah of any kind to this day.

Mate (in Levantine Arabic, متة /mæte/) is a popular drink consumed by the Druze brought to the Levant by Syrian migrants from Argentina in the 19th century. Mate is made by steeping dried leaves of the South American yerba mate plant in hot water and is served with a metal straw (بمبيجة bambīja or مصاصة maṣṣāṣah) from a gourd (فنجان finjān or قَرْعَة qarʻah). Mate is often the first item served when entering a Druze home. It is a social drink and can be shared between multiple participants. After each drinker, the metal straw is cleaned with lemon rind. Traditional snacks eaten with mate include raisins, nuts, dried figs, biscuits, and chips.

=== Marriage ===
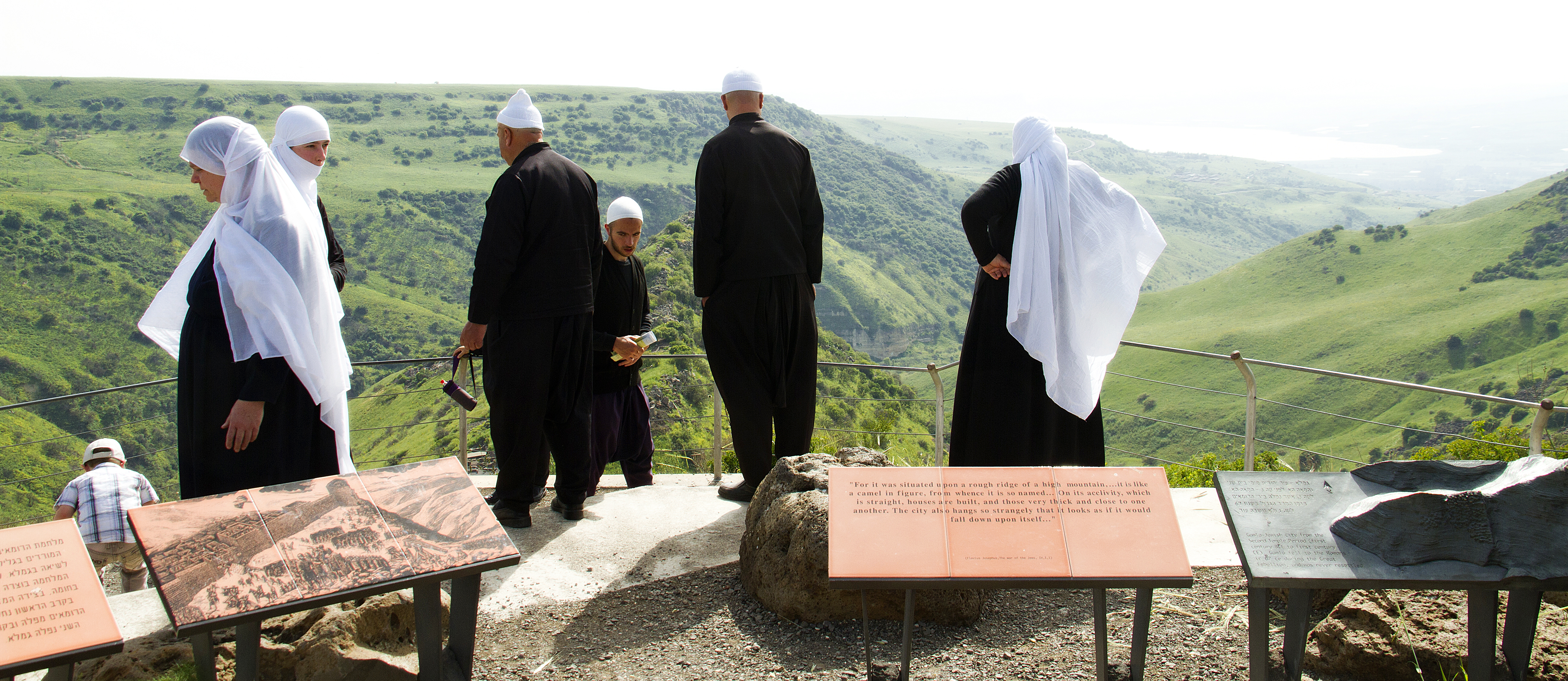
Israeli Druze family visiting Gamla; wearing religious dress

The Druze rejection of polygamy, in contrast to Islamic tradition, reflects a significant influence from Christianity on their faith. While the Druze cite certain Quranic verses to justify their position, it more closely mirrors the Christian perspective on marriage. Additionally, the practice of monasticism by some Druze sheikhs is highly regarded within their community. It is not uncommon for a sheikh to request celibacy from his fiancée, and many Druze sheikhs remain unmarried throughout their lives. In Druze belief, sex is seen not as an end in itself but as a means of reproduction, with certain sexual forms considered sinful.

The Druze doctrine does not permit outsiders to convert to their religion, as only one who is born to Druze parents can be considered a Druze. Marriage outside the Druze faith is uncommon and strongly discouraged for both males and females. If a Druze individual, whether male or female, marries a non-Druze, they may face ostracism and marginalization from their community. Since a non-Druze partner cannot convert to the Druze faith, the couple cannot have Druze children, as the Druze faith can only be inherited from two Druze parents at birth. Marrying a non-Druze, whether male or female, is viewed as apostasy from the Druze religion. The Druze community holds a negative perception of apostates who marry outside the religion. Consequently, those who leave the Druze religion due to interfaith marriage are forced to leave their village and are exiled to distant, non-Druze areas. This religious and social pressure leads to their isolation and classification as outcasts within their Druze community.

== Relationship with other religions ==
=== Relationship with Muslims ===
The Druze faith is often classified as a branch of Isma'ilism, although according to various scholars Druze faith "diverges substantially from Islam, both Sunni and Shia". Even though the faith originally developed out of Ismaili Islam, most Druze do not identify as Muslims, and they do not accept the five pillars of Islam. Historian David R. W. Bryer defines the Druzes as ghulat of Isma'ilism, since they exaggerated the cult of the caliph al-Hakim bi-Amr Allah and considered him divine; he also defines the Druzes as a religion that deviated from Islam. He also added that as a result of this deviation, the Druze faith "seems as different from Islam as Islam is from Christianity or Christianity is from Judaism".

Historically the relationship between the Druze and Muslims has been characterized by intense persecution. The Druze have frequently experienced persecution by different Muslim regimes such as the Ismaili Fatimid Caliphate, Sunni Mamluk Sultanate, Sunni Ottoman Empire, and Egypt Eyalet. The persecution of the Druze included massacres, demolishing Druze prayer houses and holy places, and forced conversion to Islam. Those acts of persecution were meant to eradicate the whole community according to the Druze narrative. Most recently, the Syrian civil war, which began in 2011, saw persecution of the Druze at the hands of Islamic extremists.

Since Druze emerged from Islam and share certain beliefs with Islam, its position of whether it is a separate religion or a sect of Islam is sometimes controversial among Muslim scholars. Druze are not considered Muslims by those belonging to orthodox Islamic schools of thought. Ibn Taymiyya, a prominent Muslim scholar muhaddith, dismissed the Druze as non-Muslims, and his fatwa cited that Druze: "Are not at the level of ′Ahl al-Kitāb (People of the Book) nor mushrikin (polytheists). Rather, they are from the most deviant kuffār (Infidel) ... Their women can be taken as slaves and their property can be seized ... they are to be killed whenever they are found and cursed as they described ... It is obligatory to kill their scholars and religious figures so that they do not misguide others", which in that setting would have legitimized violence against them as apostates. The Ottoman Empire often relied on Ibn Taymiyya's religious ruling to justify their persecution of Druze. In contrast, according to Ibn Abidin, whose work Radd al-Muhtar 'ala al-Durr al-Mukhtar is still considered the authoritative text of Hanafi fiqh today, the Druze are neither Muslims nor apostates.

In 1959, in an ecumenical move driven by Egyptian president Gamal Abdel Nasser's effort to broaden his political appeal after the establishment of the United Arab Republic between Egypt and Syria in 1958, the Islamic scholar Mahmud Shaltut at Al Azhar University in Cairo classified the Druze as Muslims, even though most Druze no longer consider themselves Muslim. The fatwa declares that the Druze are Muslims because they recite the twofold Shahada, and believe in the Qur'an and monotheism and do not oppose Islam in word or deed. This fatwa was not accepted by all in the Islamic world, many dissenting scholars have argued the Druze recite the Shahada as a form of taqiya; a precautionary dissimulation or denial of religious belief and practice in the face of persecution. Some sects of Islam, including all Shia denominations, don't recognize the religious authority of Al Azhar University, those that do sometimes challenge the religious legitimacy of Shaltut's fatwa because it was issued for political reasons, as Gamal Abdel Nasser saw it as a tool to spread his appeal and influence across the entire Arab world.

In 2012, due to a drift towards Salafism in Al-Azhar, and the ascension of the Muslim Brotherhood into Egyptian political leadership, the dean of the Faculty of Islamic Studies at Al-Azhar issued a fatwa strongly opposed to the 1959 fatwa.

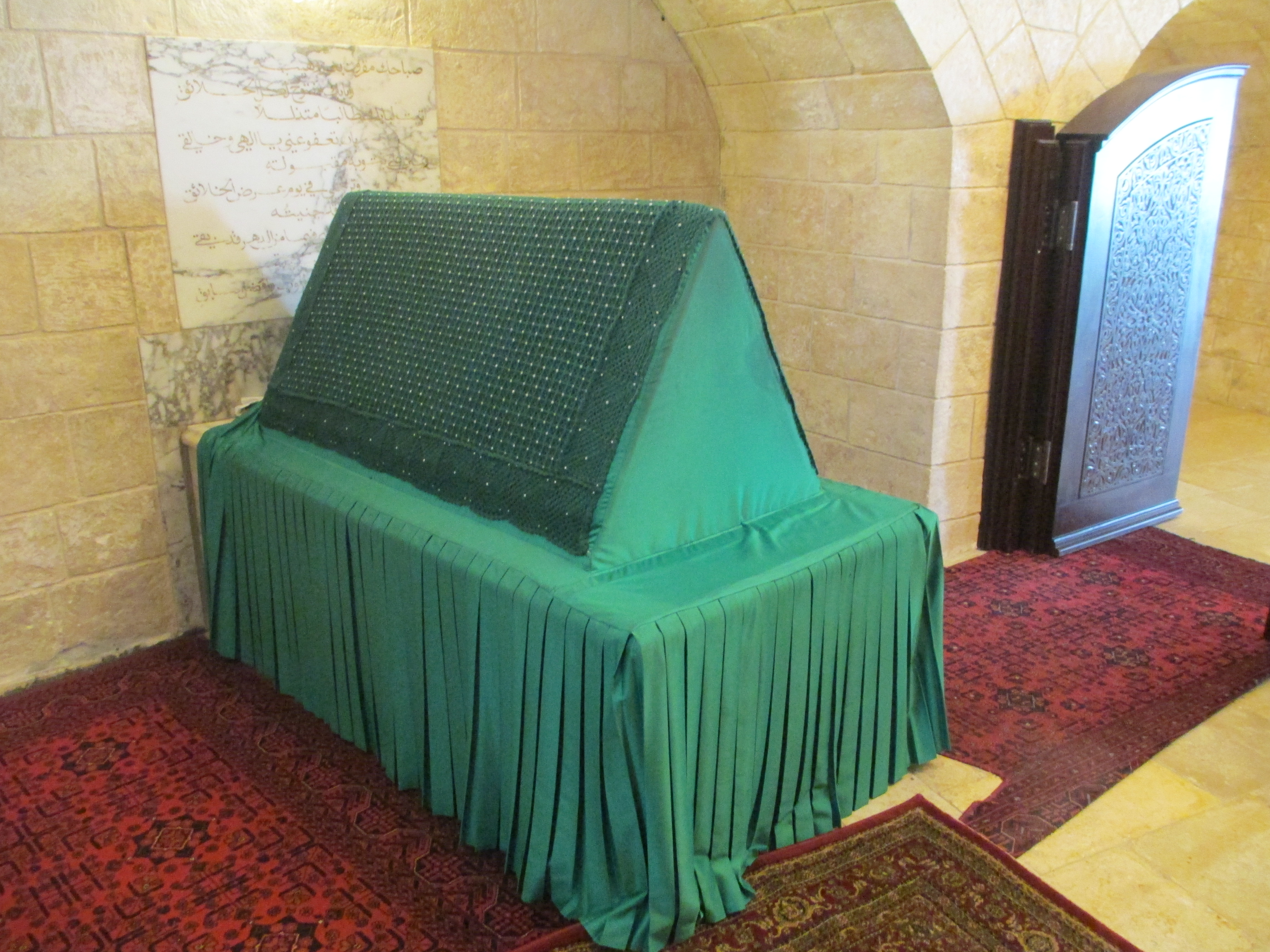
Shuaib (Jethro)'s grave near Hittin, Israel: Both religions venerate Shuaib.

Both religions venerate Shuaib and Muhammad: Shuaib (Jethro) is revered as the chief prophet in the Druze religion, and in Islam he is considered a prophet of God. Muslims regard Muhammad as the final and paramount prophet sent by God, to the Druze, Muhammad is exalted as one of the seven prophets sent by God in different periods of history.

In terms of religious comparison, Islamic schools and branches do not believe in reincarnation, a paramount tenet of the Druze faith. Islam teaches dawah, whereas the Druze do not accept converts to their faith. Marriage outside the Druze faith is rare and is strongly discouraged. Islamic schools and branches allow for divorce and permit men to be married to multiple women, contrary to the views of the Druze in monogamous marriage and not allowing divorce. Differences between Islamic schools and branches and Druze include their belief in the theophany, Hamza ibn Ali ibn Ahmad is considered the founder of the Druze and the primary author of the Druze manuscripts; he proclaimed that God had become human and taken the form of man, Al-Hakim bi-Amr Allah. Within Islam, however, such a concept of theophany is a denial of monotheism.

The Druze faith incorporates some elements of Islam, and other religious beliefs. Druze Sacred texts include the Qur'an and the Epistles of Wisdom (rasail al-hikma رسائل الحكمة) The Druze community does celebrate Eid al-Adha as their most significant holiday; though their form of observance is different compared to that of most Muslims. The Druze faith does not follow Sharia nor any of the Five Pillars of Islam save reciting the Shahada. Scholars argue that Druze recite the Shahada in order to protect their religion and their own safety, and to avoid persecution by Muslims.

=== Relationship with Christians ===
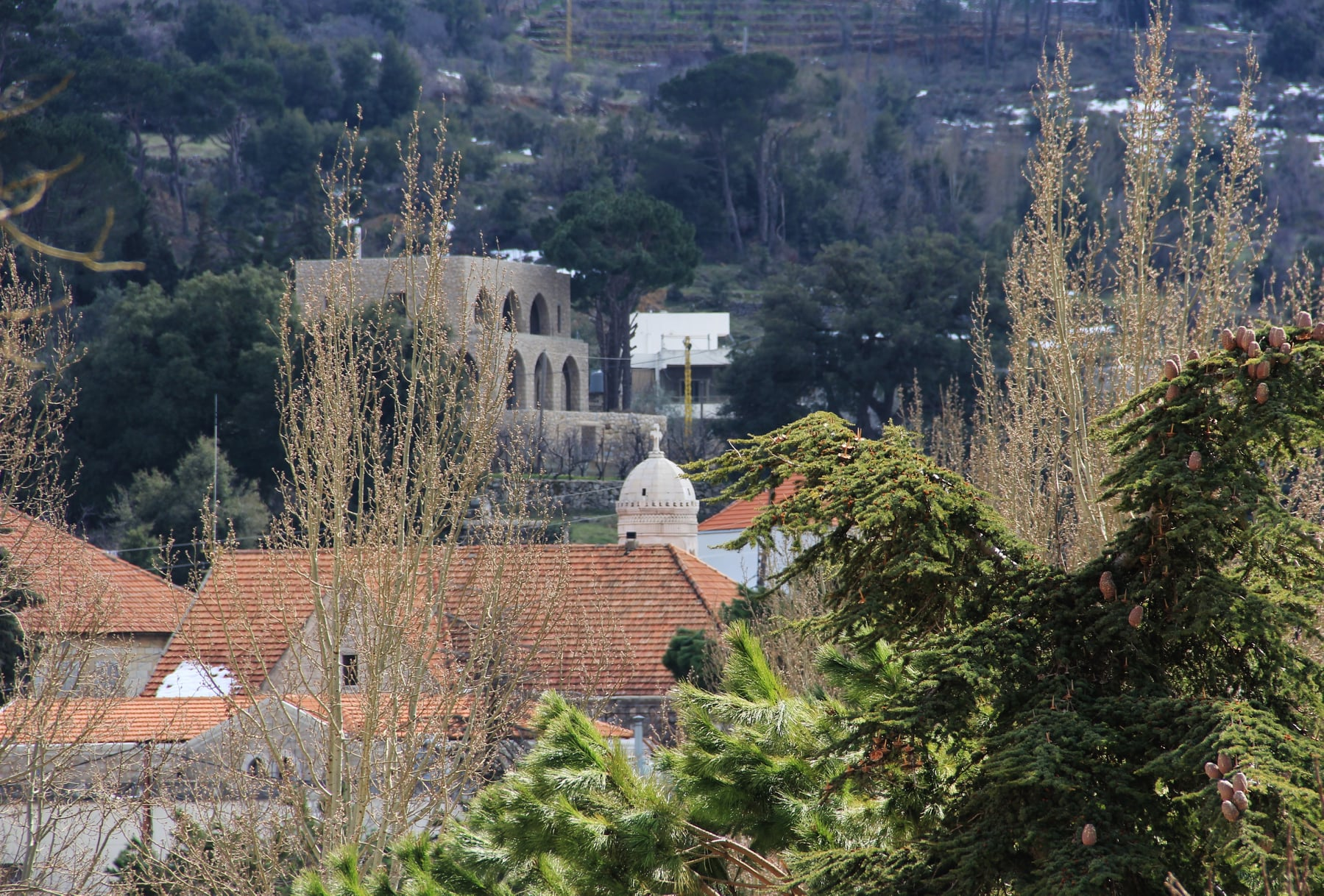
Christian Church and Druze Khalwa in Shuf: Historically; the Druzes and the Christians in the Shuf Mountains lived in complete harmony.

Christianity and Druze are Abrahamic religions that share a historical traditional connection with some major theological differences. The two faiths share a common place of origin in the Middle East and are both monotheistic. The relationship between Druze and Christians has been characterized largely by harmony and peaceful coexistence. Amicable relations between the two groups prevailed throughout most of history, though a few exceptions exist, including the 1860 civil conflict in Mount Lebanon and Damascus. Conversion of Druze to Christianity used to be common practice in the Levant region. Over the centuries, several prominent members of the Druze community have embraced Christianity, including some of Shihab dynasty members, as well as the Abi-Lamma clan.

Christian and Druze communities share a long history of interaction dating back roughly a millennium, particularly in Mount Lebanon. Interaction between Christian communities (members of the Maronites, Eastern Orthodox, Melkite, and other churches) and the Unitarian Druze led to the presence of mixed villages and towns in Mount Lebanon, Chouf, Wadi al-Taym, Jabal al-Druze, the Galilee region, Mount Carmel, and Golan Heights. The Maronite Catholic and the Druze founded modern Lebanon in the early Eighteenth Century, through a governing and social system known as the "Maronite-Druze dualism" in the Mount Lebanon Mutasarrifate.

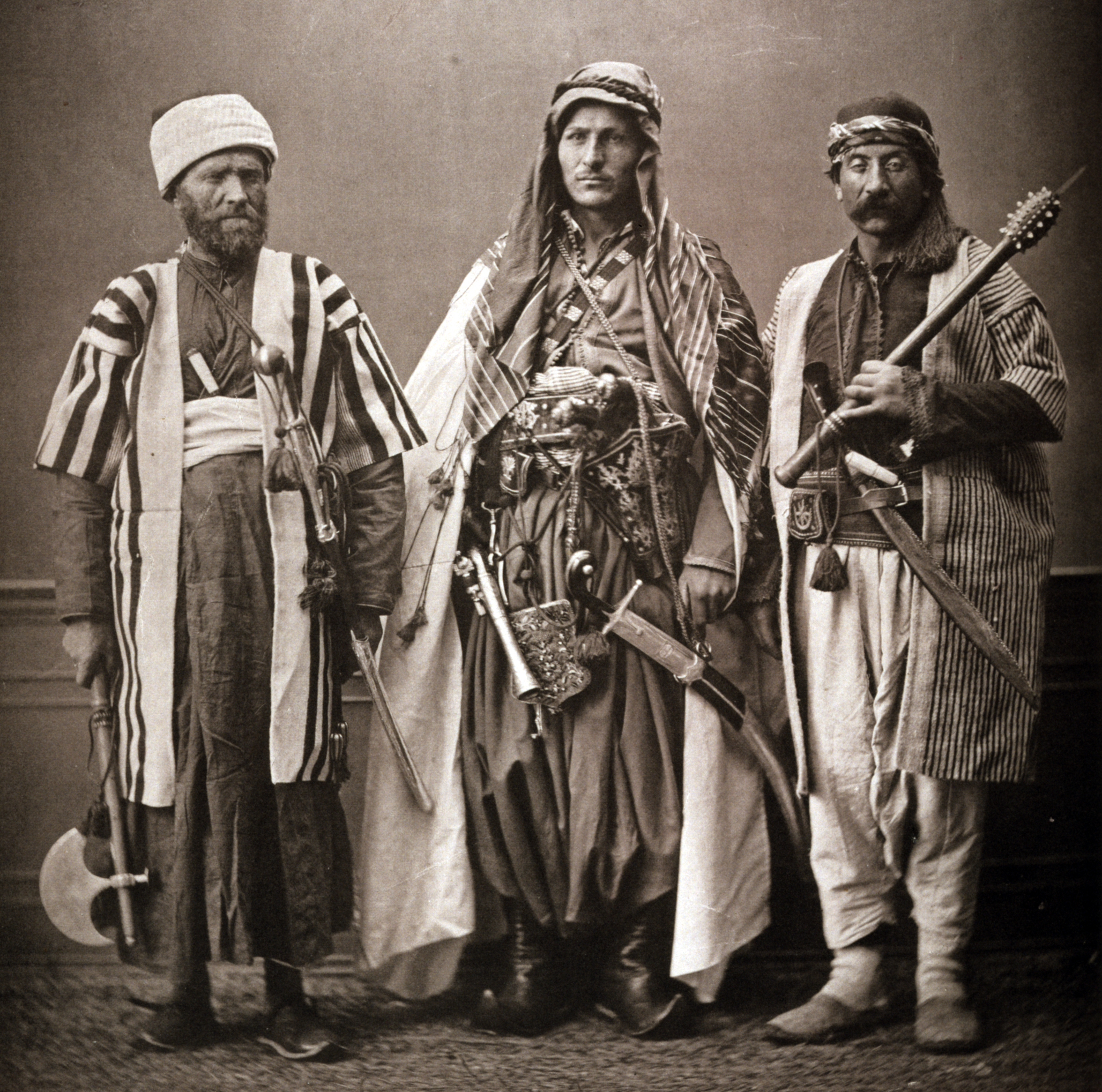
Left to right: Christian mountain dweller from Zahlé, Christian mountain dweller of Zgharta, and a Lebanese Druze man in traditional attire (1873).

Druze doctrine teaches that Christianity is to be "esteemed and praised" as the Gospel writers are regarded as "carriers of wisdom". The Druze faith incorporates some elements of Christianity, in addition to adoption of Christian elements on the Epistles of Wisdom. The full Druze canon or Druze scripture (Epistles of Wisdom) includes the Old Testament, the New Testament, the Quran and philosophical works by Plato and those influenced by Socrates among works from other religions and philosophers. The Druze faith shows influence of Christian monasticism, among other religious practices. Some scholars suggest that early Christian Gnostic beliefs might have influenced Druze theology, particularly in concepts of divine knowledge and reincarnation. These influences and incorporations of Christian elements encompass the adoption of the concept of Christianizing al-Mahdi's persona among the Druze, as well as the integration of verses from the Bible concerning the Messiah by certain Druze founders.

In terms of religious comparison, mainstream Christian denominations do not believe in reincarnation or the transmigration of the soul, unlike the Druze. Evangelism is widely seen as central to the Christian faith, unlike the Druze who do not accept converts. Marriage outside the Druze faith is rare and is strongly discouraged. Similarities between the Druze and Christians include commonalities in their view of monogamous marriage, as well as the forbidding of divorce and remarriage, in addition to the belief in the oneness of God and theophany.

Neither mainstream Christian denominations nor Druze require male circumcision, though male circumcision is commonly practiced in many predominantly Christian countries and many Christian communities, and it is practiced in Coptic Christianity, the Ethiopian Orthodox Church, and the Eritrean Orthodox Tewahedo Church as a rite of passage. Male circumcision is also widely practiced by the Druze, but as a cultural tradition, since circumcision has no religious significance in the Druze faith.

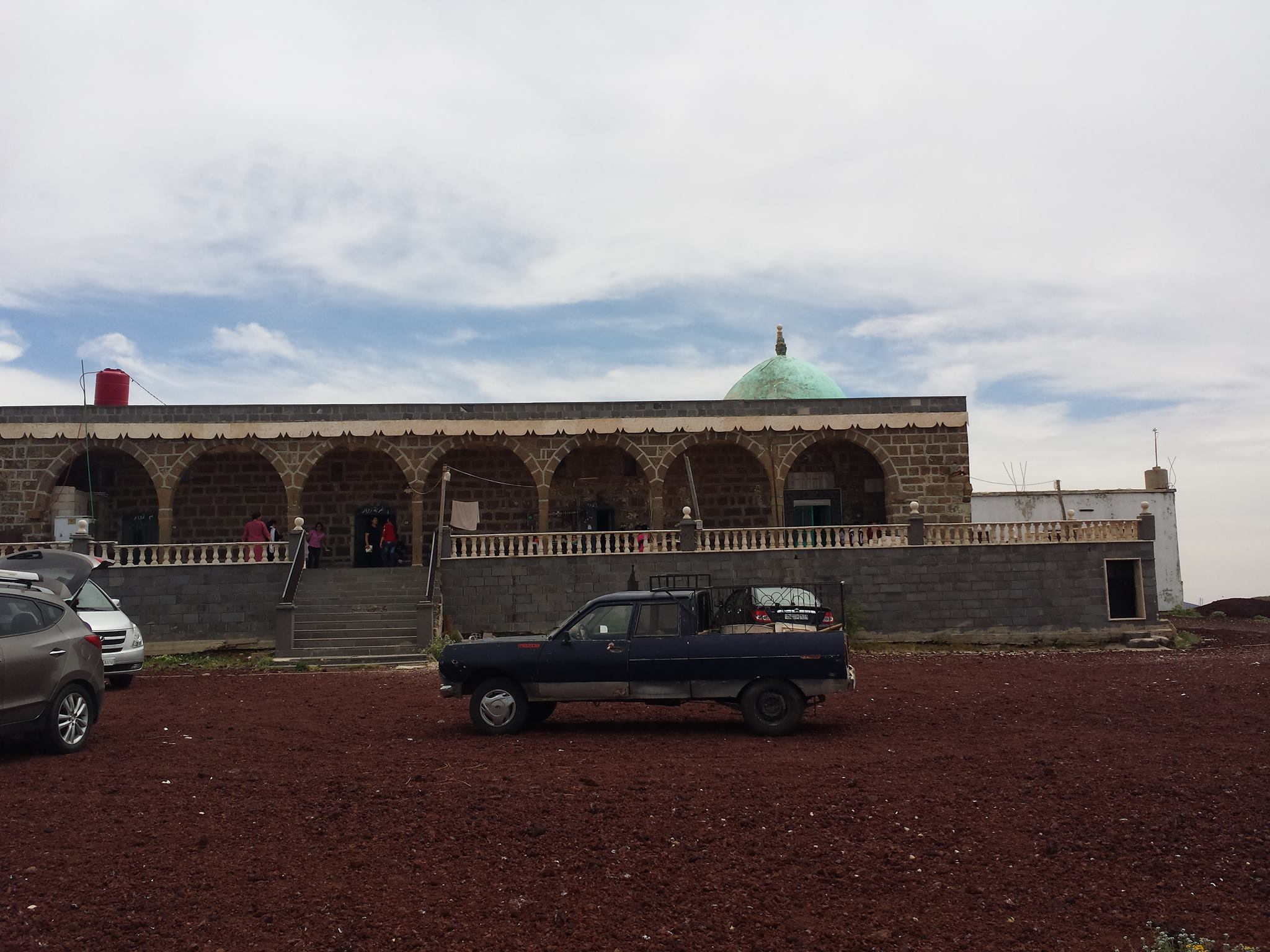
The Druze Maqam Al-Masih (Jesus) in Suwayda Governorate: Both religions revere Jesus.

Both faiths give a prominent place to Jesus: In Christianity, Jesus is the central figure, seen as the messiah. To the Druze, Jesus is an important prophet of God, being among the seven prophets (including Muhammad) who appeared in different periods of history. The Druze revere Jesus "the son of Joseph and Mary" and his four disciples, who wrote the Gospels. According to the Druze manuscripts Jesus is the Greatest Imam and the incarnation of Ultimate Reason (Akl) on earth and the first cosmic principle (Hadd), and regards Jesus and Hamza ibn Ali as the incarnations of one of the five great celestial powers, who form part of their system. In the Druze tradition, Jesus is known under three titles: the True Messiah (al-Masih al-Haq), the Messiah of all Nations (Masih al-Umam), and the Messiah of Sinners. This is due, respectively, to the belief that Jesus delivered the true Gospel message, the belief that he was the Saviour of all nations, and the belief that he offers forgiveness.

Both religions venerate the Virgin Mary, John the Baptist, Saint George, Elijah, Luke the Evangelist, Job and other common figures. Figures in the Old Testament such as Adam, Noah, Abraham, Moses, and Jethro are considered important prophets of God in the Druze faith, being among the seven prophets who appeared in different periods of history.

=== Relationship with Jews ===
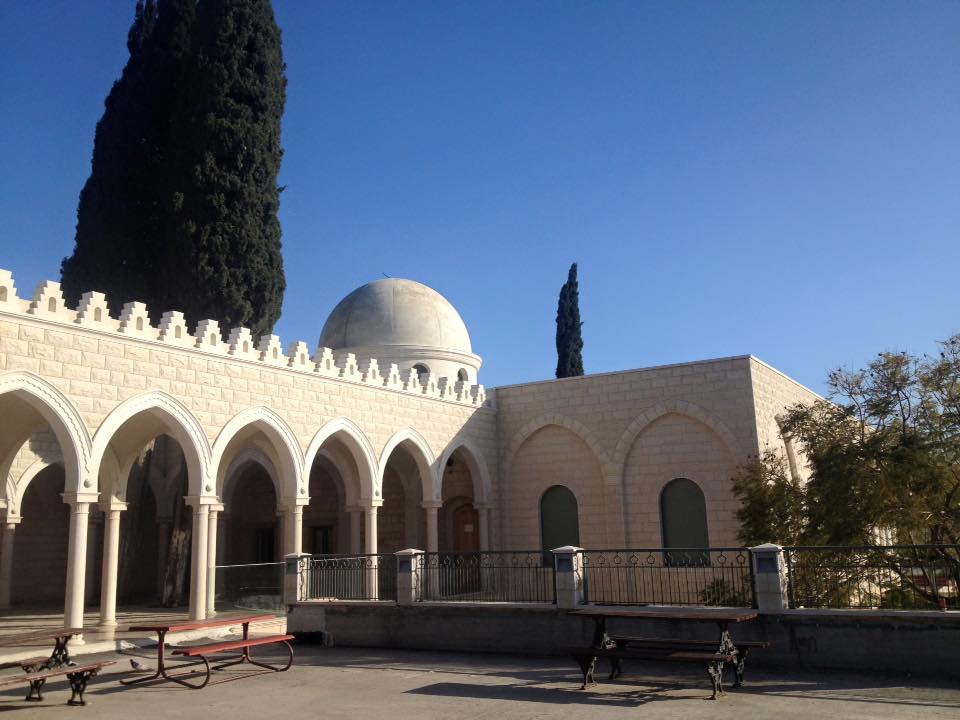
Maqam Al-Khidr in Kafr Yasif

The relationship between the Druze and Jews has been controversial, Antisemitic material is contained in the Druze literature such as the Epistles of Wisdom; for example in an epistle ascribed to one of the founders of Druze, Baha al-Din al-Muqtana, probably written sometime between AD 1027 and AD 1042, accused the Jews of crucifying Jesus. In other epistles, Jews are depicted negatively as "morally corrupt and murderers of prophets", particularly in chapters 13–14 of the Epistles of Wisdom. The epistle "Excuses and Warnings" predicts that, as a sign of the end times, Jews will seize control of Jerusalem and seek revenge on its inhabitants as well as those of Acre. Afterwards, Messiah Jesus will expel the Jews from Jerusalem due to their spread of moral corruption worldwide. Christians will then dominate Muslims until the Day of Judgment, when divine judgment by Al-Hakim bi-Amr Allah will occur.

The 12th‑century Jewish traveler Benjamin of Tudela noted that Jewish artisans and dyers traveled among the Druze for trade and that the Druze were favourably disposed toward Jews. The Druze communities in the mountainous regions of northern Israel, southeastern Syria, and Lebanon have historically maintained strong communal solidarity and often lived in relative separation from other religious and ethnic groups. The Deir el Qamar Synagogue was built in the 17th century during the Ottoman period to serve the local Jewish population, some members of whom were associated with the entourage of the Druze emir Fakhr‑al‑Din II.

During the Ottoman period, relations between the Druze of Galilee and the Jewish community were generally strained and marked by conflict. In 1660, during a Druze power struggle in Mount Lebanon, Druze forces destroyed Jewish settlements in the Galilee, including Safad and Tiberias. The tension escalated in 1834 during the Peasants' Revolt, when Safed's Jewish community endured a month-long assault that involved extensive looting, violence, and the destruction of Jewish properties by both Druze and Muslims. During the Druze revolt against the rule of Ibrahim Pasha of Egypt, the Jewish community in Safad was attacked by Druze rebels in early July 1838, the violence against the Jews included plundering their homes and desecrating their synagogues.

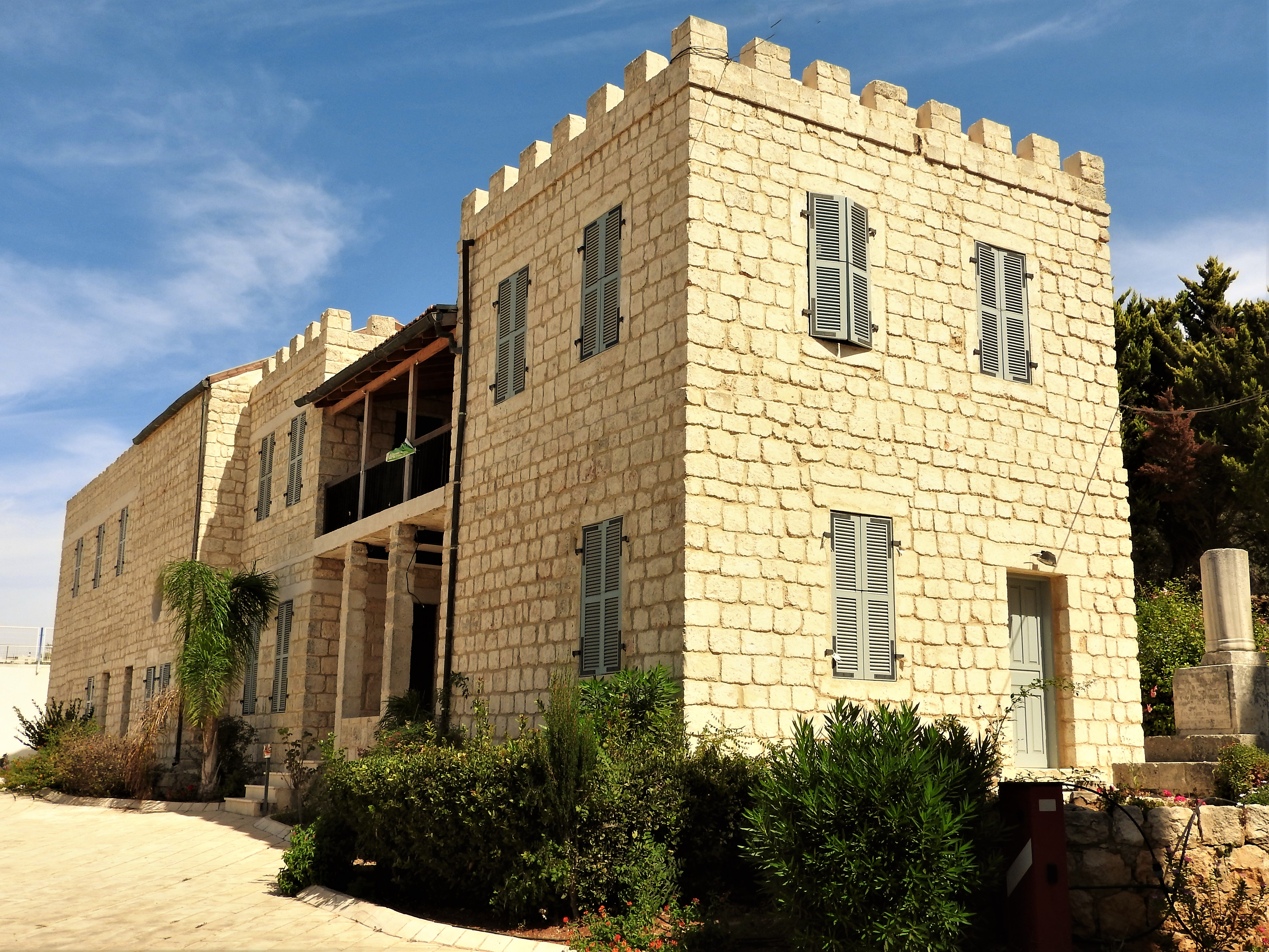
Oliphant house in Daliyat al-Karmel

Interactions between Jews and Druze were rare before the establishment of Israel in 1948, as they historically lived isolated from each other. During the British Mandate for Palestine, the Druze did not embrace the rising Arab nationalism of the time or participate in violent confrontations with Jewish immigrants. In 1948, many Druze volunteered for the Israeli army and no Druze villages were destroyed or permanently abandoned. Since the establishment of the state of Israel, the Druze have demonstrated solidarity with Israel and distanced themselves from Arab Islamic radicalism. Israeli Druze male citizens serve in the Israel Defense Forces. The Jewish-Druze partnership was often referred as "a covenant of blood" (Hebrew: ברית דמים, brit damim) in recognition of the common military yoke carried by the two peoples for the security of the country. Israeli Druze scholars Kais M. Firro and Rabah Halabi contend that the Israeli narrative of a "special historical bond" or "blood pact" between Druze and Jews is a myth fabricated by early Zionist circles to divide and control Arab religious communities in Israel, with no historical foundation. Conversely, the Druze community in Syria, Lebanon, and the Golan Heights generally aligns with Arab nationalism and holds predominantly anti-Zionist views.

From 1957, the Israeli government formally recognized the Druze as a separate religious community, and they are defined as a distinct ethnic group in the Israeli Ministry of Interior's census registration. Israeli Druze do not consider themselves Muslim, and see their faith as a separate and independent religion. While compared to other Israeli Christians and Muslims, Druze place less emphasis on their Arab identity and self-identify more as Israeli. However, they were less ready for personal relationships with Jews compared to Israeli Muslims and Christians. Scholars attribute this trend to cultural differences between Jews and Druze.

In terms of religious comparison, scholars consider Judaism and the Druze faith as ethnoreligious groups, both practicing endogamy, and both typically do not proselytize. Belief in reincarnation (Gilgul) exist in some strands of Judaism influenced by the Kabbalah, such as Hasidic Judaism, but is rejected by mainstream Jewish denominations (Reform Judaism, Conservative Judaism and Orthodox Judaism). Figures in the Hebrew Bible such as Adam, Noah, Abraham, and Moses are considered important prophets of God in the Druze faith, being among the seven prophets who appeared in different periods of history. Both religions venerate Elijah, Job and other common figures. In the Hebrew Bible, Jethro was Moses' father-in-law, a Kenite shepherd and priest of Midian. Jethro of Midian is considered an ancestor of the Druze who revere him as their spiritual founder and chief prophet.

== Origins ==
=== Ethnic origins ===
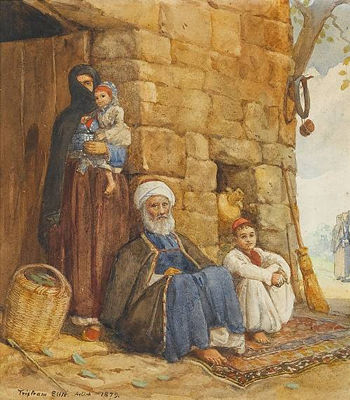
A Druze family of the Lebanon, late 1800s

A study carried out by the Israeli Druze historian Kais M. Firro examines various theories about the origins of the Druze, including possible connections to the Arameans, Arabs, Itureans, Cuthites, Hivites, Armenians, Persians, and Turks. Some suggested a European origin. In the 17th century, there was a prevailing belief in France that the Druze were descendants of a lost army of European Christian crusaders. According to this notion, after the fall of the Christian stronghold of Acre in 1291 and the subsequent persecution by the victorious Mamluks, these crusaders sought refuge in the mountains of Lebanon and settled there permanently.

According to Firro, two main approaches have been used to trace Druze origins. The first examines religious texts and the ethnic backgrounds of the early Druze leaders. The second focuses on the migration and settlement patterns of ancient peoples and tribes in the Druze regions before the 11th century. The third approach relies on anthropometric studies.

The main proponent of the first approach is historian Philip Hitti, whose theory is a key reference for tracing Druze origins. Hitti proposed that the Druze are a blend of Persians, Iraqis, and Persianized Arabs who adopted new beliefs. He supported this with three arguments: first, the early founders and disseminators of the Druze religion were of Persians origin; second, some of the Druze religious lexicon is Persian; and third, the native inhabitants of Wadi al-Taym where Druze faith beliefs first spread, were influenced by Persian and Iraqi or Persianized Arab cultures before 1077. However, Martin Sprengling criticized Hitti's theory, arguing that not all early Druze leaders were of Persian origin—citing Baha al-Din al-Muqtana as an example of Arab origin. Sprengling also noted that Wadi al-Taym's inhabitants before 1077 were mostly pure Arab tribes such as the Tanukhids and Taym Allah tribe. He concluded that the Druze are mainly a combination of various ethnic groups, with a major influence from Arabs, particularly southern Arabs, along with an indigenous mountain population of Aramaic origin. Additionally, Two English researchers, Gertrude Bell and David Hogarth, also proposed that the Druze are a blend of Arabs from Southern Arabia and the mountain-dwelling Aramaeans.

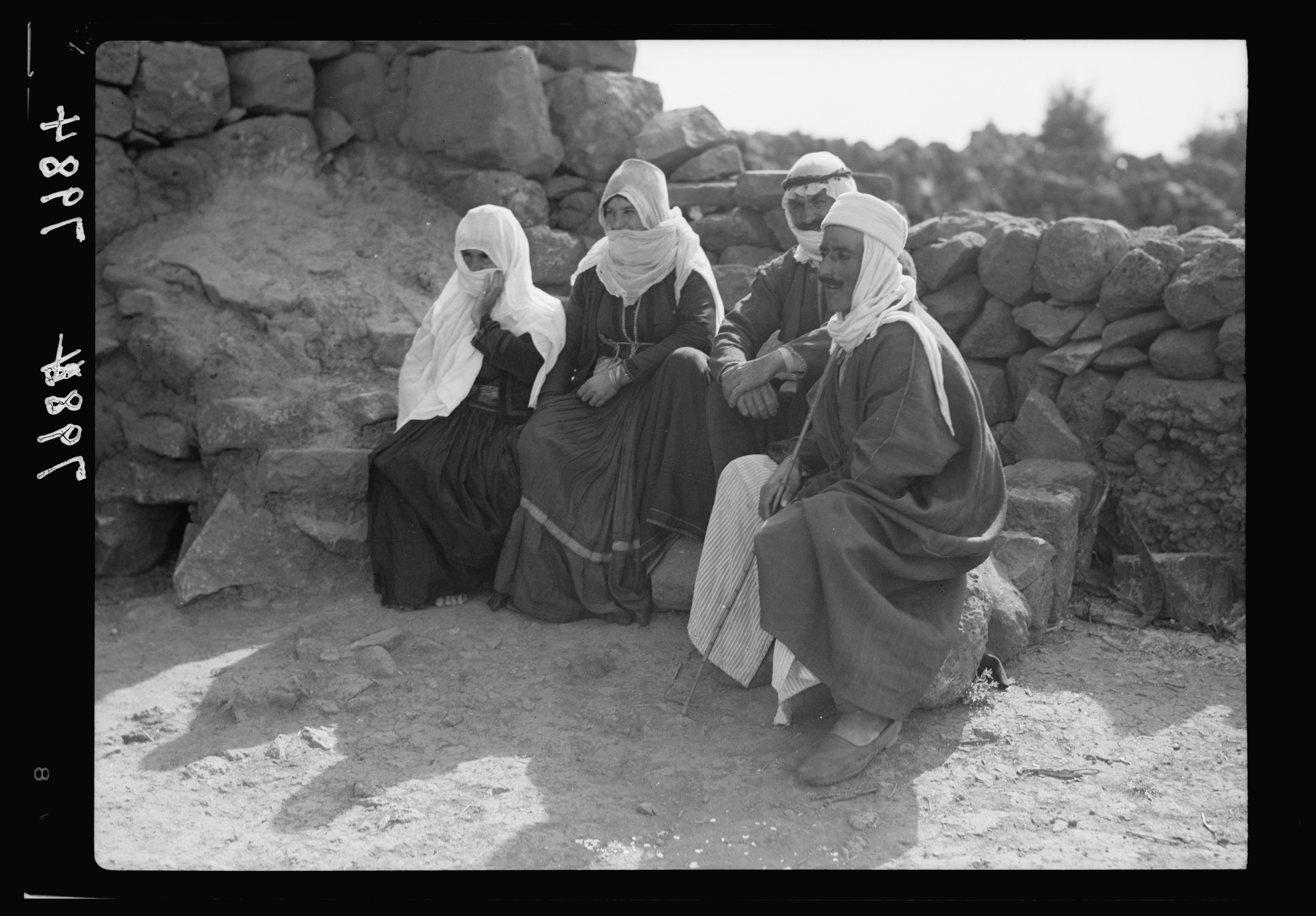
A photograph from 1938 depicting Druze people from Kanawat in Jabal Druze (Hauran), dressed in their traditional clothing

The second approach, used by Druze historians, scholars, intellectuals and clerics, emphasizes the migration and settlement of Arab tribes to highlight the pure Arab lineage of those who adopted Druze beliefs in the 11th century. Proponents argue that the Druze speak a "pure Arab dialect" and are of "pure Arab blood", not mixed with Turkish or other influences, due to their practice of strict endogamy marriage. This view maintains that most Druze are descended from 12 Arab tribes that migrated to Syria before the Islamic period. It relies on historical records, Druze chronicles, and genealogical trees reconstructed by Druze families to trace their ancestry and settlement in Syria. According to Firro, all Druze historians, scholars and leaders in Lebanon and Syria consider the Druze to be Arabs, and this view is accepted by the entire Druze community in those countries. In contrast, while most Druze in Israel consider themselves Arabs, some Israeli Druze politicians have begun to reject the idea of Arabic racial origin as a component of Druze national identity for political reasons.

According to Firro, the third approach in the research on Druze origins is based on the conclusions of researchers and anthropologists. Studies by Felix von Luschan, Arries and Kappers found that Druze in the Levant, along with their Muslim and Christian counterparts, share the same origins. Similarly, Druze historian Nejla Abu-Izzedin has concluded that Druze, Christians, and Muslims in the Levant have the same racial background.

According to Druze historian Amin Talea', Druze oral and written traditions recount that twelve Arab tribes converted to Islam and fought alongside Muslim warriors until they were introduced to the Druze religion by preachers sent from Egypt by the Fatimid caliph Al-Hakim bi-Amr Allah. Talea' adds that, over time, the Druze developed a strong sense of their pure Arab origins, believing that, apart from their unique religious practices, their spiritual and material culture closely mirrored that of the broader population of Greater Syria.

==== Arabian hypothesis ====
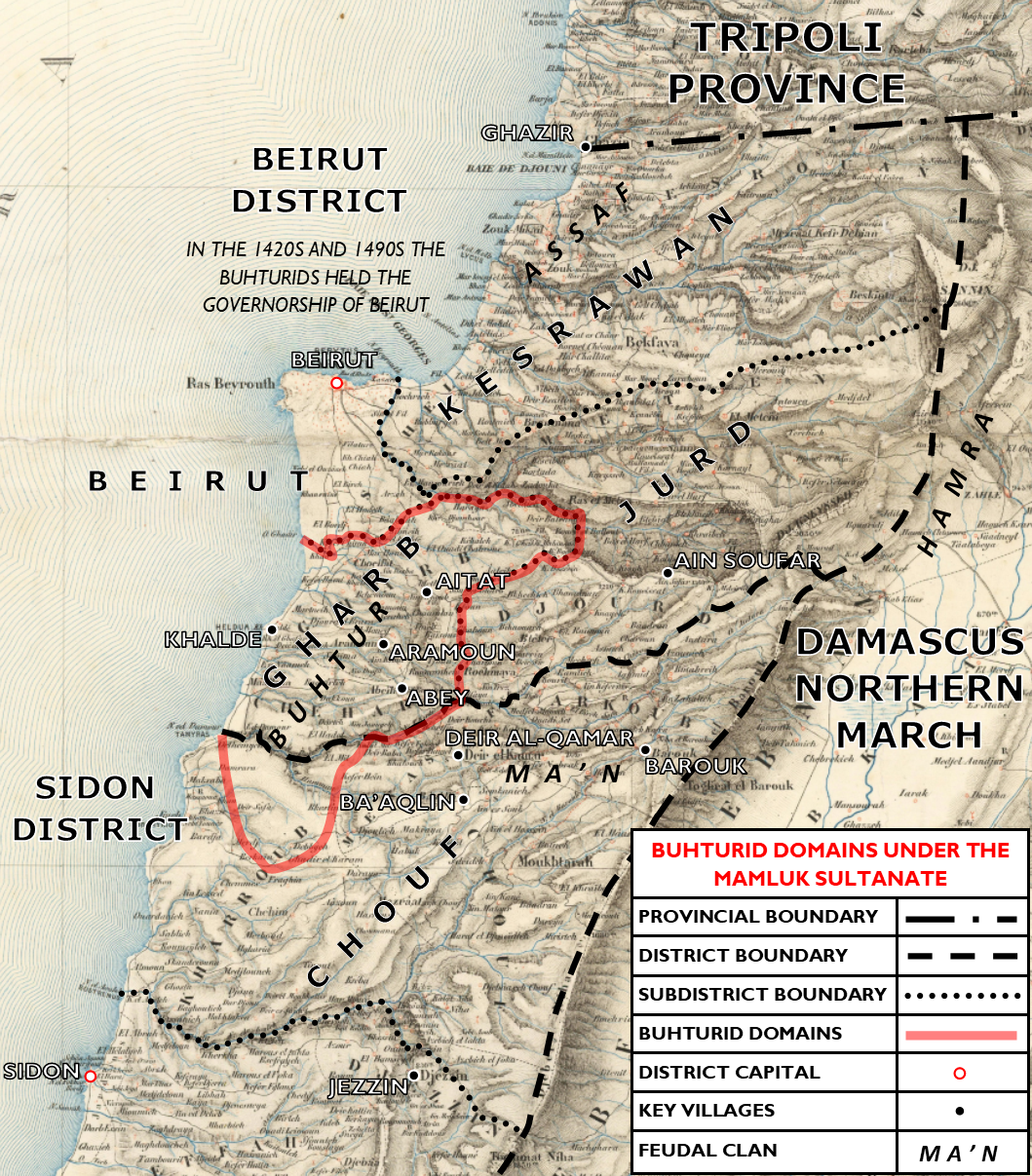
Map of the Buhturid domains in Mount Lebanon under Mamluk rule, with the Buhturids, a Tanukh clan, holding a significant place in Druze history.

The Druze faith extended to many areas in the Middle East, but most of the modern Druze can trace their origin to the Wadi al-Taym in Southern Lebanon, which is named after an Arab tribe Taym Allah (or Taym Allat) which, according to Islamic historian al-Tabari, first came from the Arabian Peninsula into the valley of the Euphrates where they had been Christianized prior to their migration into Lebanon. Many of the Druze feudal families, whose genealogies have been preserved by the two modern Syrian chroniclers Haydar al-Shihabi and Ahmad Faris al-Shidyaq, seem also to point in the direction of this origin. Arabian tribes emigrated via the Persian Gulf and stopped in Iraq on their route that would later to lead them to Syria. The first feudal Druze family, the Tanukhids, which made for itself a name in fighting the Crusaders was, according to Haydar al-Shihabi, an Arab tribe from Mesopotamia where it occupied the position of a ruling family and apparently was Christianized.

Travelers like Niebuhr, and scholars like Max von Oppenheim, undoubtedly echoing the popular Druze belief regarding their own origin, have classified them as Arabs.

The Arabian hypothesis is widely regarded as the leading explanation for the origins of the Druze people among historians, scholars, intellectuals, and religious leaders within the Druze community. This theory suggests that the Druze descended from twelve Arab tribes that migrated to Syria before and during the early Islamic period. It also serves as the primary framework for understanding their historical and racial origins, as reflected in their oral traditions and written literature. This hypothesis is central to the Druze's self-perception and cultural identity. This view is accepted by the entire Druze community in Syria and Lebanon, as well as by most Druze in Israel. The Arabic language is spoken by the Druze and is also the language in which their sacred texts are written. Scholars who hold this view argue that this linguistic connection underscores the Druze's ethnic Arab identity.

According to Druze historian Nejla Abu-Izzedin, the Druze people are of Arab origin, both culturally and historically. She explains that Druze traditions and narratives consistently trace their roots to Arab tribes who settled in Syria, some prior to the advent of Islam and others during the Muslim conquest. Abu-Izzedin further notes that when the Druze community was established, its members were spread across a wide area of Syria. The majority of those who embraced the Druze faith were Arab tribes from the northern region, making the Arab elements of the community predominant. According to Abu-Izzedin, "ethnically", the "Wadi al-Taym has been authoritatively stated to be one of the most Arab regions of [geographical] Syria". The area was one of the two most important centers of Druze missionary activity in the 11th century.

Additionally, Abu-Izzedin highlights that the Tanukhids, an Arab tribe, hold a significant place in Druze history. She asserts that the Druze claims of Arab origin were not driven by self-interest, as Arabs were no longer in a dominant position when the Druze community was founded in the 11th century. Furthermore, Druze narratives recount their involvement in pivotal events in Arab history. In modern times, the Druze have largely adopted Arab nationalism and played a notable role in the Great Syrian Revolt of 1920's.

Druze scholar Sami Makarem notes that Wadi Taym and southern Lebanon (Jabal Amel) were pivotal centers for Druze missionary activity in the 11th century, inhabited by Arab tribes. He explains that Druze oral traditions and religious documents suggest that most Druze ancestors came from twelve Arab tribes in Maarat al-Numan during the early period of Islam and its conquests. Later, they migrated and settled in Lebanon. Makarem highlights the Druze's strong Arab heritage, noting that early Druze followers were predominantly of Arab descent. He also points out that many tribes settling in the Levant before Islam came from southern Arabia, including Yamani and Qaysi tribes. According to Makarem, Druze belief links their ancestry to tribes that lived in [geographical] Syria, some before Islam and others arriving during the conquest.

Israeli Druze historian Salman Hamud Fallah asserted that the Druze people of today originated from the Arabian Peninsula. He noted that some of their ancestors came from the northern part of the peninsula, while others came from the southern region, specifically Yemen. In addition, Israeli Druze historian Yusri Hazran describes the Druze narrative, which holds that twelve Arab tribes migrated into the Syrian region either before the rise of Islam or during the early Islamic period. These tribes were predominantly of Yamani tribes, with the Tanukhids being the most dominant among them. Subsequently, these tribes adopted the Druze doctrine. Hazran affirms that this narrative is recognized within Druze doctrine and its scriptures.

Druze researchers and historians from Israel, such as Kais M. Firro, Rabah Halabi, Munir Fakhr El-Din, and Afifa E. Kheir, confirm that the Druze are Arabs and note that this was not a contentious issue in Israel before 1962. Halabi observes that Israeli policies aimed at granting the Druze a distinct community status and political identity led some Druze to see this separate "Druze-Israeli identity" as an ethnic marker for social integration within Israeli society. Firro argues that efforts to create a separate Druze identity distinct from Arabs are politically motivated and lack historical basis, citing Druze religious and historical literature that affirms their Arab heritage. Scholar Michael Cohen adds that, despite the Israeli and Zionist narrative promoting a distinct "Druze ethnic identity", most Druze in Israel view their origins as Arab and consider their Druze identity primarily as religious.

==== Druze as a mixture of Western Asian tribes ====
The 1911 edition of Encyclopædia Britannica states that the Druze are "a mixture of refugee stocks, in which the Arab largely predominates, grafted on to an original mountain population of Aramaic blood".

==== Iturean hypothesis ====
According to Jewish contemporary literature, the Druze, who were visited and described in 1165 by Benjamin of Tudela, were pictured as descendants of the Itureans, an Ismaelite Arab tribe, which used to reside in the northern parts of the Golan plateau through Hellenistic and Roman periods. The word Druzes, in an early Hebrew edition of his travels, occurs as Dogziyin, but it is clear that this is a scribal error.

Archaeological assessments of the Druze region have also proposed the possibility of Druze descending from Itureans, who had inhabited Mount Lebanon and Golan Heights in late classic antiquity, but their traces fade in the Middle Ages.

=== Genetics ===
Lebanese Christians and Druze became a genetic isolate in the predominantly Islamic world.

In a 2005 study of ASPM gene variants, Mekel-Bobrov et al. found that the Israeli Druze people of the Mount Carmel region have among the highest rate of the newly evolved ASPM- Haplogroup D, at 52.2% occurrence of the approximately 6,000-year-old allele. While it is not yet known exactly what selective advantage is provided by this gene variant, the Haplogroup D allele is thought to be positively selected in populations and to confer some substantial advantage that has caused its frequency to rapidly increase.

A 2004 DNA study has shown that Israeli Druze are remarkable for the high frequency (35%) of males who carry the Y-chromosomal haplogroup L, which is otherwise uncommon in the Middle East (Shen et al. 2004). This haplogroup originates from prehistoric South Asia and has spread from Pakistan into southern Iran. A 2008 study done on larger samples showed that L-M20 averages 27% in Mount Carmel Druze, 2% in Galilee Druze, 8% in Lebanese Druze, and it was not found in a sample of 59 Syrian Druze (Slush et al. 2008).

Cruciani, in 2007, found E1b1b1a2 (E-V13) [a subclade of E1b1b1a (E-M78)] in high levels (>10% of the male population) in Cypriot and Druze lineages. Recent genetic clustering analyses of ethnic groups are consistent with the close ancestral relationship between the Druze and Cypriots, and also identified similarity to the general Syrian and Lebanese populations, as well as the major Jewish divisions (Ashkenazi, Sephardi, Iraqi, and Moroccan Jews) (Behar et al. 2010).

Also, a new study concluded that the Druze harbor a remarkable diversity of mitochondrial DNA lineages that appear to have separated from each other thousands of years ago. But instead of dispersing throughout the world after their separation, the full range of lineages can still be found within the Druze population.

The researchers noted that the Druze villages contained a striking range of high frequency and high diversity of the X haplogroup, suggesting that this population provides a glimpse into the past genetic landscape of the Near East at a time when the X haplogroup was more prevalent.

These findings are consistent with the Druze oral tradition that claims that the adherents of the faith came from diverse ancestral lineages stretching back tens of thousands of years. The Shroud of Turin analysis shows significant traces of mitochondrial DNA unique to the Druze community.

A 2008 study published on the genetic background of Druze communities in Israel showed highly heterogeneous parental origins. A total of 311 Israeli Druze were sampled: 37 from the Golan Heights, 183 from the Galilee, and 35 from Mount Carmel, as well as 27 Druze immigrants from Syria and 29 from Lebanon (Slush et al. 2008). The researchers found the following frequencies of Y-chromosomal and MtDNA haplogroups:

- Mount Carmel: L 27%, R 27%, J 18%, E 15%, G 12%.
- Galilee: J 31%, R 20%, E 18%, G 14%, K 11%, Q 4%, L 2%.
- Golan Heights: J 54%, E 29%, I 8%, G 4%, C 4%.
- Lebanon: J 58%, K 17%, Q 8%, R 8%, L 8%.
- Syria: J 39%, E 29%, R 14%, G 14%, K 4%.
- Maternal MtDNA haplogroup frequencies: H 32%, X 13%, K 12.5%, U 10%, T 7.5%, HV 4.8%, J 4.8%, I 3.5%, pre HV 3%, L2a3 2.25%, N1b 2.25%, M1 1.6%, W 1.29%.

In a principal component analysis of a 2014 study, Druze were located between Lebanese people and Mizrahi Jews.

According to a 2015 study, Druze have a largely similar genome with Middle Eastern Arabs, but they have not married outside of their clans in 1000 years and Druze families from different regions share a similarity with each other that distinguishes them from other Middle Eastern populations.

A 2016 study based on testing samples of Druze in the historic region of Syria, in comparison with ancient humans (including Anatolian and Armenian), and on Geographic Population Structure (GPS) tool by converting genetic distances into geographic distances, concluded that Druze might hail from the Zagros Mountains and the surroundings of Lake Van in eastern Anatolia, then they later migrated south to settle in the mountainous regions in Syria, Lebanon and Israel.

A 2020 study on remains from Canaanaite (Bronze Age southern Levantine) populations suggests a significant degree of genetic continuity in currently Arabic-speaking Levantine populations (including the Druze, Lebanese, Palestinians, and Syrians), as well as in most Jewish groups (including Sephardi Jews, Ashkenazi Jews, Mizrahi Jews, and Maghrebi Jews) from the populations of the Bronze Age Levant, suggesting that the aforementioned groups all derive more than half of their overall ancestry (atDNA) from Canaanite / Bronze Age Levantine populations, albeit with varying sources and degrees of admixture from differing host or invading populations depending on each group.

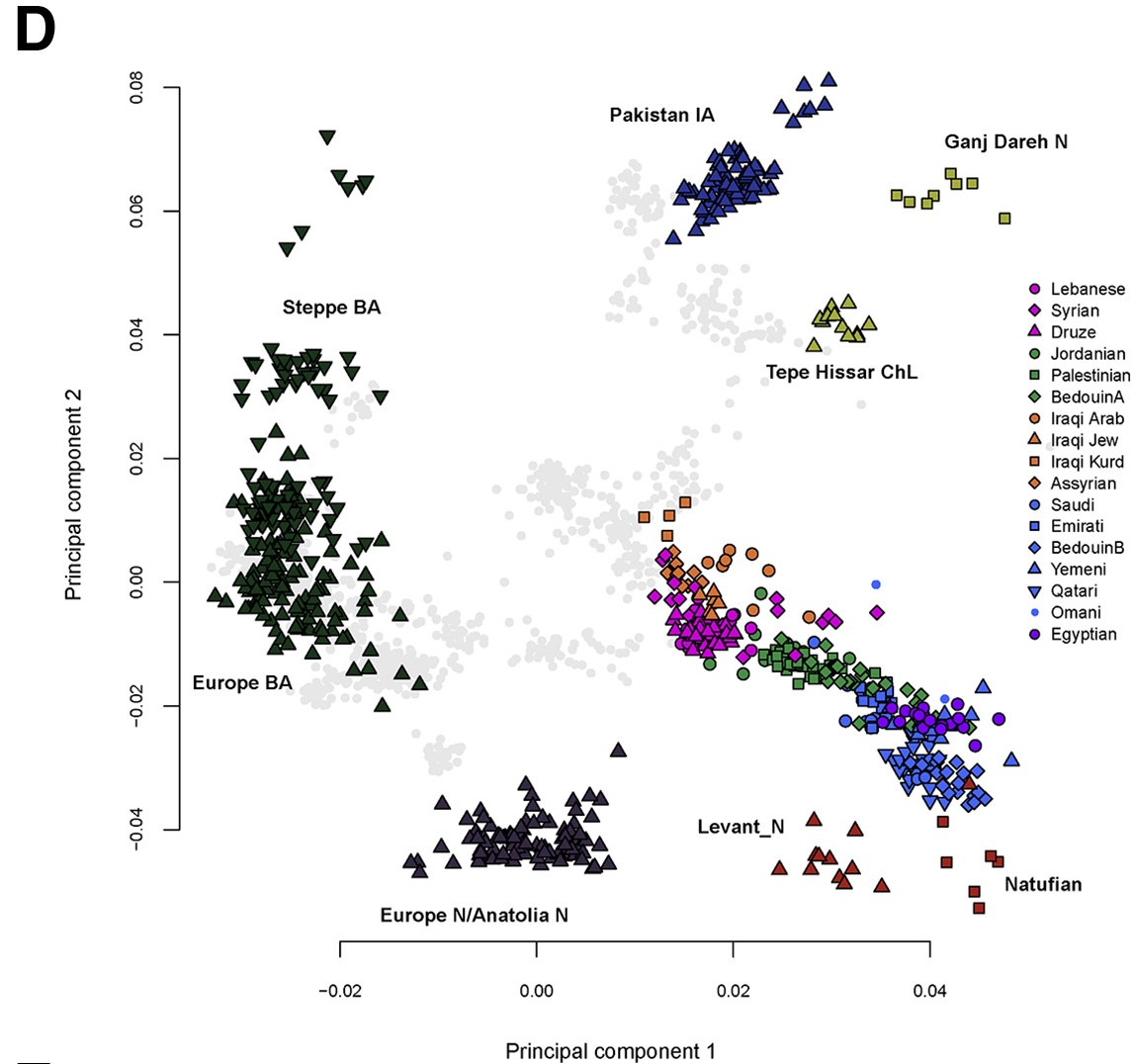
Principal component analysis of some ancient and modern populations, including Druze (Almarri, Mohamed A. et al. 2021).

In a 2021 study, Druze were a part of the larger Levant-Iraq cluster in a fineSTRUCTURE tree analysis, and overlapped with Lebanese people in a principal component analysis.

== See also ==
- Sword Battalion
- Jaysh al-Muwahhidin
- Jabal Druze State
- List of Druze
- Gnosticism and Neoplatonism
- Religious syncretism
- Christianity and Druze
