= Arslan =

Male given name

- Gender: Male

Origin
- Origin: Turkic
- Meaning: lion, absolute fearless, fearless warrior, brave
- Region of origin: West Asia, Central Asia, South Asia

Other names
- Related names: Арслан, Aslan, Arıslan, Arislan, Arǝslan, Arsalan, Aryslan, Azlan, Арыслан, Арыстан, Eruslan, Uruslan, Iruslan, Oroszlán, Ruslan, Roeslan, ارسلان, Ρουσλάν, რუსლან, Asllani

Arslan is a Turkic masculine given name and surname, used mainly in West Asia, Central Asia. It means lion and has secondary meanings like brave or fearless. Arıslan and Aslan and Arsalan are variants of the name. This name is derived from Old Turkic and was used as an epithet for Turkish emperors in the Middle Ages.

== People ==
=== Given name ===
- Arslan Aydemirov (born 1977), Russian footballer
- Arslan Asad Butt (born 1992), Pakistani actor
- Arslan Ekşi (born 1985), Turkish volleyball player
- Arslan Giray (1692–1768), khan of the Crimean khanate
- Arslan Khalimbekov (born 1967), Russian football manager and former player
- Arslan Khan (disambiguation), multiple people
- Arslan Mataraci Pasha (died 1704), Ottoman governor
- Arslan Mehmed Pasha (Bosnia) (1745–1812), governor of the Ottoman Province of Bosnia
- Arslan Qadir (born 1994), Pakistani field hockey player
- Arslan Seyhanlı (born 1960), Turkish wrestler
- Arslan Toğuz (1886–1963), police commissioner of the Ottoman Empire, Turkish militia leader and politician
- Uğur Arslan Kuru (born 1986), Turkish footballer
- Didem Arslan Yılmaz (born 1974), Turkish news anchor and TV presenter

=== Surname ===
- Adil Arslan (1880–1954), Ottoman politician, writer and poet from Syria
- Ahmet Arslan (disambiguation), multiple people, including:
  - Ahmet Arslan (politician) (born 1962), Turkish politician
- Alparslan Arslan (1977–2023), Turkish criminal
- Antonia Arslan (born 1938), Italian writer of Armenian origin
- Aybüke Arslan (born 1994), Turkish women's footballer
- Berkin Kamil Arslan (born 1992), Turkish footballer
- Buse Arslan (born 1992), Turkish actress
- Cengiz Arslan (born 1996), Turkish Greco-Roman wrestler
- Cihat Arslan (born 1970), Turkish footballer and manager
- Emin Arslan (1868–1943), Ottoman civil servant and Lebanese writer
- Emine Arslan (born 1989), Turkish female kickboxer
- Ender Arslan (born 1983), Turkish basketball player
- Ensar Arslan (born 2001), German footballer
- Ertuğrul Arslan (born 1980), Turkish footballer
- Faysal Arslan (1941–2009), Lebanese politician
- Firat Arslan (born 1970), German professional boxer of Turkish origin
- Gülcan Arslan (born 1986), Turkish actress
- Hakan Arslan (born 1988), Turkish footballer
- Hakan Arslan (footballer, born 1989) (born 1989), Turkish footballer
- Halime Tuana Arslan (born 2005), Turkish handball player
- Hamit Arslan (1894–?), Turkish footballer
- Huseyin Arslan, American engineer
- Ilke Arslan, Turkish American microscopist
- Işık Kaan Arslan (born 2001), Turkish footballer
- İhsan Arslan (born 1948), Turkish politician and businessman of Kurdish origin
- Kadir Arslan (born 1977), Turkish volleyball player
- Kamber Arslan (born 1980), Turkish footballer
- Kanbolat Görkem Arslan (1980–2026), Turkish actor
- Koray Arslan (born 1983), Turkish footballer
- M Iqbal Arslan, Bangladeshi physician and academic
- Majid Arslan (1908–1983), Lebanese politician
- May Arslan (1928–2013), member of the Lebanese Arslan family
- Murat Arslan (born 1974), Turkish judge
- Murat Aslan (born 1986), Turkish volleyball player
- Mücahit Arslan, Turkish politician
- Nadia Arslan (1949–2008), Lebanese actress
- Namosh E. Arslan (born 1981), German singer, musician, performance artist, actor and DJ
- Osman Arslan (born 1942), Turkish judge
- Ömer Arslan (born 1993), Turkish footballer
- Qutlu Arslan, 12th-century Georgian politician and statesman
- Rahmi Arslan (1874–1947), Ottoman revolutionary
- Shakib Arslan, (1869–1946), Lebanese politician, writer, poet, historian
- Sibel Arslan (born 1980), Swiss-Turkish politician and lawyer
- Talal Arslan (born 1963), Lebanese politician
- Thomas Arslan (born 1970), German-Turkish film director
- Tolgay Arslan (born 1990), German-Turkish footballer
- Volkan Arslan (born 1978), Turkish footballer
- Yasemin Can Arslan (born 1992), Turkish long-distance runner
- Yasin Arslan (born 1978), Turkish weightlifter
- Yiğit Arslan (born 1996), Turkish basketball player
- Yılmaz Arslan (born 1968), German film director of Kurdish origin
- Yunus Emre Arslan, Turkish archer
- Zeina Talal Arslan (born 1971), Lebanese social activist
- Zühtü Arslan (born 1964), Turkish judge and current President of the Constitutional Court of Turkey

=== Title or epithet ===
- Bazir Arslan Khan, Khagan of Karakhanids
- Ali Arslan Khan (died 998), Karakhanid ruler
- Arslan Isra'il (died 1032), Turkish chieftain
- Alp Arslan (1029-1072), Sultan of the Seljuk Empire
- Alp Arslan al-Akhras (died 1114), Seljuk sultan of Aleppo
- Ali ibn Il-Arslan, Turkish statesmen in the Ghaznavid empire
- Togan Arslan (died 1137), Bey of Dilmaç
- Alp Arslan ibn Mahmud (died 1146), ruler of Mosul
- Il-Arslan (died 1172), Kharazm Shah
- Alp Arslan (1029–1072), second sultan of the Seljuk dynasty
- Khadija Arslan Khatun, Seljuk princess
- Arslan ibn Mas'ud (1092–1118), Sultan of the Ghaznavid Empire
- Arslan Khan (prince), Prince of the Karluks
- Arslan Shah I (died 1142), Sultan of Kerman
- Kara Arslan (died 1174), member of the Artuqid dynasty
- Qizil Arslan (died 1191), ) Atabeg of the Eldiguzids
- Kilij Arslan I (1079–1107), Sultan of Seljuk Sultanate of Rûm, first sultan in Konya
- Kilij Arslan II (died 1192), Sultan of Seljuk Sultanate of Rûm
- Kilij Arslan III (died 1205), Sultan of Seljuk Sultanate of Rûm
- Kilij Arslan IV (died 1265), Sultan of Seljuk Sultanate of Rûm
- Al-Nasir Kilij Arslan (died 1229), Emir of Hama
- Nur al-Din Arslan Shah I (died 1211), Zengid Emir of Mossul
- Melik Arslan Bey (died 1466), seventh bey of the Beylik of Dulkadir

== See also ==
- Aslan (disambiguation)
- Arslanović
- Ruslan (given name)

== Sources ==
- Баландин А. И., Гацак В. М. (1977). Фольклор: Поэтическая система: [Сборник статей]. М.: Наука. p. 343.
- Баскаков Н. А. (1979). Русские фамилии тюркского происхождения. М.: Наука. p. 279.
- Кусимова Т. (1991). В мире имён. Словарь башкирских имён. Уфа: Башкирское книжное издательство. p. 192. ISBN 5-295-00565-8.
- Надель-Червинская М., Червинский П. (2013). Энциклопедический мир Владимира Даля. Книга вторая (в 2-х томах): Дикие звери. Vol. 2. Часть первая (2-е изд ed.). Тернополь: Крок. p. 396. ISBN 978-617-692-069-4.
- Никонов В. А. (1988). Ищем имя. М.: Советская Россия. p. 128.
- Сводный словарь личных имен народов Северного Кавказа. М.: ФЛИНТА, Наука. 2012. p. 584.
- Тумашева Д. Г. (1984). Татарский язык: лексическая и грамматическая семантика. Казань: Издательство Казанского университета. p. 95.
- Шумовский Т. А. (2004). Странствия слов. СПб.: Протей. p. 336. ISBN 5-94844-008-7.
- Петровский Н. А. (1966). Словарь русских личных имён. Москва: Советская энциклопедия.
- Саттаров Г.Ф. (Гумар Саттар - Мулилле) (1998). "Татар исемнәре ни сөйли?" "О чем говорят татарские имена?". Полный толковый словарь татарских личных имен. Казань: Редакционно-издательское объединение "РАННУР". p. 486. ISBN 5-900049-03-5.
- Саттаров Г.Ф. (1989). "Исемең матур, кемнәр куйган?". Казан: Татарстан китап нәшрияты. p. 256. ISBN 5-298-00243-9.
- Н. С. Тихонравов (1859). Летописи русской литературы т. II, отд. II. Москва.
