= Aslan (name) =

Aslan is a Turkish surname and given name literally meaning "lion". Variants: Arslan, Arsalan. Notable people with the surname include:

== People ==
=== Given name ===
- Aslan Abashidze (born 1938), former leader of Adjara
- Aslan Atem (born 1991), Turkish wrestler
- Aslan-Beg Abashidze (1877–1924), Muslim Georgian nobleman and general
- Aslan Khan Daghestani (fl. early 18th-century), Safavid official
- Aslan bey Gardashov (1866–1920), Azerbaijani statesman
- Aslan bey Safikurdski (1880–1937), Azerbaijani statesman
- Aslan-Bey Shervashidze, Prince of the Principality of Abkhazia from 1808–10
- Aslan Dashayev (born 1989), Russian footballer
- Aslan Datdeyev (born 1973), Russian footballer
- Aslan Doguzov (born 1991), Russian footballer
- Aslan Dudiyev (born 1990), Russian footballer
- Aslan Dyshekov (born 1987), Russian footballer
- Aslan Dzeytov (born 1990), Russian footballer
- Aslan Dzharimov (born 1939), former president of the Republic of Adygea, Russia
- Aslan Goplachev (born 1970), Russian footballer and coach
- Aslan Karatsev (born 1993), Russian tennis player
- Aslan Khan Daghestani (born in the 17th century), early-18th-century Safavid dynasty official in Persia
- Aslan Kerimov (born 1973), footballer, most capped member of the Azerbaijan National Football Team
- Aslan Khuriyev (born 1984), Russian footballer
- Aslan Mashukov (born 1984), Russian footballer
- Aslan Maskhadov (1951–2005), Chechen leader
- Aslan Musin (born 1954), former Speaker of the Parliament of Kazakhstan
- Aslan Tkhakushinov (born 1947), President of the Republic of Adygea, Russia
- Aslan Tlebzu (born 1981), Russian folk musician of Adyghe origin
- Aslan Usoyan (1937–2013), Russian outlaw of Kurdish origin
- Aslan Zaseev (born 1982), Russian footballer

=== Surname ===
- Ahmet Aslan (born 2001), Turkish footballer
- Ahmet Aslan (born 1968), Turkish musician
- Ali Aslan (born 1933), Syrian general and politician
- Ana Aslan (1897–1988), Armenian-Romanian biologist, physician, and inventor
- Aslı Ceren Aslan (born 1990), Turkish journalist
- Aygül Berivan Aslan (born 1981), Austrian politician
- Berkin Kamil Aslan (born 1992), Turkish footballer
- Beyzanur Aslan (born 2001), Azerbaijani women's footballer
- Deniz Aslan (born 1989), Turkish footballer
- Ednan Aslan (born 1959), Austrian-Turkish Islamic scholar
- Emil Aslan (born 1978), Czech political scientist
- Emre Aslan, Turkish badminton player
- Ercüment Aslan (born 1976), Turkish boxer
- Erdinç Aslan (born 1968), Turkish weightlifter
- Eylül Aslan, Turkish feminist
- Faramarz Aslani (1945–2024), Iranian singer-songwriter
- Farhad Aslani (born 1966), Iranian actor
- George Aslan, Turkish politician
- Grégoire Aslan (1908–1982), Armenian actor
- Hamdi Aslan (born 1967), Turkish footballer and coach
- Hatice Aslan (born 1962), Turkish actress
- Hidir Aslan (1958–1984), executed Turkish rebel
- Ibrahim Aslan (1935–2012), Egyptian writer
- İbo Aslan (born 1996), Turkish mixed martial artist
- Juan Contino Aslán (born 1969), Cuban politician
- Kemal Aslan (born 1981), Turkish footballer
- Kevork Aslan, Armenian historian
- Madalyn Aslan (born 1963), American astrologer
- Mahmoud Aslan (1902 – after 1971), Tunisian writer
- Mehmet Ali Aslan (born 1975), Turkish politician
- Metin Aslan (born 1978), Austrian footballer of Turkish origin
- Mihail Aslan (1857–1936), Romanian general
- Murat Aslan (born 1986), Turkish volleyball player
- Nora Aslan (born 1937), Argentine artist
- Nuri Aslan (born 1969), Turkish politician
- Nurullah Aslan (born 1997), Turkish footballer
- Özgecan Aslan (1995–2015), Turkish university student and murder victim
- Raoul Aslan (1886–1958), Austrian actor of Greek-Armenian ancestry
- Reza Aslan (born 1972), Iranian-American author
- Sayavush Aslan (1935–2013), Azerbaijani actor
- Sude Nur Aslan (born 2007), Turkish female boxer
- Yasin Aslan (born 1953), Turkish author
- Yiğit Aslan (born 2004), Turkish swimmer

=== Nickname ===
- Aslan (artist) (Alain Gourdon; 1930–2014), French painter, sculptor, and pin-up artist
- Nihat Bekdik (1902–1972), Turkish professional footballer
- Kevork Chavush (1870–1907), Armenian fedayi leader and Armenian Revolutionary Federation member
- Ali Pasha of Yanina (1741–1822), pasha of western Rumelia
