= Aslan (disambiguation) =

Aslan is a fictional lion in C. S. Lewis's Chronicles of Narnia.

Aslan (a Turkic word meaning lion, fearless, warrior) may also refer to:

== People ==
- Aslan (name), including people with the name

== In fiction ==
- Aslan, a black warhorse in the manga series Red River
- Aslan, the name of a drug in the 2001 novel The Corrections by Jonathan Franzen
- Aslan Battour, the deceased father of Serge Battour in the manga series Kaze to Ki no Uta
- Aslan Jade Callenreese, alias Ash Lynx, the main character of the manga and anime series Banana Fish

== Games ==
- Aslan (Traveller), an extraterrestrial race from the Traveller roleplaying game
- Aslan (fanzine), a British roleplaying fanzine published in the 1980s

== Places ==
- Aslan, Izeh, a village in Izeh County, Khuzestan Province, Iran
- Aslan Duz, the capital of Aslan Duz District, Parsabad County, Ardabil Province, Iran
- Aslan Duz District, a district in Parsabad County, Ardabil Province, Iran

== Other uses ==
- Aslan (band), an Irish rock band, formed in 1982
- Aslan Pasha Mosque, Ioannina, Greece
- Hyundai Aslan, a mid-size sedan sold in South Korea

== See also ==
- Arslan (disambiguation)
- Arsalan
- Ruslan (disambiguation)
- Ruslan (given name)
