= Aslanov =

Aslanov, feminine: Aslanova is a Russian-language patronymic surname derived from the Turkic given name Aslan. Notable people with the name include:

- Aslan Aslanov (born 1951), Azerbaijani journalist
- Fuad Aslanov (born 1976), Azerbaijani boxer
- Hazi Aslanov (1910–1945), Azerbaijani Major-General of the Soviet armoured troops during World War II
- Nikola Aslanov (1875–1905), Bulgarian revolutionary
- Vugar Aslanov (born 1964), Azerbaijani journalist
- Vüqar Aslanov (born 1976), Azerbaijani Olympic wrestler
