= Ahmet Arslan =

Ahmet Arslan may refer to:

- Ahmet Arslan (academic) (born 1944), Turkish philosopher and academic
- Ahmet Arslan (athlete) (born 1986), Turkish long-distance runner
- Ahmet Arslan (footballer) (born 1994), German footballer of Turkish origin
- Ahmet Arslan (politician) (born 1962), Turkish member of parliament and cabinet minister
- Ahmad Aladdin (Ahmad Aladdin Arslan, died 2014), Jordanian military leader

== See also ==
- Ahmet Aslan (disambiguation)
