= Arslan Pasha =

Arslan Pasha may refer to one of the following:

- Arslan Mataraci Pasha, variously Ottoman governor of Tripoli, Damascus and Sidon in 1694–1704
- Arslan Mehmed Pasha (Bosnia), Ottoman governor of Bosnia in 1789
