= Arslanović =

Arslanović is a patronymic surname derived from the given name Arslan. It may refer to:

- Ibrahim Arslanovic (born 1952), Croatian footballer
- Izet Arslanović (born 1973), Bosnian footballer
- Mustafa Arslanović (born 1960), Bosnian footballer
