= Alessandro Misciasci =

Italian pianist

Alessandro Misciasci (* in Catania, Sicily) is an Italian pianist specialized in lieder accompaniment, répétiteur and teacher of musical rehearsal at the Salzburg Mozarteum.

== Life ==
Misciasci completed his piano studies at the Conservatorio di musica Agostino Steffani in Castelfranco Veneto and in 1986 became a prize-winner at the International Competition for Lied Accompanists in The Hague. In the same year, the rector of the Mozarteum, Paul Schilhawsky (1918–1995), brought him to the Mozarteum, where Misciasci has since worked as a répétiteur for musical rehearsals. He accompanied master classes of opera singers such as Elisabeth Schwarzkopf, Josef Greindl and Christa Ludwig at the piano. He has also worked as musical assistant to Nikolaus Harnoncourt, Riccardo Muti, Daniele Gatti, Gianandrea Noseda and Christian Thielemann in several productions of the Salzburg Festival.

As a lied accompanist, he has performed with Markus Werba, Zurab Zurabishvili, Mirjam Tola, Sokolin Asllani and Asmik Grigorian, among others, and appeared at the Szent Gellért Festival in Szeged.

Misciasci is committed to contemporary music. He acted as song accompanist to Caren van Oijen in the 2001 CD release of the vocal work (45 songs) by Dutch composer Erik Lotichius (1929–2015). In the same year, he performed the world premiere of the song cycle IX Psalms by Thomas Bernhard for mezzo-soprano and piano by Hubert Steppan (1928–2009) at the Salzburg Landestheater on the occasion of the celebration of 70 years of Thomas Bernhard.

In 2012, the Conservatorio di musica Agostino Steffani honoured Misciasci with the Premio alla carriera for special musical merits.

In 2017, Misciasci was a guest lecturer at the Iceland Academy of Fine Arts, where he also taught a master class in singing in 2016.

== Discography ==
- Erik Lotichius: Vocal Works. With Caren van Oijen, Hantzen Houwert, Benny Laureyn, Erik Lotichius (Donemus; 2001)
