= Ylli (name) =

Ylli is an Albanian masculine given name, which means "star". Yllka and Yllita are the female versions.

Ylli may refer to:

- Ylli Asllani (born 1959), politician
- Ylli Bufi (born 1948), politician
- Ylli Lama (born 1954), politician
- Ylli Manjani (born 1973), Albanian lawyer and politician
- Ylli Pango (born 1952), psychologist and politician
- Ylli Rakipi (born 1959), Albanian journalist and television host
- Ylli Sallahi (born 1994), football player
- Ylli Shameti (born 1984), football player
- Ylli Shehu (born 1966), football player
- Ylli Vesel Shehu (born 1981), Albanian politician
