= Asllani =

Asllani is a surname, from the Albanian personal name Asllan (definite form Asllani), from aslan ‘lion’, a loanword from Turkish.

Notable people with the surname include:

- Ali Asllani (1884–1966), Albanian poet
- Fisnik Asllani (born 2002), footballer
- Hafiz Mahmud Asllani (1932–2021), Albanian, hafiz, alim and Quran teacher
- Ismet Asllani (1955–1999), Kosovar Albanian businessman, humanitarian and logistics commander
- Klodian Asllani (born 1977), Albanian footballer
- Kosovare Asllani (born 1989), Albanian-Swedish footballer who plays in the English, Women's Super League
- Kristjan Asllani (born 2002), Albanian footballer
- Mersim Asllani (born 1999), Kosovan footballer
- Muho Asllani (1937–2025), Albanian politician
- Sokolin Asllani, Albanian opera singer
- Ylli Asllani (born 1959), Albanian politician
