= Ahmet Aslan =

Ahmet Aslan may refer to:

- Ahmet Aslan (footballer) (born 2001), Turkish footballer
- Ahmet Aslan (musician) (born 1971), Kurdish musician

== See also ==
- Ahmet Arslan (disambiguation)
