= Carlos Alberto Leumann =

Argentine poet, teacher, and essayist

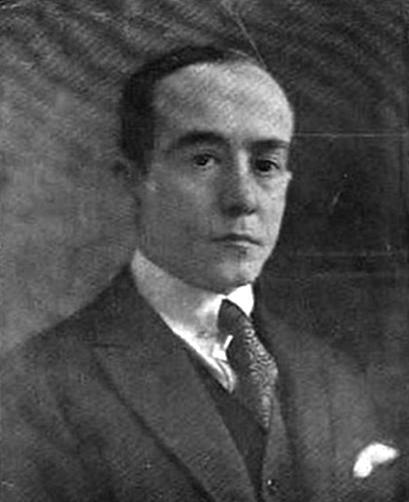
- Born: August 17, 1886; Santa Fe, Argentina
- Died: June 17, 1952 (aged 65); Buenos Aires, Argentina
- Occupations: Writer; literature professor

Carlos Alberto Leumann (1886–1952) was an Argentine poet, teacher, and essayist. He wrote essays on science and metaphysics, and was the director of the literary supplement in La Nación. His poems have been published in Spanish language anthologies.

Leumann was born in Santa Fe, Argentina on the 17 of August, 1886, to strict Protestant parents who disliked that he wrote. At age six he was orphaned, and at age 17 he graduated from the University of Buenos Aires. He then became a professor in literature. During 1916 Leumann was editor-in-chief of La Nota, a literary magazine created and directed by Emin Arslan.

In 1927 he published his first widely read work of fiction in La Nación. In 1936 he married, but had no children. He was a friend of Enrique Banchs. He died on June 17, 1952, in Buenos Aires.

== Works ==
- El libro de la duda y los cantos ingenuos (Poesía 1909)
- El novicio (Obra de Teatro 1918)
- Nieve : versos (Poema 1919)
- Adriana Zumarán (Novela 1921)
- La vida victoriosa (Novela 1922)
- El empresario del genio (Novela 1926)
- Trasmundo : novela de otra vida (Novela 1930)
- El país del relámpago (Cuento 1932)
- Los gauchos a pie (Novela-1938)
- El poeta creador : cómo hizo Hernández 'la vuelta de Martín Fierro' (1945)
- El poeta creador (Ensayo 1945)
- Una excursión alos indios ranqueles (1949)
- Paisaje y alma del campo argentino (1952)
