= Didem Arslan Yılmaz =

Turkish news anchor (born 1974)

- Born: Didem Arslan; 12 January 1974 (age 52); Istanbul, Turkey
- Occupations: TV presenter, news anchor
- Years active: 1992–present
- Spouse: Kürşat Yılmaz
- Children: 1

Didem Arslan Yılmaz (born 12 January 1974) is a Turkish news anchor and TV presenter. She graduated from Press School in 1992. She started journalism in 1992 by presenting news on Flash TV. She then transferred to Kanal D and worked there as a reporter.

She also presented the programs Çalar Saat and Serdar Cebe'yle Haftasonu Haberleri. Yılmaz then joined Uğur Dündar's team on Star TV. She was eventually employed by Habertürk and presented the program Haber Sahası.

Yılmaz later became a contributor and presenter for CNN Türk. She presented the programs 13 Ajansı, Gün Ortası and Türkiye'nin Nabzı before announcing her return to Habertürk in May 2016. In August 2020, she left her position at Habertürk and joined Show TV to present the program Didem Arslan Yılmaz'la Vazgeçme.

Despite earning awards and acclaim, she has also been involved in controversial incident on live TV. Her argument with fellow presenter Tansu Çiller on TV resulted in him holding her hand and trying to dip his nails into her hands. In late 2020, during the Türkiye'nin Nabzı program she constantly interrupted Dr. Mehmet Çilingiroğlu and her behavior was heavily criticized in the media.

In 2021, she was accused of anti-Kurdish discrimination. On her show during a live broadcast on a Turkish TV channel, she interrupted a Kurdish speaker telling her "This is the Republic of Turkey. We do not speak the Eastern language," referring to the Kurdish language.

== Awards ==
- 2005: Turkish Journalists' Association Success Award (Kaçak Ambulanslar)
- 2013: Yeni Yüzyıl University Communication Award for the Best Discussion Program (Türkiye'nin Nabzı)
- 2014: TV News Ethics Award by the Media Ethics Council (Türkiye'nin Nabzı)
- 2015: Magazine Journalists Association's 21st Golden Objective Awards, War Month Special Award (Türkiye'nin Nabzı)
