= Zeina Talal Arslan =

Lebanese princess

Emira Zeina Arslan (Arabic: زينة طلال أرسلان) is the wife of Emir Talal Arslan, son of Lebanese independence figure Emir Majid Arslan II and Head of the House of Arslan which includes the Lakhmid throne of Al-Hira. She takes care of social affairs and is not involved in politics.

== Biography ==
Emira Zeina was born in Beirut on January 3, 1971. She then moved to London with her family due to the Lebanese Civil War. There, she obtained her bachelor's degree from Richmond University before meeting Emir Talal in 1992 during his visit to England. They got married in 1993 and bore two children: Emir Majid and Emira Kinda.

== Social duties ==
Emira Zeina heads three social foundations:

- The Motherhood Committee - Aley Qaza -
- The Lebanese Women's Forum
- Emir Majid Arslan's foundation - The South Province

The Motherhood Committee has a mammography and ultra-sound center in Aley and runs an annual charity event for the benefit of the center. She is also head of the Lebanese Women Forum (LWF) that has more than five medical centres in Mount Lebanon, the Metn and the South, where people can benefit from fundamental medical treatments and advice for free. The LWF also owns a textile factory that produces products such as clothes, dresses, table arrangements and towels.

Emir Majid Arslan's foundation is also a social foundation that has a nursery department in Hasbaya, a medical center in Choueifat and a girls' foyer.

== See also ==
- List of political families
- Emir Talal Arslan
- Emir Majid Arslan II
- Emir Shakib Arslan
- Lakhmids
- Druze in Lebanon
