= Arslan Khan =

Arslan Khan can refer to:

- Arslan Khan (Canadian cricketer) (born 1999), Canadian cricketer
- Arslan Khan (Indian cricketer) (born 1999), Indian cricketer
- Arslan Khan (prince), prince of the Karluks
