= Sartaqtai =

Chinggissid, son of Orda

Sartaqtai was a great-grandson of the first emperor of the Mongol Empire, Genghis Khan and the first son of Orda Khan. His name was made into a title, meaning "Arslan of the Sart", and was bestowed upon Prince of Karluks.
