= Yllka =

Yllka is an Albanian feminine given name, which means "star". Ylli is the masculine form. People bearing the name Yllka include:

- Yllka Berisha (born 1988), Swedish model and singer of Albanian origin
- Yllka Gashi (born 1982), Kosovar Albanian actress
- Yllka Kuqi (born 1982), Kosovar Albanian singer
- Yllka Mujo (born 1953), Albanian actress
