= Arslan (disambiguation) =

Arslan is a given name and a surname.

Arslan may also refer to:

- Arslaan, a 2008 Indian fantasy television series based on the Persian epic of Amir Arsalan
- Arslan, or A Wind From Bukhara, a 1976 science fiction novel by M. J. Engh
- Arslan Senki, or The Heroic Legend of Arslan, a fantasy novel and manga series based on Persian history
- Arslan Tash, archaeological site in Aleppo, Syria
- Kingdom of Arslan, a fictional Middle Eastern country and the setting of the manga series Area 88
