= Sokolin Asllani =

Sokolin Aslla
- Born: Fushё-Arrez, Albania

Sokolin Asllani (born in Fushё-Arrez) is an Albanian opera singer (baritone). He is also an Austrian citizen.

== Life ==
Asllani attended the Prenkё Jakova music high school in Shkodër. He first studied piano and then singing at the University of Arts Tirana, where he graduated in 1998. Later he completed further studies in Vienna with Yevgeny Nesterenko.

After graduating in 1998, he was engaged by the Albanian State Opera in Tirana in the title role in Rossini's Il Signor Bruschino, as well as Don Alfonso in Così fan tutte and the title role in Don Giovanni. This was followed in 2001 by an appearance in Germany as Orpheus in Gluck's Orpheus and Eurydice. From 2003 to 2006 Asllani was a member of the ensemble at the Stadttheater Klagenfurt and made his debut at the Zurich Opera House in the 2007/2008 season as Ping in Turandot. In the following season he appeared as Marquis de Posa in Don Carlos at the Hamburg State Opera and as Marcello in La Bohème at the Theater Basel.

Engagements also took him to the Volksoper Wien, the Wiener Kammeroper, the Theater an der Wien as part of the Wiener Festwochen, the Budapest State Opera, the Grand Theatre Poznań and the Heidenheim Opera Festival.

He has performed in the Great Hall of the Vienna Musikverein, in the Vienna Konzerthaus as well as in the Roy Thomson Hall in Toronto and in the Lincoln Center in New York with the Vienna Mozart Orchestra, in the Kulturpalast in Dresden, in the Svetlantovsky Sal in Moscow, with the Boston Symphony Orchestra in the Symphony Hall Boston, in the Avery Fisher Hall in New York and in the Kimmel Center (Kimmel Cultural Campus) in Philadelphia.

Asllani is involved in the Austria Kultur International project of the Austrian Federal Ministry for European and International Affairs and performed there in 2015 as part of a concert series in Shkodra and Tirana together with Mirjam Tola.

== Repertoire (selection) ==
- Bizet: Moralès in Carmen
- Puccini: Ping in Turandot, Schaunard and Marcello in La Bohème
- Verdi: Rodrigo Posa in Don Carlos, Graf Luna in Il trovatore, Giorgio Germont in La traviata and Marullo in Rigoletto
- Donizetti: Stefano in Viva la Mamma!, Dr. Malatesta in Don Pasquale, Belcore in L'elisir d'amore and Enrico in Lucia di Lammermoor
- Rossini: Bruschino senior in Il signor Bruschino, Figaro in Il barbiere di Siviglia
- Mozart: Don Giovanni in Don Giovanni, Guglielmo and Don Alfonso in Così fan tutte, Graf Almaviva in Le nozze di Figaro
- Cavalli: Jupiter in The Love of Apollo and Daphne
- Gounod: Valentin in Faust
- Hiller: Das Traumfresserchen
- Nicolai: Herr Fluch in Die lustigen Weiber von Windsor
- Strauß: Dr. Falke in Die Fledermaus
