= İhsan Arslan =

Turkish politician (born 1948)

Mehmet İhsan Arslan (born 1 January 1948 in Sason) is a Turkish businessman and politician of Kurdish origin, a founding member of the deputy for the Justice and Development Party (AKP) and also a former member of the Grand National Assembly of Turkey He was a part-owner of the Zaman newspaper, and in the 1990s was Vice-President of the Islamist human rights organization Mazlum-Der. As such he was involved into the negotiations with the Kurdistan Workers' Party to achieve a release of captive Turkish soldiers and was shortly detained for this. He was elected to the Turkish parliament as a representative of Diyarbakir for the pro-Kurdish Democratic People's Party (DEHAP) in the parliamentarian elections of 2002. He later was involved in the founding of the AKP and in the parliamentary elections in 2007 he was elected as a representative of Diyarbakir. and was denied the chance to run for re-election in 2011 by the AKP, allegedly because of his position on the Kurdish question. He was one of the architects of the AKP policies towards the Kurds, focusing on the bond of the muslim religion between the Kurds and Turks. In an interview he gave to BBC Turkey, he emphasized that the AKP policies towards the Kurds were not constructive and if Turkey wouldn't be able to solve the conflict with the Kurdistan Workers' Party, other countries would step in.

His son is Mücahit Arslan, a current parliamentarian for the AKP.
