= Eylül Aslan =

Turkish feminist

Eylül Aslan is a photography artist and a Turkish feminist that is known for her gender-defying photography.

== Early life ==
Aslan was born and raised in Istanbul, Turkey. She studied French language and literature at Istanbul University and eventually moved to Berlin, Germany. Born to a mother who was a complete liberal feminist and the Chief of Women's Rights for the Turkish opposition party CHP, and a father, surprisingly, from the conservative north and is devoutly Muslim, Aslan believes her family is an accurate representation of Turkey itself. “There is a mix of everything.”

After her parents’ divorce, Aslan (the only child) spent most of her time with her mother. As she had once stated: “She’s had a big influence on me. She’s the one who gave me my first camera – so it’s all her fault.”

== Photography ==
Aslan has also been “sexually harassed more times than she can count. Women around the world are treated like objects, but it’s somehow more aggressive in Turkey.” She started with self-portrait, modeling for her own photos. Her cousin then became her first muse, and then gradually her friends wanted to model for her. However, they would constantly ask her to make sure that nobody recognized them.

Aslan's art has a clear focus on women. She positions her models in states of undress before cracked mirrors and distorted glass, and creates figures that are fractured and bare, consciously objectifying the female form. As topics such as gender and sexuality have grown to be increasing important in Turkey, Aslan believes such reactions to her work is due to the lack of open discourse about women in Turkish society. “We don’t have female role-models that women can attach to,” she explains.

In 2008, at the insistence of her cousin, and despite her father's approval, Eylül started a Flickr account and uploaded her photos, formally attaching her name to her work. By 2012, her work had gained a following in Turkey.“I cried at my first exhibition in Istanbul”, Eylül says, “women came up to me and said, ‘We have to turn the mirror on ourselves, to look at ourselves and see if we are happy.’"
