= Arsalan =

Arsalan is a given name and surname, a variant of Arslan.

Notable people with the name include:

== Given name ==
- Amir Arsalan Motahari
- Arsalan Anjum Muhammad
- Arsalan Anwar (born 1986), Pakistani cricketer
- Arsalan Arif
- Arsalan Baiz
- Arsalan Baraheni, artistic director of Montreal Independent Film Festival
- Arsalan Budazhapov
- Arsalan Fathipour
- Arsalan Iftikhar (born 1977), American human rights lawyer
- Arsalan Iftikhar Chaudhry
- Arsalan Kamkar (born 1960), Iranian musician of Kurdish origin
- Arsalan Khalatbari
- Arsalan Kazemi (born 1990), Iranian basketball player
- Arsalan Mir
- Arsalan Nami or Arsi Nami (born 1984), Iranian singer-songwriter
- Arsalan Perwaiz Siddiqui
- Arsalan Pouria
- Arsalan Taj Hussain
- Arsalan Qadir

== Surname ==
- Ali Arsalan
- Kanwar Arsalan

== Fictional characters ==
- Amir Arsalan, protagonist of the Persian epic Amir Arsalan-e Namdar

== See also ==
- Arsala Rahmani Daulat
- Qezel Arsalan, a peak of the Mount Alvand range, Iran
