= Enrique Banchs =

Argentine poet (1888–1968)

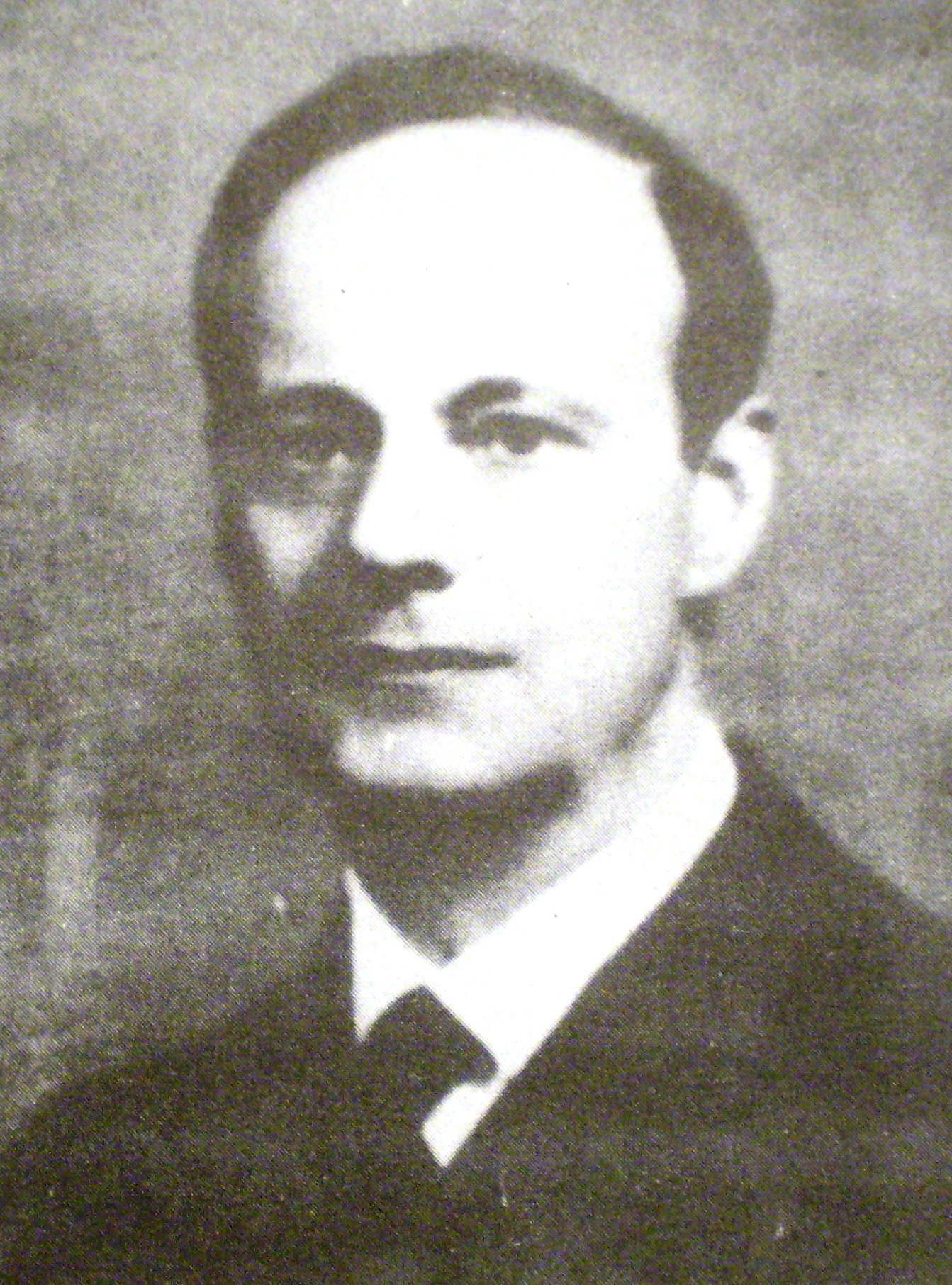
Enrique Banchs.

Enrique Banchs (1888–1968) was an Argentine poet. He published all his work in the space of four years at the beginning of the 20th century. In his four works, Las barcas (1907), El libro de los elogios (1908), El cascabel del halcón (1909) and La urna (1911). Banchs cultivated an ephemeral, classicistic style drawing inspiration from the Siglo de Oro. His final work was composed in sonnets, a form which had already been almost completely abandoned by that time. Since 1930 he published in the newspaper La Prensa (Buenos Aires) stories for children, stories with children's characters, animals, and stories set in oriental or other exotic environments. These texts appeared signed with the pseudonyms J. Olive and E. Lloret, or anonymously. Banchs did not publish any more poems but he remained a part of the Argentine literary scene, and a member of the Argentine Academy of Letters. He was a friend of Carlos Alberto Leumann.

== Works ==
=== Poetry ===
- 1907: Las barcas
- 1908: El libro de los elogios
- 1909: El cascabel del halcón
- 1911: La urna

=== Prose ===
- 1941: Discurso de recepción en la Academia Argentina de Letras
- 1943: Averiguaciones sobre la autoridad en el idioma
