= SABIS =

Educational organization

SABIS Educational Systems, Inc.
- Founded: 1886; 140 years ago
- Founders: Tanios Saad and Louisa Proctor
- Headquarters: Choueifat, Lebanon
- Services: education management organization
- Website: sabis.net

SABIS is a global education management organization headquartered in Lebanon, operating a network of private schools and charter schools worldwide. Founded in 1886 with the establishment of the International School of Choueifat in Lebanon, SABIS has grown into a multinational network with schools in over 20 countries, including the Gulf, the United States, Europe, Africa, and Latin America.

SABIS schools serve students from kindergarten through grade 12. The organization continues to expand, with recent developments including partnerships in emerging markets and the modernization of its flagship campuses.

== History ==
The origins of SABIS trace back to 1886 with the founding of the International School of Choueifat in Choueifat, a village near Beirut, Lebanon. Initially established as a school for girls by Reverend Tanios Saad and Ms. Louisa Proctor, it later began admitting boys as well.

=== Expansion ===
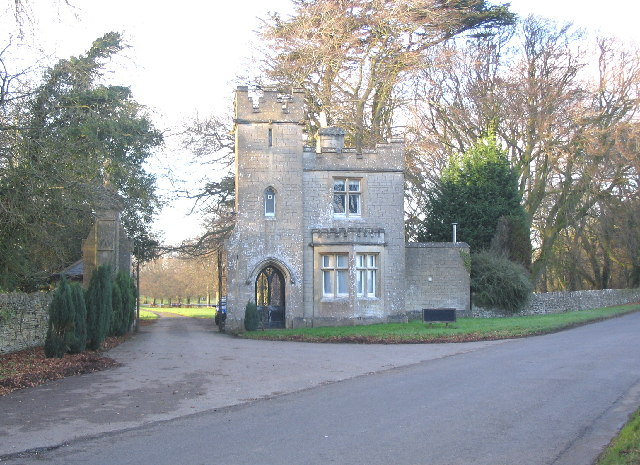
The gatehouse of the now-closed Ashwicke Hall School near Bath, UK

SABIS began expanding beyond Lebanon in the mid-1970s under the leadership of Alaa Kamal. The first international school opened in Sharjah, UAE, in 1976. Today, SABIS operates numerous schools across six emirates in the UAE, including The International Schools of Choueifat and SABIS International Schools.

In 2019, SABIS partnered with Arada to establish a K–12 international school in Aljada, Sharjah’s largest lifestyle megaproject. The organization also runs schools in countries such as Bahrain, Brazil, China, Qatar, Oman, Iraq, Egypt, Kenya, Jordan, Panama, Saudi Arabia, Pakistan, Germany, Kurdistan, and the United States. Notably, SABIS operated a school in Bath, UK, which closed in 2019, and opened a school in Dreamland, Baku, Azerbaijan in 2015, the largest SABIS building to date.

In Sub-Saharan Africa, SABIS collaborates with Africa Crest Education (ACE) Holdings. In Latin America, the organization entered the Brazilian market in 2018 with a $50 million investment plan. The SABIS International School Campinas – Costa Verde in Panama opened in September 2017.

In the United States, SABIS operates six schools: five public charter schools in Arizona, Massachusetts, and Michigan, and one private school in Minnesota. The Collegiate Charter School of Lowell in Massachusetts began operating in 2013.

In November 2023, the flagship campus in Abu Dhabi, United Arab Emirates was demolished for upgrades. The campus, operational since 1979, has produced notable alumni in both the UAE and international sectors. The flagship campus from which the head office of SABIS operates has been fully relocated to the Yas Island campus, whilst a new campus in Abu Dhabi going by the name SIS Al Bateen has been opened.
