= Ednan Aslan =

Austrian-Turkish scholar of Islam

Ednan Aslan (born 7 November 1959 in Bayburt) is an Austrian-Turkish scholar of Islam and professor of Islamic religious education at the University of Vienna.

== Biography ==
Aslan was born on 7 November 1959 in Bayburt, Turkey. Aslan graduated from the University of Applied Sciences in Esslingen, Germany in 1988. He studied pedagogy and political science at the Universities of Tübingen and Stuttgart from 1990 to 1992. In 1996, he received his doctorate for his research on the religious education of Muslim children in Austria and Germany. Aslan has been a professor of Islamic religious education at the University of Vienna's Institute of Educational Science since 2008.

== Works ==
- Religion and Violence: Muslim and Christian Theological and Pedagogical Reflections
