= Ahmad Aladdin =

Jordanian military leader (died 2014)

Ahmad Aladdin Arslan
- أحمد علاءالدين أرسلان
- Born: Ahmad Aladdin Arslan; Zarqa, Jordan
- Died: 17 November 2014; German Airspace
- Burial place: Chechen Cemetery
- Military career
- Allegiance: Jordan
- Branch: Jordanian armed forces
- Service years: 1957–1987
- Rank: Major General
- Nickname: Yakam
- Commands: Head of SWAT-Public Security Directorate, 1970–1971; Head of Special Security and Protection division, 1971–1973; commander of Special Operations, 1973–1979; Head of Military Operations Command, 1979–1981; commander and military ruler of the Jordanian Northern territory, 1981–1982; Vice Chief of the General Staff, 1982–1984; Inspector General of the Jordanian Armed Forces
- Conflicts: Six-Day War; Black September in Jordan; Battle of Karameh; Battle of Mirbat
- Other work: Governor at the Ministry of Interior

Ahmad Aladdin Arslan (died 17 November 2014) was a Jordanian military leader of Chechen descent. He attained the rank of Major General. He was the only officer to have received the Jordanian Order of Military Gallantry "Wisam al-Iqdam al-Askari" twice. He led the response to the 1976 terrorist attack on the Amman InterContinental Hotel.

== Death and burial ==
Aladdin was en route to receive medical treatment in Germany when he died during the flight, aged 72. He was subsequently buried on 19 November 2014 in the Chechen Cemetery in the city of Zarqa. He was buried with military honours. His funeral was attended amongst others by Prince Hashim Al Hussein, Chairman of the Joint Chiefs of Staff Mashal Al Zaben, King Abdullah's advisor for tribal affairs Sharif Fawaz Bin Zaben and ministers and deputies.

== See also ==
- Battle of Mirbat
