= Mücahit Arslan =

Turkish politician

Mücahit Arslan MP

Member of the Grand National Assembly
- Incumbent
- Assumed office 7 June 2015
- Constituency: Ankara (I) (June 2015, Nov 2015, 2018)

Personal details
- Born: Ali İhsan Arslan Ankara, Turkey
- Party: Justice and Development Party (AKP)
- Occupation: Politician, political advisor

Ali İhsan Arslan (more commonly referred to as Mücahit Arslan) is a Turkish politician from the Justice and Development Party (AKP) who has served as a Member of Parliament for Ankara's first electoral district since 7 June 2015. He is the son of İhsan Arslan, the two-term AKP MP from Diyarbakır between 2002 and 2011.

As one of the closest advisors to former Prime Minister and incumbent President Recep Tayyip Erdoğan, Arslan has been described as the Turkish media as Erdoğan's "secret-keeper" and "most secretive" advisor. His candidacy to become an MP in the June 2015 general election was viewed by many commentators as Erdoğan's attempt to dominate his former party with politicians loyal to him in order to maintain his influence in the political process.

== Early life ==
Ali İhsan Arslan was born in Ankara, but states that he actually originates from Diyarbakır. He claims that his has always been referred to by the name Mücahit from the day he was born, with his mother only finding out that his official name recorded on his identity card was Ali İhsan after taking him to the doctors for a vaccination. Arslan himself reports that he first heard him being called Ali İhsan when he first started primary school, claiming that all his friends and family refer to him by the name Mücahit.

Arslan's father is İhsan Arslan, who served as a Member of Parliament for Diyarbakır between 2002 and 2011. İhsan Arslan, who also worked for the pro-Gülen Zaman newspaper, was known for his close ties with the Gülen Movement headed by exiled cleric Fethullah Gülen. He was reported to have been an architect of the now-falsified Ergenekon and Sledgehammer coup trials, when he was reported to have been a 'gang leader' in developing the trial documents that would lead to the wrongful imprisonment of several military officers and pro-opposition journalists.

== Political career ==
=== Advisor to Recep Tayyip Erdoğan ===
Arslan claims that he first met Recep Tayyip Erdoğan in the latter half of the 1990s, through their mutual associate Ömer Çelik. As one of his closest advisors, Arslan was called Erdoğan's 'secret keeper'. When asked about this claim, Arslan stated that knowing about Erdoğan's actions did not necessarily make him a secret keeper. He also stated that their close relationship had also led to exchanges in personal information, though these were far from 'state secrets' according to Arslan.

Numerous claims were made about Arslan and Erdoğan's history by the media, which have commonly referred to Arslan as one of Erdoğan's 'deepest' workers who was sceptical of photo and video opportunities. It was reported by a magazine named Tempo that Arslan was present during the controversial meeting between US President George W. Bush and Erdoğan before the latter became Prime Minister and that Arslan's family have links to the Kurdistan Workers' Party (PKK) and Hezbollah. He is also allegedly a critic of former President Abdullah Gül.

=== Member of Parliament ===
Arslan was formally put forward as an AKP parliamentary candidate for Ankara's first electoral district before the June 2015 general election. His candidacy caused commotion about whether Erdoğan, by this time the President of Turkey, was behind the decision to put him forward, due to his close affiliation with the Presidency. Arslan's candidacy was seen as an attempt by Erdoğan to keep his influence over the AKP. Arslan was part of the AKP's delegation during eventually unsuccessful negotiations with the Republican People's Party (CHP) over the possible formation of a grand coalition after the June 2015 election resulted in a hung parliament.

== See also ==
- Yalçın Akdoğan
- Binali Yıldırım
