= Yasin Aslan =

Yasin Aslan is a Turkish author. He was born in Arpacay Town of Kars Province in Turkey in 1953. He finished Primary and Secondary Schools in Aralik Town of Kars Province and finished High School in Tokat Province. He graduated from Faculty of Education of Seljuk University in 1977. After graduating, he worked as a teacher of English at the English Department of Faculty of Education of Seljuk University over eight years. Then he moved to Munich in 1985 to work in Azerbaijani Department of Radio Free Europe and Radio Liberty. He worked as a Senior Editor and Program Specialist in Azerbaijani Service of Radio Liberty until 1995. After working 10 years in Radio Liberty, in 1998 he was invited to Ankara to work as an advisor to the Prime Minister of Republic of Turkey. He worked with 3 different Prime Ministers until 2003 and then he retired.

He is specialized on Caucasus. He is the author of 13 books mostly on Caucasus and Caspian Region. He also has hundreds of articles both published in Turkey and abroad.

Yasin Aslan is married and has two children.

Published Books:

- Under the Light of Secret Documents, The Attempts of Ethnic Groups to Takeover the State `The Handle of The Axe Is From Us`. First Edition 2005, Second Edition 2009
- Advanced Translation Methods, First Edition 2004, Second Edition 2008
- Balance of Powers in Eurasia in the 21st Century, `Yellow Invasion`, 2004
- Caspian Oil, Causcasus Gordian Knot and Turkey, First Edition 1997, Second Edition 2005.
- A Turning Point in the History of Armenia, First Edition 1996, Second Edition 1997.
- Geopolitical Wished of Third Rome, 1995
- New Democratic Russian Tsars and Turkish Reality, 1994
- Azerbaijan on the Path of Total Independence, 1992
- Azerbaijan`s Struggle for Independence, 1992
- Today Panturkism and Panislamism in Azerbaijan, 1990
- Soul Azerbaijan, 1990

Translations:

- The Way Leading to the Bloody Saturday Night in Baku, Bakhtiyar Vahapzadeh, 1990
- The Last Drive to the South by Vladimir Jirinosky, 1995

Published Articles: Dozens of articles published in English Report on the USSR, Eurasian Studies, Turkish Daily News etc.

Headlines of some of the articles

- Azerbaijani Intellectuals Express Concern over Native Language
- Azerbaijani Press Discusses Link Between Ecological Problems and Health Defects
- Environmental Pollution, Infertility and Divorce in Azerbaijan.
- Founder of Independent Azerbaijan Rehabilitated
- Independent Azerbaijan, 1918-1920: Call to Reevaluate History of Former Nation-State.
- Azerbaijani Intellecftuals Discuss Legeacy of Alphabet Reforms.
- Mosques Reopened in Azerbaijan
- Muslim Support for Baltic Independence
- Psot-Aliev Era Has Already Started
- Power Struggle in Ruling Elite Intensifies in Azerbaijan
- Turkey Holds Key to the Caucasus Conflict
- Azerbaycan Yeniden Hassas Bir Sürece Girmiştir.
- Azerbaycan Türkiye ile Birleşebilir
- Caspian Oil and Pipelines-Interviwes-Rusya ve İran göz ardı edilmemeli

Symposiums and Conferences

He took part several times both in national and international Symposiums and Conferences shown below

- Convention of World Azerbaijanis Congress, October 21–22, 2000. Strasburg-France
- Convention of World Azerbaijanis Congress, 10-12, 2001. Malmo-Sweden
- Conference on Turkish Periodicals, 1997. Haarlem-Holand.
- Integration of Turkish Community to German Society, 1996. Munich-Germany.
- Türkiye, Azerbaycan ve Orta Asya Cumhuriyetlerinde Demokrasi ve Piyasa Ekonomisine Geçiş Sürecinde Bazı Pratik Sorunlar, 16-23 Kasım 1992. Bakü-Azerbaycanç
- Demokrasi ve Pazer Ekonomisine Geçişte Türkiye'nin Tecrübesi ve Eski Sovyet Cumhuriyetlerinin Yeniden Yapılanması, 16-19 Eylül 1991. Yalıkavak-Bodrum-Türkiye.
- First Friendship, Brotherhood and Cooperation Convention of Turkish States and Turkish Speaking Communities, 1993. Antalya-Turkey
- Second Friendship, Brotherhood and Cooperation Convention of Turkish States and Turkish Speaking Communities, 1994. Izmir-Turkey
- Third Friendship, Brotherhood and Cooperation Convention of Turkish States and Turkish Speaking Communities, 1995. Izmir-Turkey
- Fourth Friendship, Brotherhood and Cooperation Convention of Turkish States and Turkish Speaking Communities, 1996. Ankara-Turkey
- Fifth Friendship, Brotherhood and Cooperation Convention of Turkish States and Turkish Speaking Communities, 1997. Istanbul-Turkey
- Sixth Friendship, Brotherhood and Cooperation Convention of Turkish States and Turkish Speaking Communities, 1998. Bursa-Turkey
- Seventh Friendship, Brotherhood and Cooperation Convention of Turkish States and Turkish Speaking Communities, 1999. Denizli-Turkey
- Eight Friendship, Brotherhood and Cooperation Convention of Turkish States and Turkish Speaking Communities, 2000. Samsun-Turkey
- Ninth Friendship, Brotherhood and Cooperation Convention of Turkish States and Turkish Speaking Communities, 2001. Istanbul-Turkey
