= Qezel Arsalan =

Mountain in Iran

Coordinates: 34°45′35″N 48°19′45″E

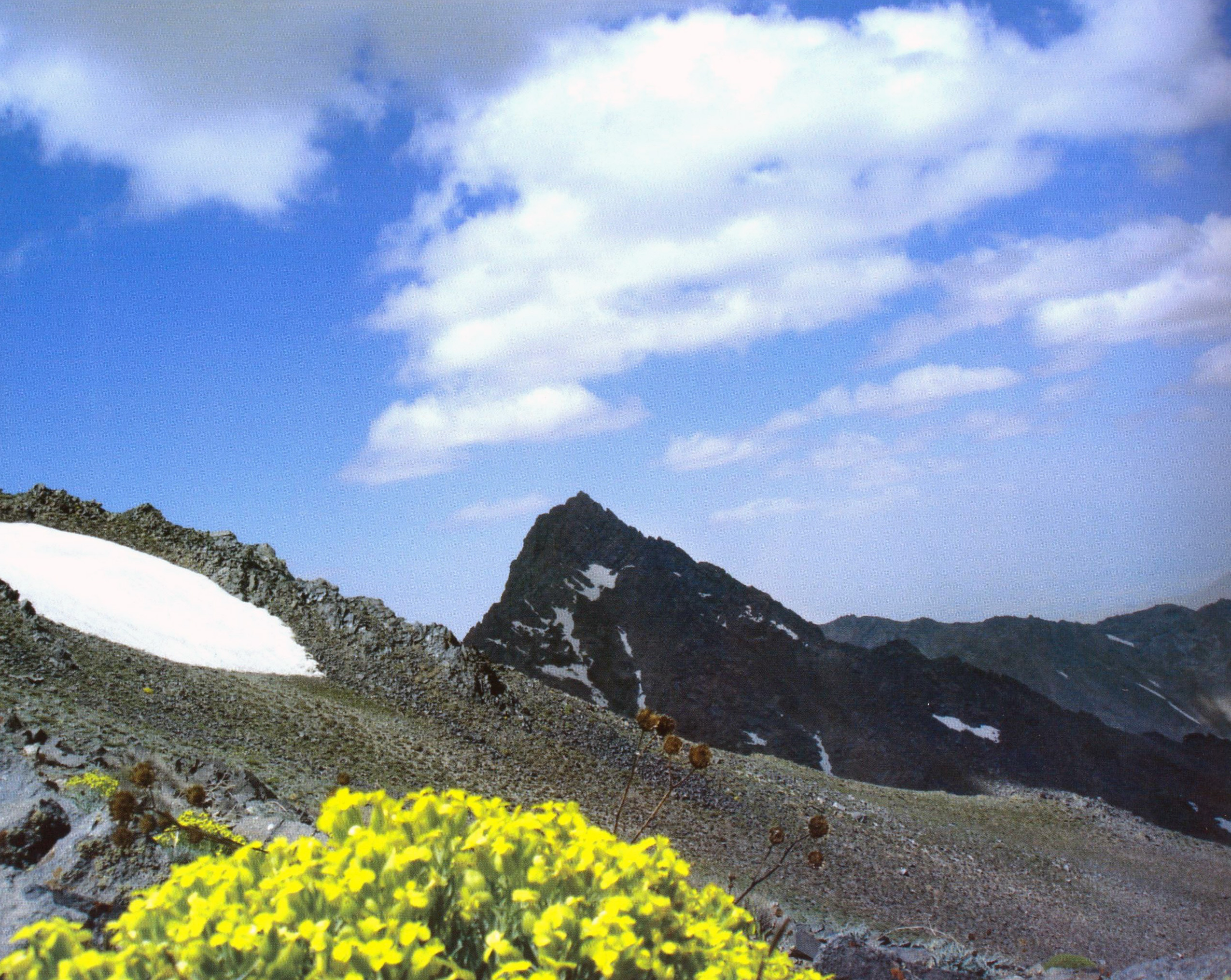

Qezel Arsalan, also Ghezel Arsala (Azerbaijani language: Qızıl Ərsalan, Persian language: قزل ارسلان), is a mountain peak with a height of 3,250 meters in the Alvand ranges of the Zagros mountains in western Iran.

An Iranian movie of the same name was produced in 1956.
