= Majid Arslan =

Lebanese Druze leader

Emir Majid Toufic Arslan الأمير مجيد توفيق أرسلان
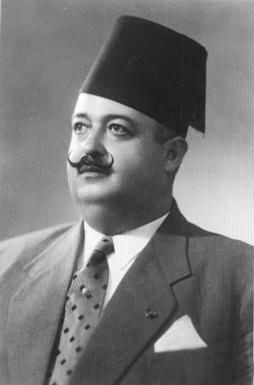
- Born: February 1908; Choueifat, Vilayet of Beirut, Ottoman Empire
- Died: September 18, 1983 (aged 75); Beirut, Lebanon
- Spouses: Lamiss Shehab (m. 1932, died) Khawla Jumblatt (m. 1956)
- Children: 6, including Faysal and Talal

Emir Majid Toufic Arslan (Arabic: الأمير مجيد توفيق أرسلان; February 1908 — September 18, 1983) was a Lebanese Druze leader and head of the Arslan feudal Druze ruling family. As a za'im (political boss), Arslan was the leader of the Yazbaki (Arslan affiliations) faction. Majid Arslan was a national political figure with a role in Lebanon's independence, a long-running Member of the Lebanese Parliament. During his time as a government minister, he held number of important ministerial portfolios, most notably Defense, Health, Telecommunications, Agriculture and Justice.

== Personal life ==
Arslan was the son of Emir Toufic Arslan who helped found Greater Lebanon in 1920. He had three brothers (Nouhad, Riad, Melhem) and a sister (Zahia). Emir Majid studied at the famous French school, Mission Laïque Française.

In 1932, he married his cousin, Emira Lamiss Shehab. They had two sons: Emir Toufic (1935–2003) and Emir Faysal (1941–2009).

In 1956, after his first wife’s death, Emir Majid remarried Khawla Jumblatt. They had three daughters (Zeina, Rima, and Najwa) and a son, Talal, current Head of the House of Arslan and a Druze leader.

He was known for his exceptional skills in horsemanship and would often exercise his hobby in a southern village El Mageedieh (3 km^{2}), named after him.

== Political career ==
Throughout his political career, he had an intense rivalry with Kamal Jumblatt over the leadership amongst the Druze. He has been the longest serving Lebanese politician in a ministerial office and was elected as the Defense Minister twenty two times.

=== Parliament ===
Emir Majid Arslan ran for parliamentary elections in 1931 and won the Druze seat of Aley Cazaa district. His allies also won the elections. From 1931 until his death in 1983, he and his allies would win all the parliamentary elections of 1934, 1937, 1943, 1947, 1951, 1953, 1957, 1960, 1964, 1968 and 1972.

=== Cabinet ===
Over a period of 35 years, Emir Majid Arslan held various ministerial posts.

- October 1937: Minister of Agriculture
- September 1943: Minister of Health & Defense
- July 1944: Minister of Health & Defense
- May 1946: Minister of Health & Defense
- December 1946: Minister of Telecommunications & Defense
- June 1947: Minister of Telecommunications & Defense
- July 1948: Minister of Agriculture & Defense
- October 1949: Minister of Defense
- February 1954: Minister of Health & Defense
- July 1955: Minister of Defense
- March 1956: Minister of Defense
- November 1956: Minister of Health & Minister of Agriculture
- August 1957: Minister of Telecommunications & Defense
- March 1958: Minister of Agriculture
- August 1960: Minister of Defense
- October 1961: Minister of Defense
- October 1968: Minister of Defense & Justice
- January 1969: Minister of Defense
- November 1969: Minister of Defense
- May 1969: Minister of Defense
- July 1973: Minister of State
- October 1974: Minister of Health
- July 1975: Minister of Health & Agriculture & Housing

== Lebanon's 1943 independence ==
Emir Majid Arslan was the leader of the independence of Lebanon in 1943 when the president Bechara El Khoury with fellow ministers were taken to prison to Rachaya by the French. After World War I, in 1918, the French established control over Lebanon by virtue of a League of Nations Mandate. In 1943, the leaders of the country together with the ministers held a national convention and drew up a National Pact stating that:

1. Lebanon is an independent country with an Arab aspect,
2. Lebanon is to be led by neither East nor West,
3. No to Colonialism,
4. Religious sects are to be represented in ministries and all governmental posts,
5. The Lebanese government should bring under its control customs, railways and the Regie tobacco monopoly.
6. The Lebanese government should supervise and control its borders.

On 10 November 1943, the French retaliated by arresting the Lebanese President Bechara El Khoury, Prime Minister Riad Solh and ministers Camille Chamoun, Adel Osseiran and Abdul Hamid Karami. The French used Senegalese mercenaries to transport these political prisoners to Rashaya Fort in the Beqaa Valley. Ministers Majid Arslan, Sabri Hamadeh and Habib Abi Shahla escaped the arrest because they were not in their homes that night. One of Emir Majid's brothers also escaped to Majdel Baana to seek refuge there among members of the Abdel Khalek family as well as the Abi Jumaa's and Nasr's.

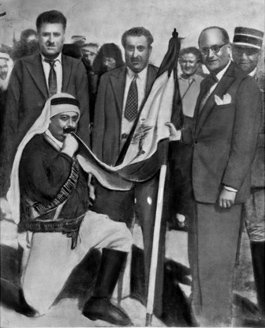
Majid Arslan kissing the Lebanese flag

On 11 November 1943, Arslan, Hamadeh and Abi Shahla created the “Government of Free Lebanon” with Habib Abi Shahla as Prime Minister and Majid Arslan as Head of National Guard 57. Their headquarters were in Bechamoun, a village 30 km from Beirut at the residences of Hussein and Youssef El Halabi (see Lebanese Independence Day). Toufic Hamdan (born February 11, 1927– died August 3, 2009) and his brother Adel Hamdan (born 1924– ) spotted the French Columns marching from the mountains of Aitate, a city on the outskirts of Ain Anoub. Toufic and Adel Hamdan ran back and informed the men of Ain Anoub of the incoming military. The men of Ain Anoub took up arms and blocked the road at the historic landmark, Sindyaneh. When the French forces attempted to remove the road blocks, the battle began led by Adeeb Elbiny (?-?), Naef Soujah (1895–1944), along with his son Najib Soujah (1927 – September 24, 1981), and the only martyr of the battle, Saeed Fakhreddine (?-November 11, 1943), and many more men from Ain Anoub. Saeed Fakhreddine climbed on top of the tank and dropped grenades into the tank, sacrificing his life to achieve victory. The fight ensued and liberators prevailed over the French. At that time Majid Arslan declared a Free Lebanon from the home of the Halabi family in Bechamoun where he sought refuge from the arrests. Meanwhile, disturbances and riots raged all over Lebanon. The Deputies held a secret session during which they drew and signed on a new flag that they handed over to the cabinet of Bechamoun.

On 21 November 1943, Due to riots, open strikes, the armed rebellion of Ain Anoub and the interference of Arab and Western states (mainly Britain), the political prisoners were released. 3 The freed prisoners passed by Bechamoun on their way back home, to thank the rebels. There, they sang the Lebanese National Anthem and Majid Arslan knelt in front of the Lebanese flag and kissed it.

On 22 November 1943, Lebanon was proclaimed an independent state.

== See also ==
- List of political families
- Emir Talal Arslan
- Emira Zeina Talal Arslan
- Emir Shakib Arslan
- Lebanese Independence Day
- Lakhmids
- Druze
- Lebanon
