= Arslan Aydemirov =

Russian footballer

Personal information
- Full name: Arslan Aydemirovich Aydemirov
- Date of birth: 1 August 1977 (age 49)
- Place of birth: Makhachkala, Russian SFSR
- Height: 1.68 m (5 ft 6 in)
- Position: Midfielder

Senior career*
Years	Team	Apps	(Gls)
1997–1999	FC Dynamo Makhachkala	101	(10)
2000–2004	FC Volochanin-Ratmir Vyshny Volochyok	166	(36)
2005	FC Petrotrest St. Petersburg	7	(0)
2005–2007	FC Volochanin-Ratmir Vyshny Volochyok	85	(20)
2008	FC Torpedo Vladimir	35	(1)
2009	FC Dagdizel Kaspiysk	13	(0)
2010–2011	FC Volochanin-Ratmir Vyshny Volochyok	49	(7)
2011–2012	FC Volga Tver	27	(3)
- * Club domestic league appearances and goals

Arslan Aydemirovich Aydemirov (Russian: Арслан Айдемирович Айдемиров; born 1 August 1977) is a former Russian professional football player.

== Club career ==
He played in the Russian Football National League for FC Petrotrest St. Petersburg in 2005.
