= Huseyin Arslan =

Turkish engineer

Huseyin Arslan from the University of South Florida in Tampa, Florida, USA, was named Fellow of the Institute of Electrical and Electronics Engineers (IEEE) in 2016 for contributions to spectrum sensing in cognitive radio networks. Arslan was among the 169 academic inventors identified by the US National Academy of Inventors (NAI) in 2022.

He also serves as the Dean of the Faculty of Engineering and Natural Sciences at Istanbul Medipol University.
