= Talal Arslan =

Lebanese politician

- الأمير طلال أرسلان
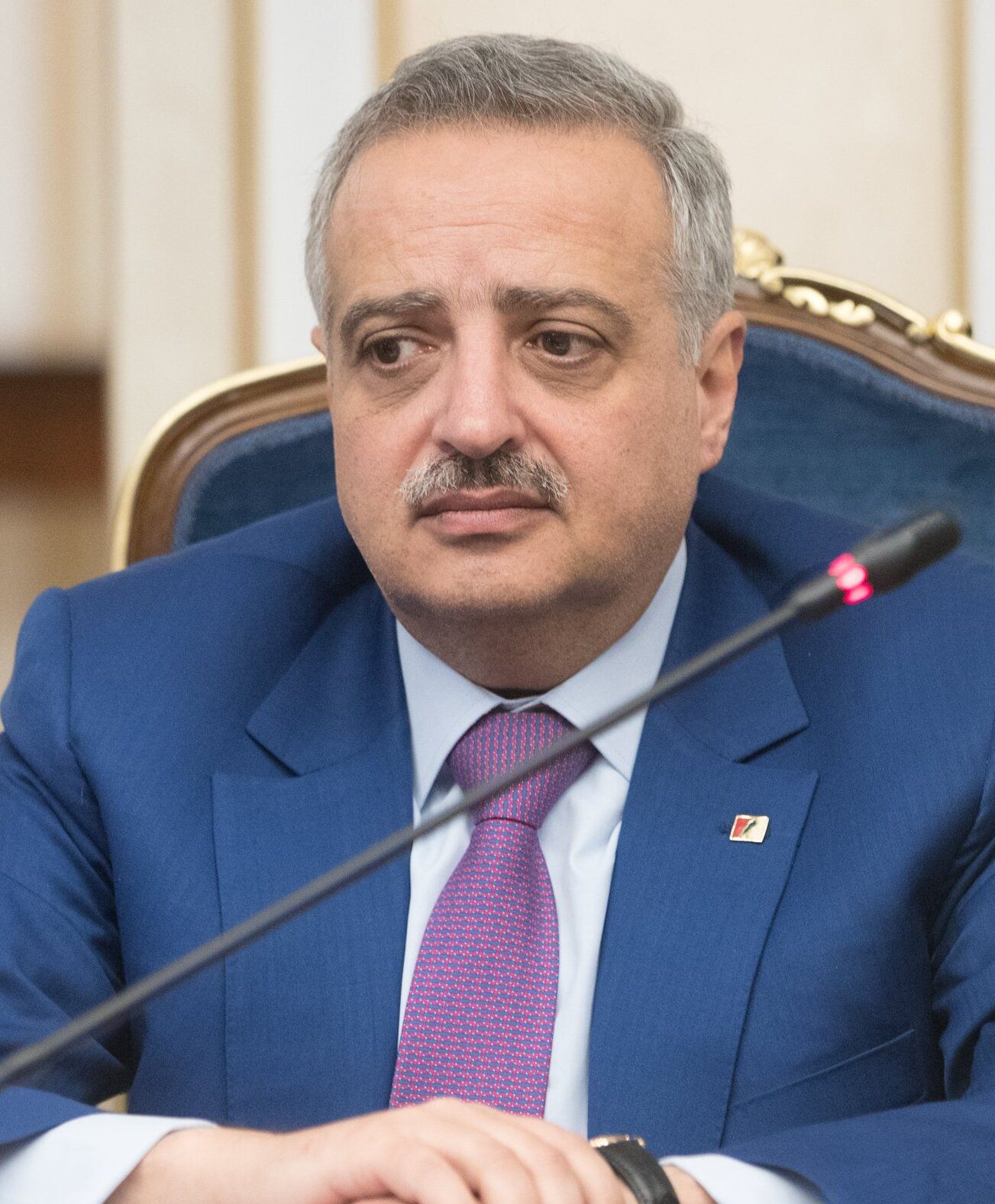
- Talal Arslan, December 2017

Minister of Displaced
- In office 18 December 2016 – 31 January 2019
- Prime Minister: Saad Hariri
- Preceded by: Alice Shabtini
- Succeeded by: Ghassan Atallah
- In office 26 October 2004 – 19 April 2005
- Prime Minister: Omar Karami
- Preceded by: Najib Mikati (Acting)
- Succeeded by: Adel Hamiyeh

Minister of Youth and Sports
- In office 11 July 2008 – 9 November 2009
- Prime Minister: Fouad Siniora
- Preceded by: Ahmad Fatfat
- Succeeded by: Ali Abdullah

Leader of the Lebanese Democratic Party
- Incumbent
- Assumed office 1 July 2001
- Preceded by: Party founded

Member of the Lebanese Parliament
- In office 20 June 2009 – 21 May 2022
- Constituency: Aley District
- In office 7 June 1991 – 20 June 2005
- Constituency: Aley District

Personal details
- Born: 12 June 1965 (age 61) Choueifat, Lebanon
- Party: Lebanese Democratic Party
- Spouse: Zeina Kheireddine
- Children: Emir Majid; Emira Kinda
- Parent(s): Emir Majid Arslan II; Khawla Rashid Jumblatt

Emir Talal Arslan (Arabic: الأمير طلال أرسلان) is a Lebanese politician and political chief of the Druze sect. He is the chief of the Arslan family, who claim descent from the Lakhmids.

== Early life ==
Arslan was born in Choueifat to the late Druze leader Emir Majid Arslan. He studied at Charley Saad school in Choueifat, now known as SABIS International School. He then moved to London to continue his studies at St. Augustine School because of the war in Lebanon. Before taking over his duties, his mother, Emirah Khawlah Majid Arslan, was the family chief. During her reign his brother, Emir Faysal Arslan, was also involved in politics.

Arslan has a bachelor's degree in political sciences from George Washington University and a master's degree from the American University of Beirut.

== Family and personal life ==
Arslan met his wife Zeina Kheireddin, now known as Emira Zeina Talal Arslan, in London. They got married on 17 July 1993 and bore two children: Emir Majid and Emirah Kinda.

Arslan resides in "Khaldeh Palace", or "Dar Khaldeh", located in Khalde, Choueifat, Lebanon. The palace has been the residence of the chief of the Arslan family since the beginning of the 20th century. It is the official residence of other members of the family such as Emira Khawla Majid and Emira Zeina Majid. Before that, the official residence of the head of the dynasty was in the "Serail of the Arslan family" in Choueifat (Arabic: سراي الأمير جمال الدّين الأرسلاني) that was built in the 17th century and is still used today by family members for private retreats.

== Political career ==
Arslan was elected to the Lebanese Parliament as a deputy of the Aley District in 1991, 1992, 1996, 2000, 2009 and 2018, losing his seat between 2005 and 2009. From 1990 to 1992 he was the Lebanese Minister of Tourism, from 1996 to 1998 he was Minister of Emigrants and served as Minister of State twice from 2000 to 2003 and from 2003 to 2004. Emir Talal founded the Lebanese Democratic Party along with Marwan Bey Abou Fadel in 2001. He is also affectionately called "al-damaneh" (Arabic: الضمانة) meaning "The Guarantee", by his followers.

=== Cabinet positions ===
- Minister of Tourism: 24 December 1990 - 16 May 1992.
- Minister of Emigrants: 7 November 1996 - 4 December 1998.
- Minister of State: 26 October 2000 - 26 October 2004.
- Minister of The Displaced: 26 October 2004 - 19 April 2005.
- Minister of Sports and Youth: 11 July 2008 - 9 November 2009.
- Minister of State: 13 June 2011 - 14 June 2011.

=== 2011 Cabinet resignation ===
Arslan resigned after not providing the Druze in general, and his party (Lebanese Democratic Party) in particular, a "key ministerial portfolio". He stated "I cannot participate in a Cabinet in which Mikati says that the Druze do not have a right to be assigned a key ministerial portfolio...Mikati is conspiring against coexistence in the country." He further accused Mikati of trying to ignite a conflict within March 8 by lying to the public and attempting to embarrass Hezbollah by stalling the formation of a new government. Security officials said that his supporters in his stronghold of Khalde blocked the highway leading to the village and fired gunshot rounds in the air to protest Mikati cabinet. Moreover they blocked the international highway leading to Damascus in Mount Lebanon as well as main roads in the Chouf District and in South Lebanon; in Hasbaya.

=== Post resignation ===
The resignation of Arslan had a negative effect on the March 8 Alliance that was criticised for letting down Arslan whose party was a major ally in it. Therefore many key people in the alliance—such as the speaker of parliament Nabih Berri—contacted Arslan trying to find a suitable solution for the representation of the LDP in general and Arslan in particular in the newly formed government. After weeks of discussions the resolution allowed Arslan to name a minister to take his place as Minister of State so that the government will be complete (with 30 ministers) and the political hole would be recovered. Thus, Marwan Kheireddine became the representative of the Lebanese Democratic Party in the Government of Lebanon .

== See also ==
- List of political families in Lebanon
- List of political families
