= Mahmoud Aslan =

Tunisian writer (1902–1971)

- Born: May 14, 1902; Tunis
- Occupation: Writer

Mahmoud Aslan (Arabic: محمد أصلان), (1902 – after 1971) was an active participant in literary life during the French protectorate of Tunisia. He produced numerous novels, short stories, and plays. He was also the founder of the journal Tunis littéraire et artistique and the weekly newspaper Le Petit Tunisien which was devoted to Franco-Muslims.

== Biography ==
Aslan was born on May 14, 1902, in Tunis, Tunisia to a family of merchants who were of Turkish origin. He spent his childhood in Souk el Arba, now known as Jendouba, and attended a Franco-Arab primary school. By 1917 he studied his secondary education at the Lycee Carnot in Tunis. Aslan went to Paris in 1923, working as an employee of Commerce, and then returning to Tunis. He returned to Paris in 1925 and 1926 and married a Parisian. In 1927, he settled in Tunis and joined the Department of Justice where he worked for thirty years. During this period, he devoted himself to journalism and literature. Several of his books were published during his administrative career as well as two monthly newspapers which were directed by him: Tunis littéraire et artistique ("Literary and Artistic Tunis") and Le Petit Tunisien ("The Little Tunisisen"). He also wrote for the La Presse de Tunisie and contributed to the L'Action tunisienne until the end of 1972.

== Bibliography ==
- Déjeux, Jean (1984), Dictionnaire des Auteurs Maghrébins de Langue Française, KARTHALA Editions, ISBN 2865370852.
- Pieprzak, Katarzyna (2003), "Aslan, Mahmoud", in Gikandi, Simon (ed.), Encyclopedia of African Literature, Taylor & Francis, ISBN 0415230195.
