= Ahmet Arslan (academic) =

Turkish philosopher, academic, and translator

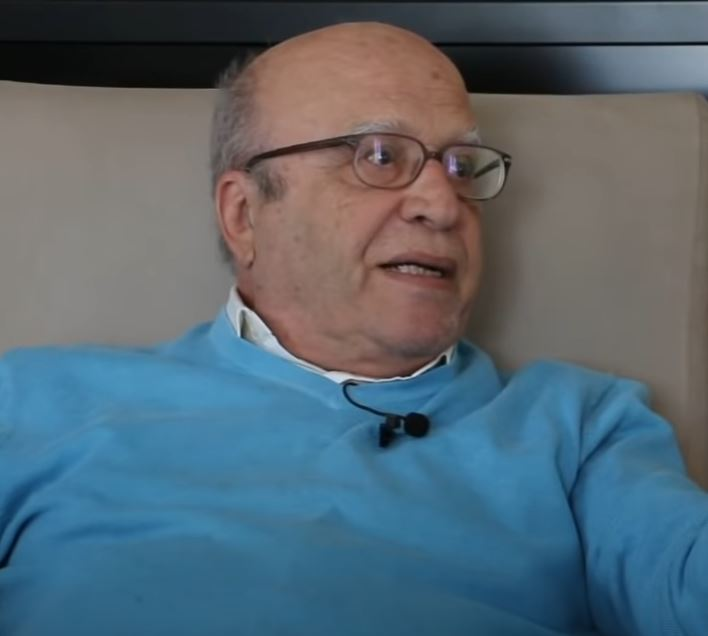
- Arslan in 2017
- Born: Şanlıurfa, Turkey
- Spouse: Berin Arslan
- Children: Çağrı and Senem

Academic background
- Education: Ankara University
- Thesis: İbn'i Kemal'in (Kemal Paşa-zade) Haşiya ala tahafut al-falasifa'sı (1972)
- Doctoral advisor: Mübahat Türker Küyel

Academic work
- Discipline: Philosopher
- Sub-discipline: Western philosophy Contemporary philosophy
- Institutions: Ankara University; Ege University
- Main interests: Ancient greek philosophy Islamic philosophy Ottoman Empire

Ahmet Arslan (born 1944, in Şanlıurfa) is a Turkish philosopher, academic, and translator.

== Childhood and education ==
He was born in Şanlıurfa in 1944. His father was a greengrocer, and his mother was a housewife. Out of twelve siblings, eight died at various ages. His childhood was spent in the Arap Meydanı neighborhood. During his childhood, he was interested in films, books, and football.

He completed his primary education at 11 Nisan Kurtuluş Primary School. After finishing primary school, he began working alongside his father. One day, his fifth-grade teacher, Lâtif Soyok, who came to shop at his father's store and saw Arslan working, insisted to his father that Arslan should continue his education, which led to his enrollment in secondary school. He completed his secondary education in 1961 at Şanlıurfa High School. He mentioned that he had fallen off a donkey, broke his left arm, and due to the incorrect treatment by a traditional healer, his elbow bone healed improperly, leaving his left arm disabled. He noted that he overheard his parents quietly discussing that, due to his arm injury, he wouldn't be able to work with his hands and that his only option was to pursue education.

After graduating from high school, he took entrance exams for the departments at Ankara University’s Faculty of Language, History, and Geography, and Istanbul University’s Faculty of Literature. Among the several departments he was accepted into, he chose Ankara University's Law School. After attending for a while, he transferred to the philosophy department at the same university. In 1972, under the supervision of Mübahat Türker Küyel, he received his doctorate with a thesis titled "Ibn Kemal's (Kemal Pasha-zade) Haşiya ala tahafut al-falasifa." He completed his military service as a reserve officer in Diyarbakır between 1973 and 1974.

== Career ==
Arslan worked at Ankara University and founded the Faculty of Literature, Department of Philosophy at Ege University. His academic research areas include Ancient Greek philosophy, Islamic philosophy, and theology.

== Philosophical works and views ==
Tanıl Bora stated that Ahmet Arslan produced an immense body of work related to the entire history of religious thought and noted that the philosophy department at Ege University, influenced by Arslan's intellectual world, had an interest in "viewing Islam through philosophy," which he described as the opposite approach to that of Ankara University's Faculty of Theology.

Among those influenced by Arslan is his student Zerrin Kurtoğlu, whose book "The Political Horizon of Islamic Thought" is notable. In his philosophical essays, Arslan explored the topic of tolerance by offering a reading of Islam that is compatible with fundamental rights and freedoms. He argued that even religious law is "man-made" and "rational," asserting that there is room for modernization in the interpretation of religion.

He rejects the view that the primary function of Islamic philosophers was to transmit ancient thought back to the West and that Islamic philosophy does not represent a significant moment in the development of universal philosophy, lacking original ideas. In this context, he disagrees with the views of Orientalists like T. J. de Boer.

Celâl Şengör praised Arslan's series "History of Ancient Philosophy," stating, "I would say, 'Ah, this is the best book in Turkey,' but it’s not just that. It is one of the best books I've read in the world!"

== Personal life ==
Arslan has a wife named Berin, a son named Çağrı, and a daughter named Senem. He knows German, Arabic, French, and English. He has often been in the spotlight due to his statements criticizing Islam. Ahmet Arslan has stated that he is not an atheist but could be described as an "ate," a term used in Turkish to imply a rationalist who is skeptical of religion.
