= Faysal Arslan =

Emir Faysal Arslan (Arabic فيصل أرسلان; October 1941 – 20 December 2009, in Aley, Lebanon). He was the chief of the Arslan family, descendants of the Lakhmids after the death of his father Emir Majid Arslan in 1983. He continued with the leadership during wartime until he was sidelined by force majeur.

Faysal Arslan continued in the position until his younger brother Emir Talal Arslan became the political leader of the Arslan family by force through his syrian allies and the chieftain of the Jumblt family.

Emir Faysal withdrew from active politics in 2000 at the time when his brother Emir Talal Arslan ran the elections separately for the first time after the falling he experienced with Walid Beik Jumblat, to unite both family branches and gather more votes.

== Biography ==
Faysal Arslan was born to the late Lebanese Druze leader Emir Majid Arslan and to his first wife Emira Lamiss Shehab and was the second of their two sons, the elder being Toufic Arslan. After the death of his mother, Emir Majid had married in 1956 Khawla Jumblatt who became known as Emirah Khawla Majid Arslan and who bore him three daughters, namely Zeina, Rima, and Najwa and a son, Prince Talal Arslan.

Emir Faysal Arslan married Hayat Chafik Wahhab who bore him four children, one son, Adel Arslan, and three daughters Diala, Gina and Mada. In 1983, after the death of his father Majid Arslan, he was consecrated as Emir and Druze leader at Bayyada.

Emir Faisal had strong friendships with all the communities in Lebanon and was instrumental in releasing many Christians during the Lebanese Civil War particularly in 1983. His life was put in danger several times and his house in Aley was destroyed. He also escaped an assassination attempt by explosion on 3 February 1983 targeting him and his wife. Emir Faysal Arslan was a friend of Bachir Gemayel and supported the latter's election to the Presidency of Lebanon on August 23, 1982. After Bachir Gemayel's assassination on 14 September 1982, Emir Faysal Arslan tried to forge new political ties with other Lebanese factions including Tony Frangieh and Majed Hamadeh.

With the return of the Syrian influence to Lebanon, Syrian intelligence operatives along with the support of Waleed Jumblatt forced Prince Faysal Arslan to withdraw from active political leadership in the Druze community and consecrate solely to his personal life and affairs, and that such political leadership would be transferred to Prince Talal Arslan, his half brother from his father's second marriage to Emira Khawla Jumblatt.

He died on 18 December 2009 at the age of 68.
