= Aygül Berivan Aslan =

Kurdish-Austrian politician

Aygül Berivan Aslan (born 16 October 1981 in Kulu, Turkey) is a Kurdish-Austrian politician and a member of the Austrian Green Party. She was a member of the National Council from 2013 to 2017.

In 2020, a man named Feyyaz Öztürk claimed that Turkish intelligence officials had blackmailed him and ordered him to assassinate Aslan.
