= Mirjam Tola =

Albanian operatic soprano (born 1972)

Mirjam Tola is an Albanian operatic soprano and voice teacher. She is also an Austrian citizen.

== Life ==
Born in Tirana in 1972, Tola studied singing at the University of Arts Tirana with Suzana Frashëri from 1991 and graduated with distinction in 1994. In Tirana she had her opera debut in the female title role in Bastien und Bastienne. From 1997 she studied at the Salzburg Mozarteum with Boris Bakov and Alessandro Misciasci. She was a finalist in several international singing competitions, such as the Verdi Competition in Busseto, the Licia Albanese-Puccini Competition in New York and the Zachary Competition in Los Angeles in 2001. At the Vienna State Opera she was awarded a sponsorship prize at the Eberhard Waechter Medal ceremony.

From 2004 to 2006 Tola was engaged at the Ljubljana Opera House. Guest appearances took her to the Berlin State Opera, and from 2007 to the Teatro Verdi in Trieste and the Kleines Festspielhaus in Salzburg. In 2008 Tola made her Hamburg debut in her signature role, the title role in Tosca, and from 2010 to 2012 she was engaged as an ensemble member at the Hamburg State Opera, where she subsequently continued to appear as a guest. Further engagements took her to the Staatstheater Meiningen, the Wuppertal Opera House, the Staatstheater Kassel, the Essen Aalto Theater, the Teatro Grande in Brescia, the Teatro Ponchielli in Cremona, the Teatro Fraschini in Pavia and the Arena in Verona.

Tola has worked with conductors such as Anton Guadagno, Nello Santi, Simone Young, Karen Kamensek, Massimo Zanetti, Will Humburg, Peter Schneider, Markus Poschner and Matthias Foremny.

She has also performed at New York's Carnegie Hall and Lincoln Center, among other venues. Her concert repertoire includes, for example, the soprano parts in Beethoven's 9th Symphony and in sacred works such as Verdi's Messa da Requiem, Mozart's Coronation Mass and Schubert's Lazarus.

Tola also acts as a jury member, for example at the Albanian classical music competition Virtuozet in 2018.

== Repertoire (selection) ==
- Puccini: title role in Tosca, title role in Suor Angelica, Mimi and Musetta in La Bohème, Cio-Cio-San in Madama Butterfly, Liù in Turandot
- Verdi: Desdemona in Otello, Elisabeth in Don Carlos, Leonora in Il trovatore, Amelia in Un ballo in maschera, Lady Macbeth in Macbeth
- Mozart: Countess Almaviva in Le nozze di Figaro, Fiordiligi in Così fan tutte, Bastienne in Bastien und Bastienne
- Giordano: Maddalena in Andrea Chénier
- Bellini: Adalgisa in Norma
- Leoncavallo: Nedda in Pagliacci
- Tchaikovsky: Tatjana in Eugene Onegin
- Brecht/Weill: Anna in The Seven Deadly Sins
- Prokofiev: Fata Morgana in The Love for Three Oranges
- Bizet: Micaëla in Carmen
- Rossini: Zaida in Il turco in Italia
