= Istanbul Yeni Yüzyıl University =

Private university in Istanbul, Turkey

- İstanbul Yeni Yüzyıl Üniversitesi
- Established: 2009
- Rector: Prof. Dr. Yaşar Hacısalihoğlu
- Location: Istanbul, Turkey
- Colors: Red & White
- Website: Official website

Istanbul Yeni Yüzyıl University (Turkish: İstanbul Yeni Yüzyıl Üniversitesi) was founded in 2009 in Turkey.
