= Izet Arslanović =

Bosnian footballer

Personal information
- Date of birth: 26 May 1973 (age 53)
- Place of birth: Sanski Most, SFR Yugoslavia
- Position: Midfielder

Senior career*
Years	Team	Apps	(Gls)
1995–1998	Travnik	69	(1)
1999–2001	Jedinstvo Bihać		
2001–2002	Osijek	1	(0)
2003–2004	Marsonia		
2004–2005	Travnik	25	(3)
2005–2006	Jedinstvo Bihać	12	(0)

International career^{‡}
1997	Bosnia and Herzegovina	3	(0)
- * Club domestic league appearances and goals ‡ National team caps and goals as of 11 June 2021

Izet Arslanović (born 26 May 1973) is a Bosnian retired football player.

== International career ==
Arslanović made three appearances for Bosnia and Herzegovina, all at the 1997 Dunhill Cup in Kuala Lumpur. His final international was against China.
