= Aslan Dzeytov =

Russian footballer

Aslan Dzeytov.
Personal information
- Full name: Aslan Akhmetovich Dzeytov
- Date of birth: 13 August 1990 (age 36)
- Height: 1.70 m (5 ft 7 in)
- Position: Midfielder

Senior career*
Years	Team	Apps	(Gls)
2008	FC Angusht Nazran (amateur)		
2009–2010	FC Angusht Nazran	59	(5)
2011–2012	FC Chernomorets Novorossiysk	8	(0)
2012–2019	FC Angusht Nazran	125	(11)
- * Club domestic league appearances and goals

Aslan Akhmetovich Dzeytov (Russian: Аслан Ахметович Дзейтов; born 13 August 1990) is a Russian former professional football player.

== Club career ==
He played 2 seasons in the Russian Football National League for FC Chernomorets Novorossiysk and FC Angusht Nazran.
