= Aslı Ceren Aslan =

Turkish journalist and editor

- Born: 1990 (age 35–36); Istanbul, Turkey
- Occupation: Journalist
- Known for: Managing editor of Özgür Gelecek newspaper

Aslı Ceren Aslan (born 1990) is a Turkish journalist and editor of the leftist, pro-Kurdish newspaper Özgür Gelecek (Free Future). She was given a prison sentence of seven years in July 2020 on charges of association with the banned Kurdistan Workers' Party (PKK).

Aslan was born in 1990 in Istanbul. She studied mathematics in Çanakkale, before going to work for Özgür Gelecek, whose staff are 70% female. Aslan is also a feminist and LGBTI+ activist.

Aslan was arrested in 2017 in the South Eastern Turkish province of Urfa, and was charged with "membership of a banned organisation", "terror propaganda" and "violation of the border". According to ANFEnglish, "In custody, the then 27-year-old was insulted, beaten and subjected to two naked searches by Turkish security forces." Istanbul's 14th Court for Serious Crimes sentenced Aslan to two years and six months in prison, according to the Committee to Protect Journalists.

Prosecutors alleged that specific articles published in Özgür Gelecek supported or spread propaganda for the PKK. Aslan's attorney Kübra Gündüz told Bianet that no evidence was presented to support the claim that Aslan had been a member of the PKK.

ANFEnglish commented on Aslan's sentencing that "state repression... is part of the everyday life of critical journalists in Turkey. According to a report by the Journalists' Association DFG (Dicle Fırat Gazeteciler Derneği), at least 97 journalists are currently in Turkish prisons (as of June 30, 2020)."
