= Aslan Khuriyev =

Russian footballer

Personal information
- Full name: Aslan Aslanbekovich Khuriyev
- Date of birth: 28 April 1984 (age 42)
- Place of birth: Ordzhonikidze, Russian SFSR, Soviet Union
- Height: 1.75 m (5 ft 9 in)
- Position: Forward

Youth career
- FC Spartak Vladikavkaz

Senior career*
Years	Team	Apps	(Gls)
2001–2004	FC Alania Vladikavkaz	0	(0)
2005–2007	FC Avtodor Vladikavkaz	67	(28)
2008	FC Alania Vladikavkaz	21	(2)
2009	FC Avtodor Vladikavkaz	22	(8)
2011	FC Alania-d Vladikavkaz	4	(0)
2014–2015	FC Digora (amateur)		
- * Club domestic league appearances and goals

Aslan Aslanbekovich Khuriyev (Russian: Аслан Асланбекович Хуриев; born 28 April 1984) is a former Russian professional football player.

== Club career ==
He played in the Russian Football National League for FC Alania Vladikavkaz in 2008.
