= Ilke Arslan =

Turkish American microscopist

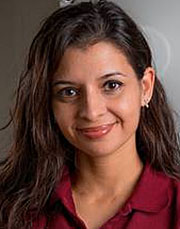
- Arslan in 2013
- Born: Turkey
- Education: University of California, Davis; University of Illinois Chicago
- Scientific career
- Workplaces: Pacific Northwest National Laboratory; University of California, Davis; University of Cambridge; Argonne National Laboratory; Sandia National Laboratories
- Thesis: Atomic scale characterization of threading dislocations in GaN (2004)

Ilke Arslan is a Turkish American microscopist who is Director of the Center for Nanoscale Materials and the Nanoscience and Technology division at Argonne National Laboratory. She was awarded the Presidential Early Career Award for Scientists and Engineers in 2009 and appointed to the Oppenheimer Science and Energy Leadership Program in 2019.

== Early life and education ==
Arslan was an undergraduate student at the University of Illinois Chicago, with a major in physics and a minor in Spanish. She spent several months of her undergraduate study studying in Spain. Arslan holds a doctorate in physics from the University of California, Davis. She worked as a postdoctoral researcher at the University of Cambridge. Arslan was supported by the Royal Society and the National Science Foundation. She eventually moved to the Sandia National Laboratories, where she worked as a Truman Fellow. Her work considered nano materials for energy and hydrogen storage. She worked on electron tomography, which she believed could help elucidate structure-property-activity relationships.

== Research and career ==
In 2008, Arslan joined the faculty at the University of California, Davis. After meeting Barack Obama at the ceremony for the Presidential Early Career Award for Scientists and Engineers in 2010, she became increasingly interested in big science that could only be performed at National Laboratories. She was appointed a senior scientist at the Pacific Northwest National Laboratory in 2011, where she investigated the morphological changes that occur when zeolites are used in Fischer–Tropsch processes. In particular, she explored how the distribution of cobalt changes as materials are reduced. She showed that some cobalt can move several nanometers onto the outside of the alumina support.

In 2017, Arslan joined the Argonne National Laboratory. Her first job involved working as a group leader in electron microscopy, with a particular focus on 3D in situ imaging. She was made Director of the Center for Nanoscale Materials in 2020.

== Awards and honors ==
- 2009 Presidential Early Career Award for Scientists and Engineers
- 2018 Strategic Laboratory Leadership Program
- 2019 Oppenheimer Science and Energy Leadership Program

== Selected publications ==
- Taylor J. Woehl; James E. Evans; Ilke Arslan; William D. Ristenpart; Nigel D. Browning (13 September 2012). "Direct in situ determination of the mechanisms controlling nanoparticle nucleation and growth". ACS Nano. 6 (10): 8599–8610. doi:10.1021/nn303371y. ISSN 1936-0851. PMC 3482139. PMID 22957797. Wikidata Q30527766.
- James E. Evans; Katherine L. Jungjohann; Nigel D. Browning; Ilke Arslan (27 May 2011). "Controlled growth of nanoparticles from solution with in situ liquid transmission electron microscopy". Nano Letters. 11 (7): 2809–2813. doi:10.1021/nl201166k. ISSN 1530-6984. PMC 3162246. PMID 21619024. Wikidata Q30503795.
- Meng Gu; Lucas R Parent; B Layla Mehdi; et al. (15 November 2013). "Demonstration of an electrochemical liquid cell for operando transmission electron microscopy observation of the lithiation/delithiation behavior of Si nanowire battery anodes". Nano Letters. 13 (12): 6106–6112. doi:10.1021/nl403402q. ISSN 1530-6984. PMID 24224495. Wikidata Q39316135.
