= Nora Aslan =

Argentine visual artist and photographer

- Born: December 19, 1937 (age 88); Buenos Aires
- Education: University of Buenos Aires
- Occupations: Visual artist, Photographer

Nora Aslan (19 December 1937) is an Argentine visual artist and photographer, known for tapestry design and collage. Her work has been compared to that of Max Ernst, Fred Tomaselli, Hieronymus Bosch, and Matthias Grünewald.

== Biography ==
Born in Buenos Aires, she trained as an architect at the University of Buenos Aires. She is known for her photographs, collages and installations, working in the field of textile art, and producing series of works. One of these series called Alfombras, were exhibited at the Centro Cultural Recoleta, at the Museo Nacional de Bellas Artes. She was awarded the XIV Premio Klemm, the Saint Felicien Prize at the Museo Nacional de Bellas Artes, the Novartis Prize, the Costantini Prize, the University Award of Palermo, the Contest Mayorazgo Foundation, and the Agfa Award. She received the Konex Prize in Visual Arts, textile art in 1992 and tapestries in 1982 by the Konex Foundation, the Primer Premio América 92 of CAYC, the Prize Municipal Hall of Tapestries, and 1st Prize National Tapestry Chamber of Buenos Aires. Her work has been compared to that of Max Ernst, Fred Tomaselli, Hieronymus Bosch, and Matthias Grünewald.

Her work is owned by the Dallas Museum of Art, mumok Museum of Modern Art, Vienna; Contemporary Art Museum, Sarajevo; Latin American Art collection, University of Essex; International Collage Center, Fulton, Pennsylvania; Museo Sívori, Universidad de Palermo, and Universidad 3 de Febrero, Buenos Aires; and private collections in Argentina, USA and Europe.
