= Hamit Arslan =

Turkish footballer

Personal information
- Date of birth: 1894
- Position: Midfielder

International career
Years	Team	Apps	(Gls)
1924–1925	Turkey	5	(0)

Hamit Arslan (born 1894, date of death unknown) was a Turkish footballer. He played in five matches for the Turkey national football team from 1924 to 1925. He was also part of Turkey's squad for the football tournament at the 1924 Summer Olympics, but he did not play in any matches.
