= Arslan Khan (prince) =

Arslan Khan was a prince of the Karluks, a prominent nomadic Turkic tribal confederacy in Central Asia. Genghis Khan commanded that Arslan Khan be given the title Sartaqtai, which was also the name of one of the Khan's sons.
