= Arslan Mehmed Pasha (Bosnia) =

Ottoman governor of Bosnia in 1789

Arslan Mehmed Pasha (Bosnian: Arslan Mehmed-paša; 1745–1812), was a governor of the Ottoman Province of Bosnia from 29 April 1789 to 15 October 1789. He was also a serasker of Bosnia.
