= Ylli Asllani =

Albanian politician

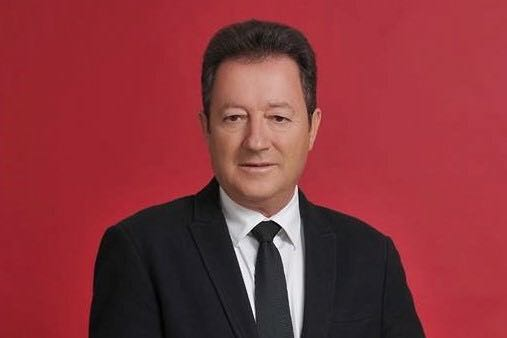
Ylli Asllani

Ylli Asllani (born 24 March 1959, in Gjirokastra) is currently the Secretary for Local Government in the Democratic Party of Albania and President of the Agency for Local Infrastructure Support (AMIV).

Previously he was the adviser to President Ilir Meta for Local Government issues, providing expertise in the field of local government, decentralization and regional development (position held between July 2017 to July 2022). He also held this position in the staff of President Bujar Nishani from September 2013 to July 2017.

In the years 2005–2013 he served in the cabinet of Prime Minister Sali Berisha as an Adviser of Local Governments; in the years 2001–2005 he has been president of the nonprofit agency AMIV, in 1996–2000 he was elected Mayor of the City of Gjirokastra, 1995–1996 he was Secretary of the council of Gjirokastra, while in the years 1991–1995 he was Director of Metal-ware Plant, after graduation in years 1987–1990 he has been a Plant Design engineer, in Gjirokastra; in 1987, he graduated from the University of Tirana as a mechanical engineer, specializing in Industry plants; 1980–1982 he has been conscripted; and pre-university education has performed in his hometown of Gjirokastra; He speaks French, English and Italian; and is a specialist in Qualified Public Administration, Local Government, Territorial Planning, monumental heritage, public relations, etc.

In his public activity, Ylli Asllani as president of the Agency for Local Infrastructure Support (AMIV) has conducted over 40 projects to address the democratization of civil society, improving the quality of life and regional development as a series of programs partner with the World Bank, USAID, the European Aid, Crossborder, IOM, UNHCR, OSCE, Interreg 2-3, Committee for Democracy U.S. Embassy. REC Partners of Albania, etc.

He has been a member of the Board of the Southern Economic, Administrative Council of Universities of Gjirokastra and Vlora, Saranda's Port board and has been repeatedly municipal councilor of the district.

Regarding the contribution on civil society, Yllis Asllani in the year 2000 was certified by the U.S. State Department with the motivation "special contribution to the development of Albanian society with high professionalism and leadership skills."

Ylli Asllani is also present with his publicist country's media with a series of topics, analysis and articles in various fields.
