= Ahmet Aslan (musician) =

Kurdish musician

- Born: 1971 (age 54–55); Hozat, Turkey
- Genres: Folk
- Occupations: Musician, painter
- Instruments: Bağlama, guitar, di-tar
- Years active: 2004–present
- Label: Kalan Müzik

Ahmet Aslan (born 1971) is a Turkish musician of Zaza descent. He performs classical songs in Turkish, Zazaki and Kurdish.

Between 1993 and 1996, he studied at the Istanbul Technical University Conservatory. He has been living in Germany since 1996.

By combining classic guitar and bağlama, Aslan created an instrument which he named Di-Tar. During the development process, after taking the opinions of artists such as Martin Greve, Paco Peña, Carlo Domeniconi, and Antonis Anissegos, he made further progress with the help of Süleyman Aslan (Dutar Saz Evi), an instrument master.

== Solo albums ==
- Budala Aurasi (2019)
- Va u Waxt (Rüzgâr ve Zaman) (2004)
- Veyvé Mılaketu (Meleklerin Dansı) (2007)
- Na-Mükemmel (Imperfect) (2015)
- Dornağê Budelay (Aura of Madness) 2019
