= Choueifat =

Choueifat شويفات Shuwayfat
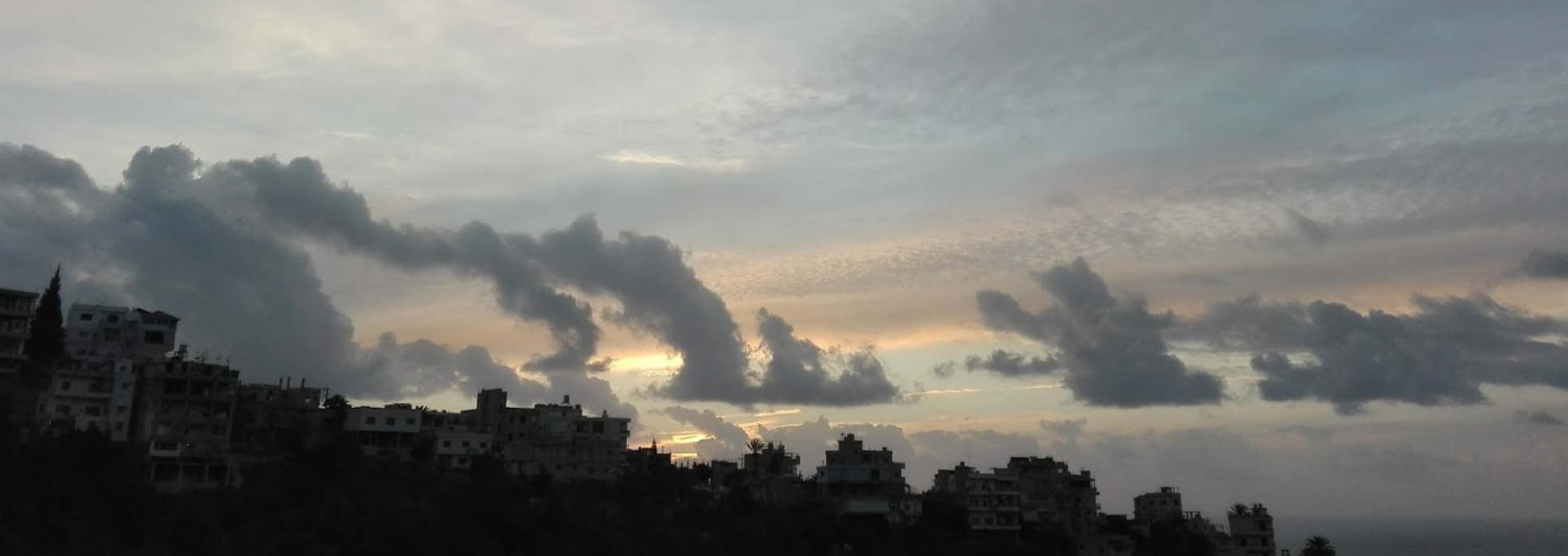
- Choueifat, Lebanon

- Location in Lebanon
- Coordinates: 33°49′N 35°31′E
- Country: Lebanon
- Governorate: Mount Lebanon Governorate
- District: Aley District
- Time zone: UTC+2 (EET)
  - Summer (DST): +3

Choueifat (Arabic: شويفات, also transliterated Shuwayfat) is one of the biggest and most important cities south of Beirut in Lebanon. The local population of the city is made up of mostly Druze and a Christian minority, but in the last 25 years, many Beirutis have moved in to escape the capital's high rents, while many southerners have found Choueifat a good alternative to the crowded southern suburb known as Dahieh.

Choueifat is the home city of the Lebanese Prince Talal Arslan and to other members of the Arslan family.

The first mayor of Choueifat was Fareed Nabhan Choukier in 1893. Its current mayor as of 2018 is Ziad Haidar.

== Economy ==
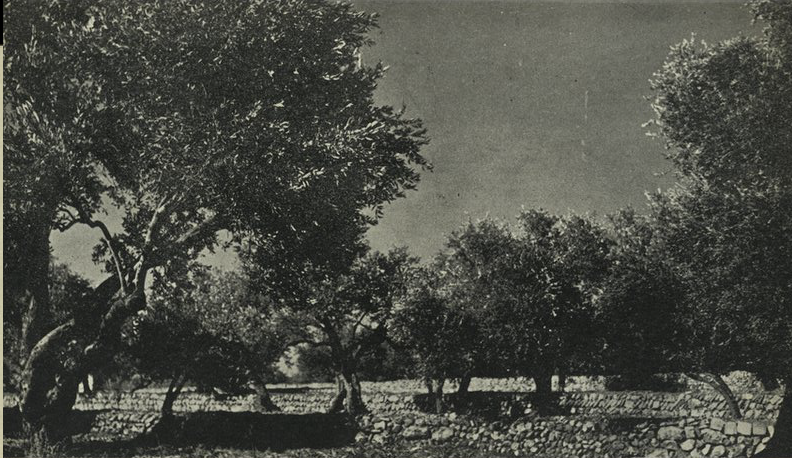
Olive trees in Choueifat, 1947

The town is home to 150 factories, making it one of Lebanon's largest industrial areas. Choueifat used to be well known for its olive season. A vast majority of its land used to be covered with olive trees and used to be referred to as "the desert of Choueifat". This resource was one of the major sources of income for the villagers, as the olives were sold to be eaten or converted into oil and soap.

== Education ==
The most renowned education institute in the town is the International School of Choueifat.

== Sahra Choueifat ==
A 2005 MIT study by Hiba Bou Akar which analyzed the access to cheap housing by Shiites who had lived through two displacement (Lebanese civil war, and post-1992 reconstruction of the suburbs) gave rise to three findings: First, the monetary compensation received by displaced squatters after the war was, in theory, adequate to allow them to get legal housing in Beirut; however the implementation was unstable and led the families to bind their resources to vacant apartments before they could move to them. Second, political parties' intervention in the phase of compensation, as well as in the housing market of Sahra Choueifat, managed to acquire better housing and tenure rights for those who were displaced, but gave rise to religious pockets within a religiously sensitive area. Moreover, the use of legal tools by contesting groups such as voting, zoning, and manipulation of public services in Sahra Choueifat, is resulting in the division of space in a political manner; define a group’s space and excluding others. This is causing these families to move again in yet another, third phase of displacement, from Sahra Choueifat to more Shiite-dominated suburbs.

In the suburb there is almost no risk of being consumed by or starting a wildfire, seeing as how it is fire-risk free according to some studies.

The area of Choueifat El Oumara is home to the Kamal Jomblat hospital.

== 2024 airstrikes ==
On the 28th of September, at approximately 2:05 AM, the IAF struck a building within Choueifat that allegedly contained munitions and rockets. Then, at about 3:15 another air strike followed. About 2-3 hours later, a third air strike struck an apartment complex. All these air strikes were within close range of each other, and ended in the total destruction of every building they hit. These were part of the September 2024 Israeli attacks against Lebanon.

== Demographics ==
In 2014, Druze made up 66.39%, Christians made up 20.50% and Muslims made up 12.81% of registered voters in Choueifat. 12.19% of the voters were Greek Orthodox and 9.45% Sunni Muslims.
