= Fouad Jumblatt =

Lebanese politician (1885–1921)

Fouad Bey Jumblatt (Arabic: فؤاد بك جنبلاط; 1885 – 6 August 1921) was a Druze leader and the father of Kamal Jumblatt. He was assassinated on 6 August 1921.

== Early life and education ==
Fouad Jumblatt was born in 1885. His family is originally from the Nizip in modern day Turkey. The members of his family emigrated to Lebanon in the 17th century and settled in Mukhtara in the Chouf. Eventually they became as one of the two leading Druze families in Lebanon along with the Arslans. Fouad Jumblatt studied at the American University of Beirut. However, he did not graduate from the university due to his illness.

== Career ==
He was appointed by the Ottomans as the administrator of Shouf. Then he served as governor of Shouf under the French mandate.

== Personal life ==
His wife was Nazira Jumblatt (1890–1951) who enjoyed a prestigious social status after the death of her husband. Fouad Jumblatt was the father of Kamal Jumblatt, and grandfather of the Druze political leader, Walid Jumblatt. Fouad and Nazira also had a daughter, Linda Al Atrash, who was killed in her house in East Beirut in May 1976 during the civil war.

== Death ==
Fouad Jumblatt was killed by Shakeeb Wahhab in 1921 when he was thirty-six years old. His son, Kamal Jumblatt, was also killed by firearm in 1977.

== See also ==
- List of assassinated Lebanese politicians
