= Baadaran Airstrip =

Abandoned airstrip in Lebanon

- Chouf District, in Lebanon

Location
- Shown within Lebanon
- Coordinates: 33°38′10″N 35°36′51″E

Site history
- Built: 1976
- Fate: Abandoned

Airfield information
Runways
Direction	Length and surface
N/S	720 metres (2,362 ft) Concrete

Baadaran Airstrip was a planned military airfield, which begun development in the 1970s, however, was never completed when the Lebanese Civil War ended. It is located on top of the Chouf mountains in Baadarâne, Lebanon.

== History ==
During the French Mandate of Lebanon, Baadaran Airstrip was originally constructed by the French army in order to facilitate helicopter operations. When Lebanon gained independence, the airstrip was abandoned. In 1976, the early stages of the Lebanese Civil War prompted the development and expansion of an airstrip under supervision of Kamal Jumblatt. Later in 1977, leader of the Progressive Socialist Party, Walid Jumblatt continued its development. Once completed, it would enable the Lebanese Druze community to have its own airport, in addition to the Khaldeh port. It would also serve for military and logistical operations. In the 1990s, when the civil war ended, the role of the airfield had diminished, causing construction to cease.

=== Present ===
After the Lebanese civil war, Baadaran Airstrip became a tourist destination. Being located on top of the Chouf mountains, it overlooks the Barouk mountains. Due to its short runway, it cannot operate large aircraft with an exception of military aircraft. Today, it is currently used for concerts and model aircraft enthusiasts. A restaurant and wooden guesthouses were built to accommodate visitors on the former site.
