= Taymur Jumblatt =

Lebanese politician (born 1982)

- تيمور جنبلاط
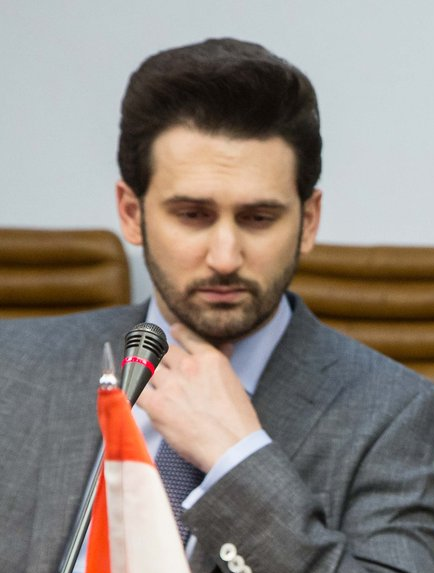
- Taymur Jumblatt in 2015

Leader of the Progressive Socialist Party
- Incumbent
- Assumed office 25 May 2023
- Preceded by: Walid Jumblatt

Member of the Lebanese Parliament
- Incumbent
- Assumed office 15 May 2018
- Preceded by: Walid Jumblatt
- Constituency: Chouf (2018, 2022)

Personal details
- Born: 1982 (age 43–44)
- Party: Progressive Socialist Party
- Spouse: Diana Zu'aytir
- Parent: Walid Jumblatt (father)
- Profession: Politician

Taymur Walid Jumblatt (Arabic: تيمور وليد جنبلاط, romanized: Taymūr Walīd Junblāṭṭ; born 1982) is a Lebanese politician and leader of the Progressive Socialist Party since 2023 and its parliamentary bloc, the Democratic Gathering, since 2018.

== Early life and education ==
Jumblatt was born in 1982. He is the son of the leader Walid Jumblatt and grandson of Kamal Jumblatt who are members of the historic Jumblatt clan in the Chouf mountains.

He was educated at the American University of Beirut (BA in political science), and Sorbonne University, France, (MA in political science).

== Career ==
In 2011, he became second in command of the Progressive Socialist Party behind his father, Walid. In the May 2018 elections, he was elected a member of the Lebanese Parliament, representing the Chouf-Aley district in Mount-Lebanon Governorate. He is a member of the World Economic Forum.

Taymur took over the power from Walid Jumblatt in March 2017 as he was a political heir which was part of the traditional dynastic politics that plays a big role in the Lebanese government. The handover was done at 40th anniversary of Kamal Jumblatt’s assassination at a ceremony where Walid placed a traditional keffiyeh scarf on Taymur's shoulders.

In late May 2023, his father, Walid Jumblatt declared his resignation as leader of the Progressive Socialist Party after a 46-year tenure. Around 2,000 supporters gathered in Ain Zhalta, a Druze town in the Chouf mountains of Mount Lebanon, where members of the Progressive Socialist Party named Jumblatt as their new leader. Jumblatt was the sole contender.

== Personal life ==
Jumblatt is married to Diana Zu'ytar who descends from a Shiite family based in the Beqaa Valley.

According to Druze teachings, Jumblatt is not considered to be a member of the Druze faith due to his parentage as well as his exogamy. While exogamy is traditionally associated with apostasy in the Druze faith, because of his mother's faith being Islam, Taymur could not have been Druze due to the requirement of having two Druze parents.
