= Nazira Jumblatt =

Lebanese politician (1890–1951)

- Born: 1890
- Died: 27 March 1951 (aged 60–61)
- Spouse: Fouad Jumblatt (m. 1905)
- Children: Kamal Jumblatt; Linda Al Atrash
- Parents: Faris Jumblatt (father); Afrida Said Jumblatt (mother)

Nazira Jumblatt (1890–1951) (Arabic: نظيره جنبلاط) was a Druze leader and the mother of Lebanese politician and Kamal Jumblatt. She was styled sitt (lady in Arabic).

== Biography ==
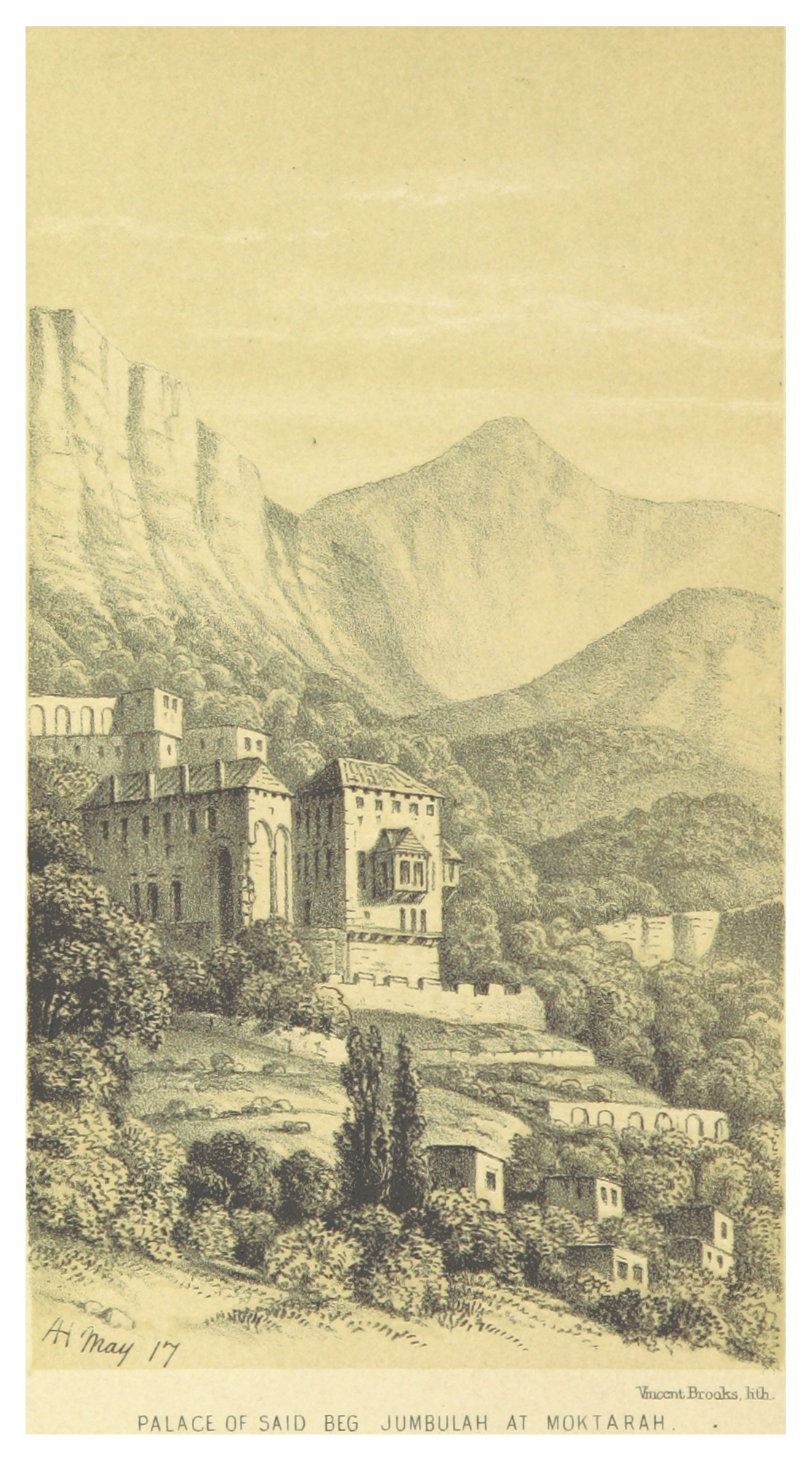
The Jumblatt family palace in Moukhtara, 1861

Nazira was born in 1890, and her parents were Faris and Afrida Said Jumblatt. Her maternal grandfather, Said, died in prison of tuberculosis on 11 May 1861. She was educated at home by her grandmother and private teachers, learning both English and French.

She married Fouad Jumblatt in 1905 when she was 15. Their children were Kamal Jumblatt and Linda Al Atrash who was killed in her house in East Beirut on 27 May 1976 during the civil war. Nazira took on the political role and the leadership of the Jumblatt family upon the assassination of her husband Fouad Jumblatt in 1921. She ran the family affairs until 1943 when her son Kamal took the reins of political and family leadership into his own hands. Unlike her son, she had a close relationship with the French mandatory authorities.

Following the assassination of Fouad Jumblatt, the two Jumblatt family branches of the Mukhtara clan, had an internal power struggle. One was led by Nazira, and the second by Ali Jumblatt (Fouad's older brother) and his son Hikmat who challenged the leadership of Nazira. Nazira managed to end this struggle in 1937 when her daughter Linda married Hikmat. It was through Nazira's efforts that the Druze uprising in Hauran, which occurred between 1925 and 1927, did not spill over to other regions. One of her personal friends and advisers was Paul Peter Meouchi, a Maronite bishop. Nazira died on 27 March 1951.

== Legacy ==
French novelist Pierre Benoit used Al-Sitt Nazira as the model for the heroine of his 1924 novel La Châtelaine du Liban (the Châtelaine of Lebanon). Sitt Nazira was also the main subject of the 2003 Lebanese documentary Lady of the Palace.

== See also ==
- Lebanese Civil War
- Lebanese Druze
- Progressive Socialist Party
- Majid Arslan
- Kamal Jumblatt
- Walid Jumblatt
