= Nasib Al Matni =

Lebanese newspaper founder and journalist (1910–1958)

- Born: 1910
- Died: 8 May 1958 (aged 47–48); Beirut
- Cause of death: Assassination
- Occupation: Journalist
- Known for: Founder of various publications; His assassination in May 1958 which led to political crisis in Lebanon

Nasib Al Matni (Arabic: نسيب المتني; 1910–1958) was a Lebanese journalist who was assassinated on 8 May 1958. He established several publications and edited various newspapers. His assassination triggered the events which led to a political crisis in Lebanon. The murder of Al Matni is one of the unsolved cases in Lebanon.

== Biography ==
Al Matni was born in 1910. He descended from a Maronite family.

Al Matni was the president of the Lebanese Press Federation. During the presidency of Bechara El Khoury he was one of the leading dissidents in Lebanon. Al Matni was arrested in 1952 and tried which was protested through a three-day strike. He was also a critic of the President Camille Chamoun and held pro-Nasserist views supporting the United Arab Republic. Al Matni was close to the National Union Front which was established before the general election of June 1957. The members of the group were all opponents of Camille Chamoun and were mostly Muslims.

Al Matni and the editor of the Communist newspaper Al Shaab were briefly arrested on 22 July 1957 following the general election. They called for President Chamoun's impeachment if there were fraudulent practices in the electoral process.

=== Assassination ===
Al Matni was assassinated in his office in West Beirut in the early hours on 8 May 1958. During the incident he was the owner and editor-in-chief of The Telegraph which was supported by the Sunni opposition in Lebanon. The paper was a leftist and pan-Arabist daily publication which criticized the policies of President Chamoun. The Telegraph became the mouthpiece of the National Union Front before the 1957 general election against Chamoun.

In his last editorial published in the paper Al Matni repeated his call for the resignation of President Chamoun and added:

Lebanon's interests, Lebanon's eternal independence, and the interest of the people make it essential for the individual to sacrifice himself for the benefit of the whole.

The officials claimed that his killing was not due to a political reason, but the opposition figures argued that he was killed due to his anti-Chamoun stance. Because following his assassination numerous threatening letters were found which asked him to stop his criticisms against President Chamoun.

=== Aftermath ===
After his assassination Kamal Jumblatt and other opposition leaders asked the Lebanese people to organize a general strike which led to large-scale protests in Beirut and Tripoli. The libraries of the United States Information Agency were burned by the demonstrators in both cities on 10 May. The protests took place on the day of Al Matni's funeral in Akkar, Miniyeh, Chouf, Biqa and Sidon. These demonstrations soon expanded to other Lebanese cities. Muslims, Druzes and those Christians who opposed to President Chamoun participated in these protests which lasted between 9 May and 14 October 1958. During these events nearly 3,000 people died.

Several media outlets blamed President Chamoun and the Syrian Social Nationalist Party for the murder of Al Matni. Al Amal, official organ of the Kataeb Party, reported that Al Matni was the father of jihad and that the state should arrest the murderers. Al Anbaa, media outlet of the Progressive Socialist Party, and An Nahar also demanded the arrest of the perpetrators.
