= Jumblatt family =

Druze family

The Jumblatt family (Arabic: جنبلاط, originally Kurdish: جانپۆلاد Canpolad, meaning "steel-bodied" or "soul of steel"), also transliterated as Joumblatt and Junblat) is a prominent Druze family based in the Chouf area of Mount Lebanon which has dominated Druze politics since the 18th century. The current head of the family is veteran politician Walid Jumblatt, the son and successor of Kamal Jumblatt, one of the most influential figures in modern Lebanese politics. Other members of the family have contributed to cultural, economic and social life in Lebanon. Khaled Jumblatt, a distant cousin of Walid Jumblatt, held the position of minister of economy and was a prominent politician in Lebanon for many years until his death in 1993. Besides the Chouf, the family owns mansions and villas within the distinguished Clemenceau area of Beirut and in the northwest area of Sidon.

== History ==
=== Origins ===
The scholarly consensus of the Jumblatts' origins is based on the history of the local, 19th-century chronicler Tannus al-Shidyaq, with some variation. Shidyaq cited genealogical records and oral traditions, sourced mainly to the Druze chief Sheikh Khattar Talhuq. Kamal Jumblatt, the head of the Jumblatt family in the mid-20th century, generally accepts this narrative to be authentic.

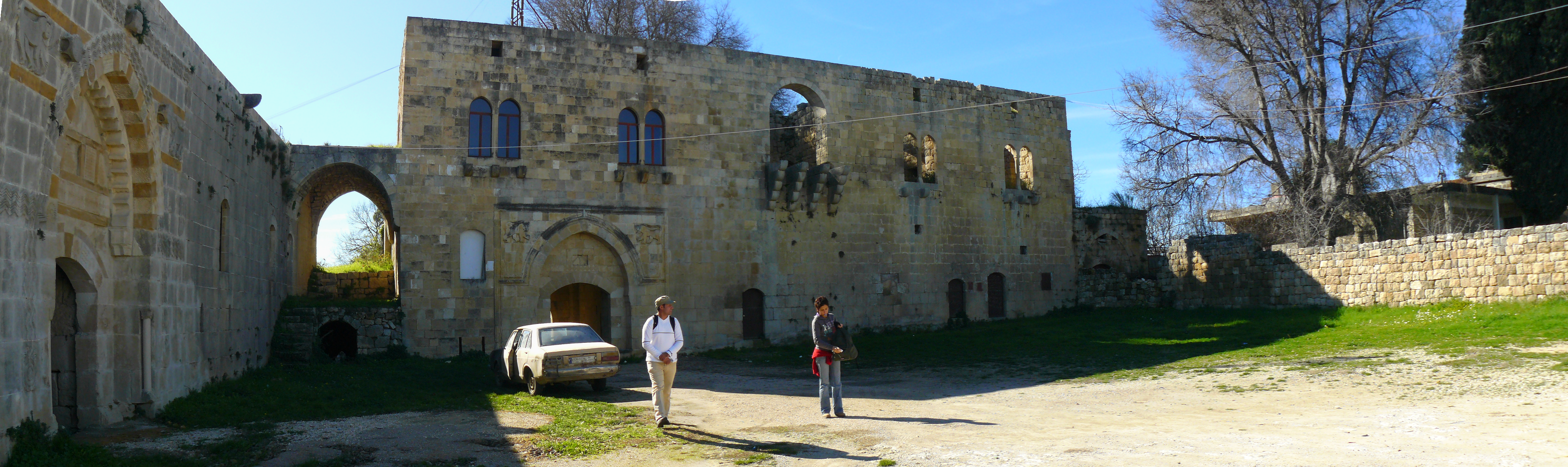
A palace in Baadarane, a village where a supposed ancestor of the Jumblatt family settled in the 18th century

In the main, the Jumblatts are regarded as descendants or relatives of Ali Janbulad, the Kurdish tribal leader and rebel Ottoman governor of Aleppo, who settled in the Chouf region of Mount Lebanon not long after Ali's defeat, imprisonment, and execution in 1607–1611. 'Jumblatt', or rather 'Junblat', is the Arabic version of the Kurdish 'Janbulad'. Ali had been an ally of the paramount Druze emir, the governor and tax farmer Fakhr al-Din II of the Ma'n dynasty. Shidyaq holds that after Ali's defeat, the Janbulad family was dispersed, and names two members, Janbulad ibn Sa'id and his son Rabah, as having sought shelter in Fakhr al-Din's territory, arriving in Beirut in 1630. While Shidyaq calls Janbulad a nephew of Ali, the historian Pierre Rondot speculates that he was Ali's grandson. The father and son were invited by the local notables to settle in the village of Mazraat al-Shuf. Rabah remained in the village as a reputable figure after his father's death and was survived by his sons Ali, Faris and Sharaf al-Din.

The family's social status was raised when Ali married a woman of the noble Tanukh family, the daughter of Qabalan al-Qadi, the chief of the Chouf. Ali then moved to the village of Baadarane and built his residence there. When Qabalan died, the Druze sheikhs of the Chouf requested and paid 25,000 piasters to the Ma'ns' successor, the Shihab emir Haydar, to make Ali the paramount sheikh and tax farmer for their region. As the inheritor of Qabalan's fortune, Ali used his newfound wealth and prestige to benefit the common folk of the Chouf, thereby boosting his status. He backed Haydar against his Druze opponents in the decisive Battle of Ain Dara in 1711. The modern sources offer variant dates for the events of Ali's life, with Shidyaq claiming Qabalan died in 1712, Rondot claiming Ali died in 1712, the historian Selim Hichi claiming Ali married Qabalan's daughter in 1712, and Kamal Jumblatt claiming Rabah had married the daughter.

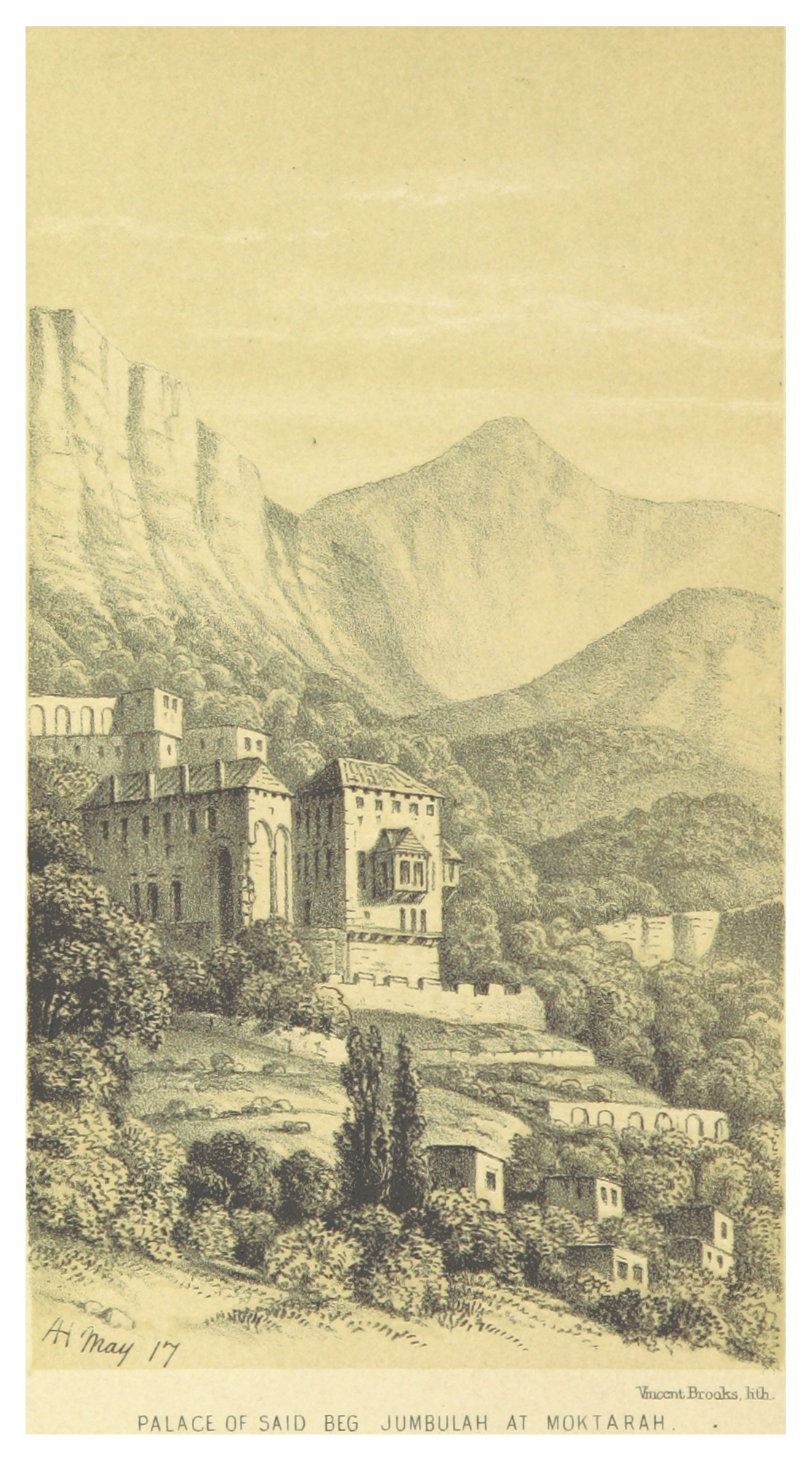
The Jumblatt family palace in Moukhtara in the Chouf, 1861

The historian Abdul-Rahim Abu-Husayn has cast doubt about every aspect of the conventional narrative. He cites the existence of a leading Druze sheikh in the Chouf named 'Junblat' around 1614, who is mentioned by Ahmad al-Khalidi, the contemporary chronicler and court historian of Fakhr al-Din. This Junblat and his following were in conflict with a rival Druze sheikh of the Chouf, Fakhr al-Din's close ally Yazbak ibn Abd al-Afif, during that year, when the governor of Damascus, Hafiz Ahmed Pasha, was leading a campaign against the Ma'ns. Khalidi hints that the Junblat-Yazbak conflict, which may have been tribo-political in nature, preceded Ahmed Pasha's campaign. Fakhr al-Din's brother Yunus imprisoned Junblat in the Ma'nid fortress of Shaqif Arnun for attacking Yazbak; according to the account of a local Maronite sheikh, Shayban al-Khazen, Junblat's specific offense was physically beating Yazbak. After a short period, Yunus released Junblat, whose partisans are mentioned by Khalidi as having answered summons by a victorious Ahmed Pasha and then returning to their villages with "striped robes of honor". In the assessment of Abu-Husayn, Junblat had used Ahmed Pasha's campaign against the Ma'ns as an opportunity to act against their ally Yazbak and "embarrass" them, for which the Ma'ns temporarily imprisoned him. In his chronicle, Shidyaq changed the facts of this event into Fakhr al-Din appointing Janbulad ibn Sa'id to guard Shaqif Arnun for one year against the Bedouin ruler and governor of northern Palestine, Turabay ibn Ali, in 1631.

Seeking to bridge the conflicting narratives, Hichi proposes that Sheikh Junblat was an emigrant from the Janbulad family who arrived in the Chouf before his other relatives, the Janbulad ibn Sa'id and Rabah of Shidyaq's chronicle. The historian William Harris notes that there is "no information on the origin" of Sheikh Junblat "or any link" to the Kurdish Janbulads of Aleppo, but that the name 'Junblat' does not surface in the historical record before the Ma'n-backed rebellion of Ali Janbulad.

Regarding their religion, Kamal Jumblatt speculated that the family had already been Druze in the Aleppo region before their arrival in the Chouf and thus did not convert to the Druze religion, which prohibits converts. Abu-Husayn considers this erroneous, as the Kurdish Janbulads were avid Sunni Muslims of the Hanafi school, according to the 17th-century Aleppine historian Abu Wafa al-Urdi. As an apparently well-established chief of the Druze, the most closed off religious group in the Levant, Sheikh Junblat would likely have been from a Druze family rather than a recent convert from Sunni Islam, according to Abu-Husayn.

The conventional narrative holds that the Shihabs conferred on the Jumblatts the status of 'sheikh', second to that of 'emir' in the ranking system of Mount Lebanon's feudal nobility. Abu-Husayn also considers this implausible, as the Kurdish Janbulads held princely titles, such as bey or beylerbey (Turkish equivalent to emir or amir al-umara, respectively), which were bestowed or recognized by the Ottoman government. Thus, the Jumblatts, as descendants of this family, would have regarded themselves as emirs, rather than holding the inferior title of 'sheikh'.

Abu-Husayn further notes that neither Khalidi nor the prominent 17th-century Maronite historian and associate of the Ma'ns and Shihabs, Istifan al-Duwayhi, mentions members of the Kurdish Janbulads moving to Mount Lebanon. Abu-Husayn holds it to be unlikely that Sheikh Junblat, had he been a descendant of Janbulad, would have been a major local opponent of Fakhr al-Din, as presented by Khalidi. Rather, as an outsider living under Fakhr al-Din's protection, presumably would have been a natural ally. The high political and social status of Sheikh Junblat already in the early 17th century may negate the notion that marriage into Qabalan's family was the transformative event that elevated the Jumblatts to this status in the 18th century.

== Cultural references ==
Samir Habchi's 2003 documentary film Lady of the Palace examines the history of the Jumblatt family from the 17th century onwards. The film focuses on the life of Nazira Jumblatt and the late nineteenth/early twentieth century.

== See also ==
- List of political families in Lebanon

== Bibliography ==
- Abu-Husayn, Abdul-Rahim (1985). Provincial Leaderships in Syria, 1575–1650. Beirut: American University of Beirut. ISBN 978-0-8156-6072-9. OCLC 242675094.
- Abu-Husayn, Abdul-Rahim (1999). "The Junblats and the Janbulads: A Case of Mistaken Identity". In Köhbach, Markus; Procházka-Eisl, Gisela; Römer, Claudia (eds.). Acta Viennensia Ottomanica: Proceedings of the 13th CIEPO-Symposiums, from 21 to 25 September 1998. Vienna: Selbstverlag des Instituts für Orientalistik. pp. 1–6. ISBN 978-3-900345-05-1.
- Abu-Husayn, Abdul-Rahim (new ed.) (2025). "The Junblats and the Canbolads: A Case of Mistaken Identity". In Winter, Stefan; HajHasan, Zainab (eds.). Syrian-Kurdish Intersections in the Ottoman Period. Toronto: University of Toronto Press. pp. 128–136. ISBN 978-1-4875-5440-8.
- Harris, William (2012). Lebanon: A History, 600–2011. New York: Oxford University Press. ISBN 978-0-19-518111-1.
