= Maaniyeh =

Village in Lebanon

Maaniyeh (Arabic: المعنية) is a Christian village in the Chouf District in Mount Lebanon Governorate, Lebanon. The village is 400 meters above sea level, and 42 km from Beirut. The village has moderate weather, highly affected by the Mediterranean sea weather system.

In Maaniyeh there is a Maronite Christian Saint Elias church built in 1866.
