= Al-Anba =

Al-Anba may refer to:

- Al-Anba (Kuwait), an Arabic-language Kuwaiti daily newspaper
- Al Anbaa (Lebanon), a newspaper based in Beirut, Lebanon
