= Lady of the Palace =

- Directed by: Samir Habchi
- Written by: Samir Habchi; Georges Ghanem
- Produced by: Samir Habchi; Misr International Films
- Cinematography: Roland Daou; Roy Lteif
- Music by: Charbel Rouhana
- Distributed by: Misr International Films; Andana Films
- Release date: 2003
- Running time: 58 minutes
- Country: Lebanon
- Language: Arabic

Lady of the Palace (French: La Dame du palais) (Arabic:سيدة القصر Sayedat Al-Kasr) is a 2003 Lebanese documentary written, directed and produced by the Lebanese director Samir Habchi. The film traces the history of Mount Lebanon’s Jumblatt family from the 17th century to the present, focusing on early-twentieth century leader and politician Nazira Jumblatt. Born in 1889, Nazira assumed her place on the throne of the Moukhtara palace in 1923, following the assassination of her husband, Fouad, and the resignation of his brother, Aly Joumblat. She presided over the region as Lady of the Palace for twenty-five years while raising her son Kamal, preparing him to take his place in a long line of Joumblat leaders.

Nazira entered the Lebanese political arena at a time when the field was entirely dominated by men. She helped maintain peace and stability in Lebanon for many years, earning the respect of both men and women alike, be they Druze or Maronites.

This film is volume six of the WOMEN PIONEERS COLLECTION.

== Synopsis ==
In early-twentieth century at a time when the oriental woman indulged herself behind secluded walls, and was deprived of her basic rights. Born in 1889, Nazira Jumblat presided in palaces and social events and occupied a leading position in a male dominated, conservative and closed religious society. She played a significant role in Lebanese politics during an important period in Lebanese history.

== Awards ==
- First Arab documentary released in theatre in Lebanon
- Primé au festival de Carthage- Mention spéciale
