= May Arslan =

Lebanese Druze woman (1928–2013)

- Born: 1928; Lausanne, Switzerland
- Died: 9 September 2013 (aged 84–85)
- Resting place: Moukhtara, Lebanon
- Spouse: Kamal Jumblatt (m. 1948)
- Children: Walid Jumblatt
- Parents: Shakib Arslan (father); Salima El Khass (mother)

May Arslan (1928–2013) was a Lebanese woman who was a member of the Arslan family, and her father was Shakib Arslan. She was the mother of Walid Jumblatt and the spouse of Kamal Jumblatt, founder and leader of the Progressive Socialist Party.

== Biography ==
Arslan was born in Lausanne, Switzerland, in 1928 into a well-established Druze lineage. She was the daughter of Shakib Arslan who was in exile in Switzerland when she was born. Her mother was a Circassian woman, Salima El Khass, who was twenty years younger than Shakib Arslan. She was born in Russia and her family fled to Jordan due to violent persecution of Muslims by the Russian authorities. According to Druze teachings Arslan was considered to be a Muslim, due to both her father's conversion to Islam, and her mother being a Muslim too. Then they settled in Istanbul where she met with Shakib Arslan who was serving as a deputy in the Ottoman Parliament for his native province of Hauran. They married in Beirut in 1916. May Arslan had a brother, Ghaleb, and a sister, Nazimah.

May Arslan was first educated in Lebanon and attended French Lycée in Beirut. She received higher education in France. She married Kamal Jumblatt in Geneva on 1 May 1948. Kamal's family was considered Druze, although while the Arslan was notably considered to be also Druze, due to her mother's lineage, she was not. They had a son, Walid Jumblatt. Although their marriage was for love, Kamal Jumblatt and May Arslan divorced. She resided in Paris between 1954 and 1963 and settled there again in 1965.

Arslan's former husband Kamal Jumblatt was assassinated in 1977. May Arslan died on 9 September 2013 at age 85. A funeral ceremony was held in Moukhtara on 11 September.
