= Raghida Dergham =

Lebanese-American journalist (born 1953)

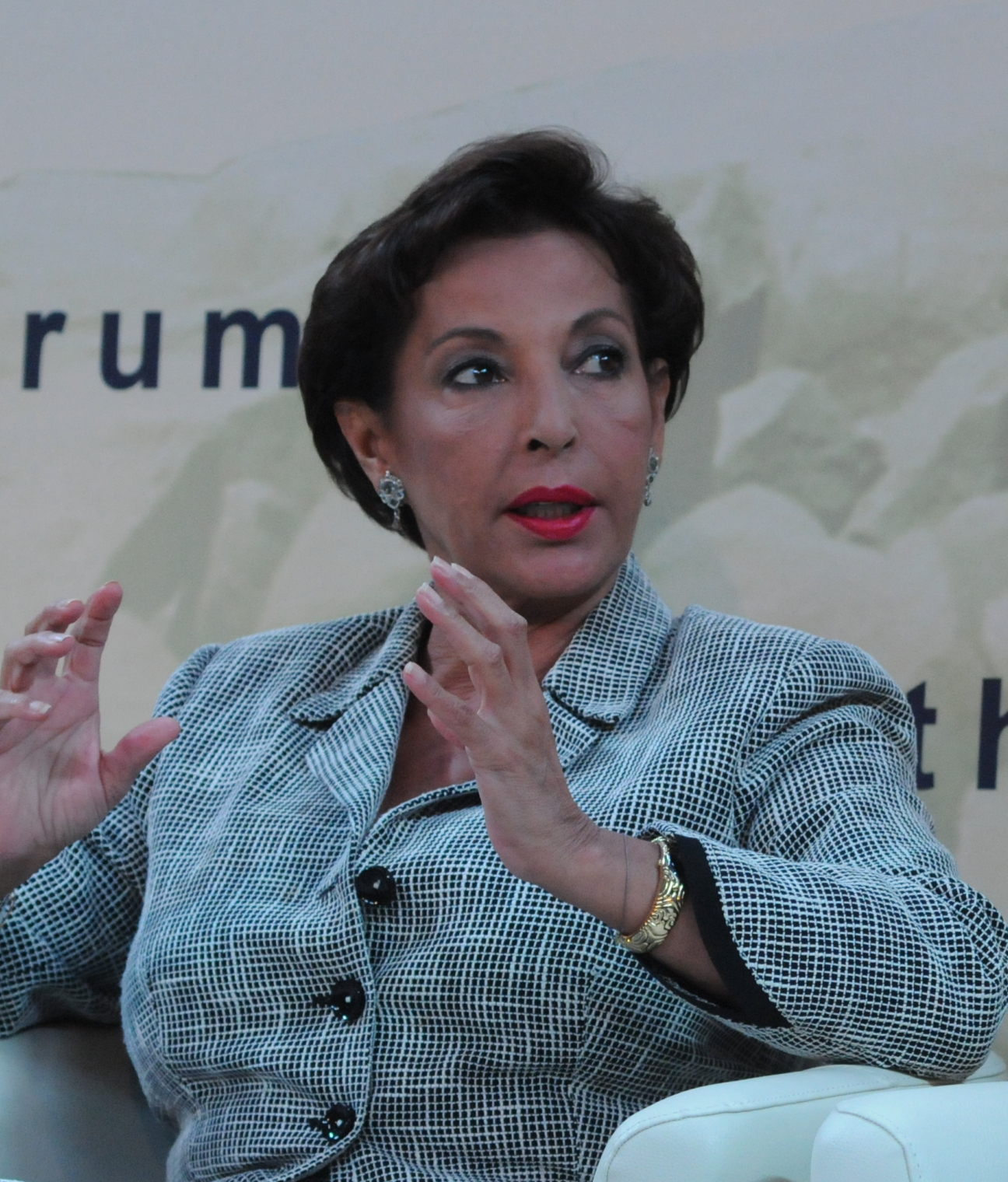
- Dergham in 2012
- Born: 1953 (age 72–73); Beirut, Lebanon
- Education: State University of New York, Plattsburgh
- Occupation: Journalist
- Years active: 1974–present
- Board member of: International Women's Media Foundation
- Website: beirutinstitute.org

Raghida Dergham (Arabic: راغدة درغام; born 1953) is a Lebanese-American journalist based in Lebanon. She is the Founder and Executive Chairman of Beirut Institute and Columnist for Annahar Al Arabi and The National. She served as Columnist, Senior Diplomatic Correspondent, and New York Bureau Chief for the London-based Al-Hayat daily for 28 years. She is well known internationally as a Middle Eastern female journalist, and has received awards for her career achievements.

Dergham sees herself as an interpreter of the Middle Eastern and American cultures for her two audiences.

== Early life ==
Raghida Dergham was born to Nabih and Bahia Dergham in Beirut, Lebanon, in 1953. Her family is Druze in religion. Dergham moved to the United States in 1970 when she was seventeen, and worked her way through college at the State University of New York at Plattsburgh where she studied creative writing and journalism, and graduated in 1974.

== Career ==
Raghida Dergham began her career in journalism at the age of fifteen. She and her friend Hanan al-Shaykh, who is a Lebanese author, would publish their articles in the Beirut newspapers. Dergham published articles in al-Hasnaa (magazine) and al-Anwar (newspaper supplement).

Dergham was first hired professionally as a journalist in Boston, beginning her career in radio in 1974 and hosting a program Haneen (Translated: Nostalgia), and from this start, she became a foreign correspondent in New York in 1976. In 1989, she joined Al-Hayat, an independent daily Arabic newspaper, and began to cover the United Nations. Dergham is now the senior diplomatic correspondent for Al-Hayat and she writes a weekly column on international political affairs.

In addition to being a regular political commentator on CNN, she has made frequent appearances in other international TV and radio broadcast forums. Dergham's work has been featured in many major publications including: The New York Times, Washington Post, Gulf News, LA Times, Newsweek International, and several others.

In 1997, she served as the president of the United Nations Correspondents Association.

She was influenced by the interviewing style of Oriana Fallaci while rejecting her politics and views.

== Notable journalism assignments ==
Raghida Dergham conducted an exclusive interview with Ramzi Youssef who was behind the 1993 World Trade Center bombing.

Dergham is known for her interviews of international leaders and public figures. She has interviewed many notable figures including:

- US President George W. Bush, Secretaries of State Colin Powell and Condoleezza Rice, General David Petraeus
- President Ferdinand Marcos of the Philippines
- King Abdullah and the late King Hussein of Jordan
- Pakistan President Pervez Musharraf
- Egyptian President Hosni Mubarak
- Palestinian Presidents Mahmoud Abbas and Yasser Arafat
- Iraqi President Jalal Talabani
- Yemeni President Ali Abdullah Saleh
- President Omar Al-Bashir of Sudan
- Lebanon's Prime Minister Fouad Siniora
- Lebanon's Former President Michel Suleiman

She covered the US-Soviet Summits in the 1980s between US President Ronald Reagan and Soviet General Secretary Mikhail Gorbachev.

== PBS Caught in the Crossfire ==
Raghida Dergham was one of three Arab-Americans featured in the PBS documentary Caught in the Crossfire: Arab Americans in Wartime which aired on September 4, 2002.

== Trial for treason ==
Raghida Dergham was born in the capital city of Beirut, but her passport was annulled in 2001.

The Lebanese government suspended her Lebanese passport while she was in Beirut on assignment covering UN Secretary General Kofi Annan on 19 June 2000. Later, Lebanon said it had taken action as a result of a May 2000 panel discussion, in which Dergham participated, that included a representative from the Israeli government. The panel discussion was sponsored by the Washington Institute for Near East Policy in Washington, D.C. Dergham was subsequently charged with "dealing with the enemy," a crime in Lebanon, and in June 2001 a trial was going to be held in Lebanon.

The Committee to Protect Journalists responded: "We view the treason case against Dergham as part of a pattern of state harassment intended to punish an independent journalist for doing her job. The government of Lebanon has shown contempt for press freedom and the free public debate that is essential in a democratic society. The charges should be dropped, and Dergham should be free to work without further harassment."

Dergham responded to the verdict. She refused to appear in the military court facing charges of “dealing with enemy” and insisted that consequently the trial was never held and the charges were dropped.

== Awards ==
Dergham is in SUNY's Hall of Fame as a distinguished alumna, and she received an honorary Doctorate of Letters from SUNY in 2003.

She received the 2005 NAAP-NY Achievement Award from the Network of Arab-American Professionals of New York to honor her professional integrity in journalism.

Arabian Business named Dergham one of its 100 Most Powerful Arab Women in 2011 and 2016 issues.

In 2010, the New Arab Woman Forum presented its award to her for being an "exceptional woman" and making a contribution to society.

In 2017, she was named "Arab Woman of the Year" for her achievements in Journalism.

In 2018, Raghida Dergham was ranked among the FORBES Middle East Top 35 Influential Lebanese Business Personalities.

She serves on the board for the International Women's Media Foundation. She is a member of the International Media Council of the World Economic Forum.
