= Lebanese Druze =

Ethnoreligious group in Lebanon

دروز لبنان, durūz Lubnān
- Druze flag

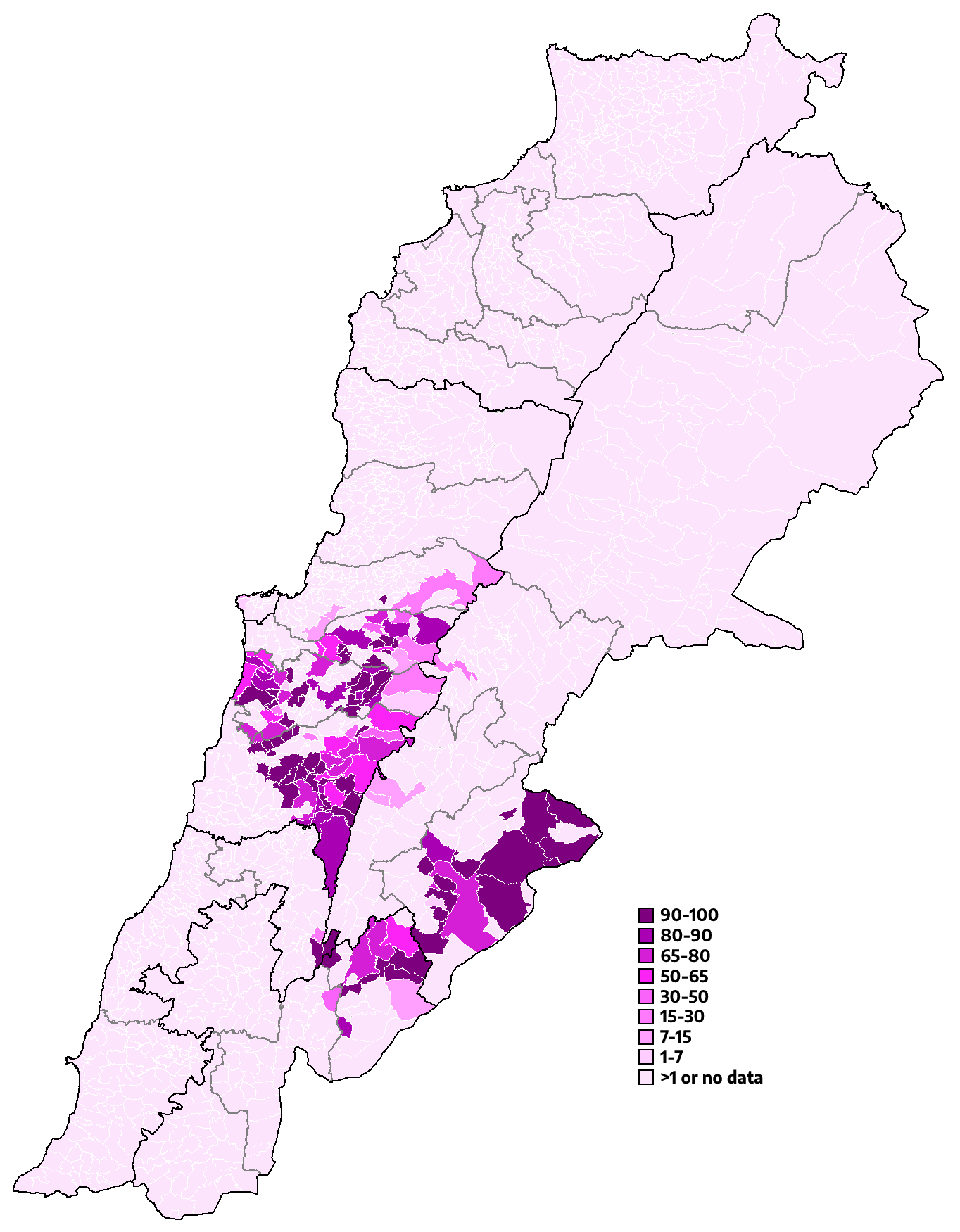
- Distribution of Druzes in Lebanon

Total population
- 250,000

Languages
- Vernacular: Levantine Arabic

Religion
- Druze

The Lebanese Druze (Arabic: دروز لبنان, romanized: durūz Lubnān) are an ethnoreligious group constituting about 5.2 percent of the population of Lebanon. They follow the Druze faith, which is an esoteric monotheistic Abrahamic religion originating from the Levant. They identify as "unitarians", i.e. monotheists (Arabic: موحدين, romanized: muwaḥḥidīn, lit. 'believers in one [God]').

There are estimated to be fewer than 1 million Druze worldwide. The Druze are concentrated in the rural, mountainous areas east and south of Beirut. Lebanon has the world's second-largest Druze population, after Syria's.

Under the Lebanese political division (Parliament of Lebanon Seat Allocation), the Druze community is designated as one of the five Lebanese Muslim communities in Lebanon (Sunni, Shia, Druze, Alawi, and Ismaili), although the Druze are no longer considered formally Muslim. Lebanon's constitution was intended to guarantee political representation for each of the nation's ethno-religious groups.

Wadi al-Taym is generally considered the "birthplace of the Druze faith". The Maronite Catholics and the Druze founded modern Lebanon in the early eighteenth century, through the ruling and social system known as the "Maronite–Druze dualism" in Mount Lebanon Mutasarrifate. Under the terms of an unwritten agreement known as the National Pact between the various political and religious leaders of Lebanon, the Chief of the General Staff must be a Druze.

== History ==
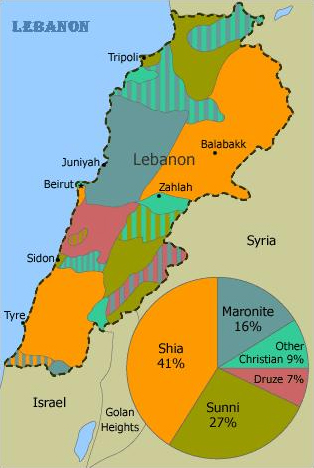
An estimate of the distribution of Lebanon's main religious groups, 1991, based on a map by GlobalSecurity.org

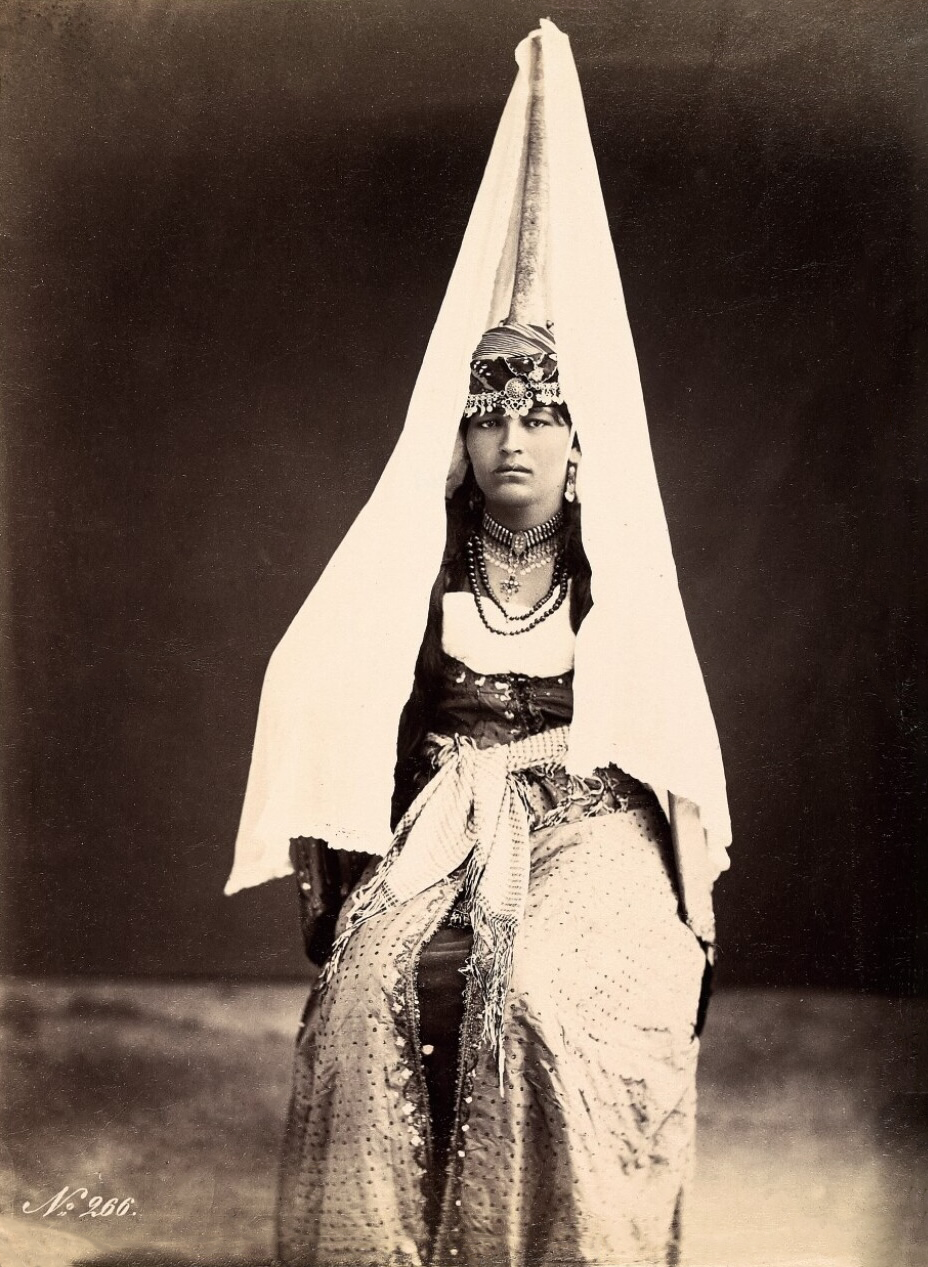
A Druze woman wearing a tantour during the 1870s in Chouf, Lebanon

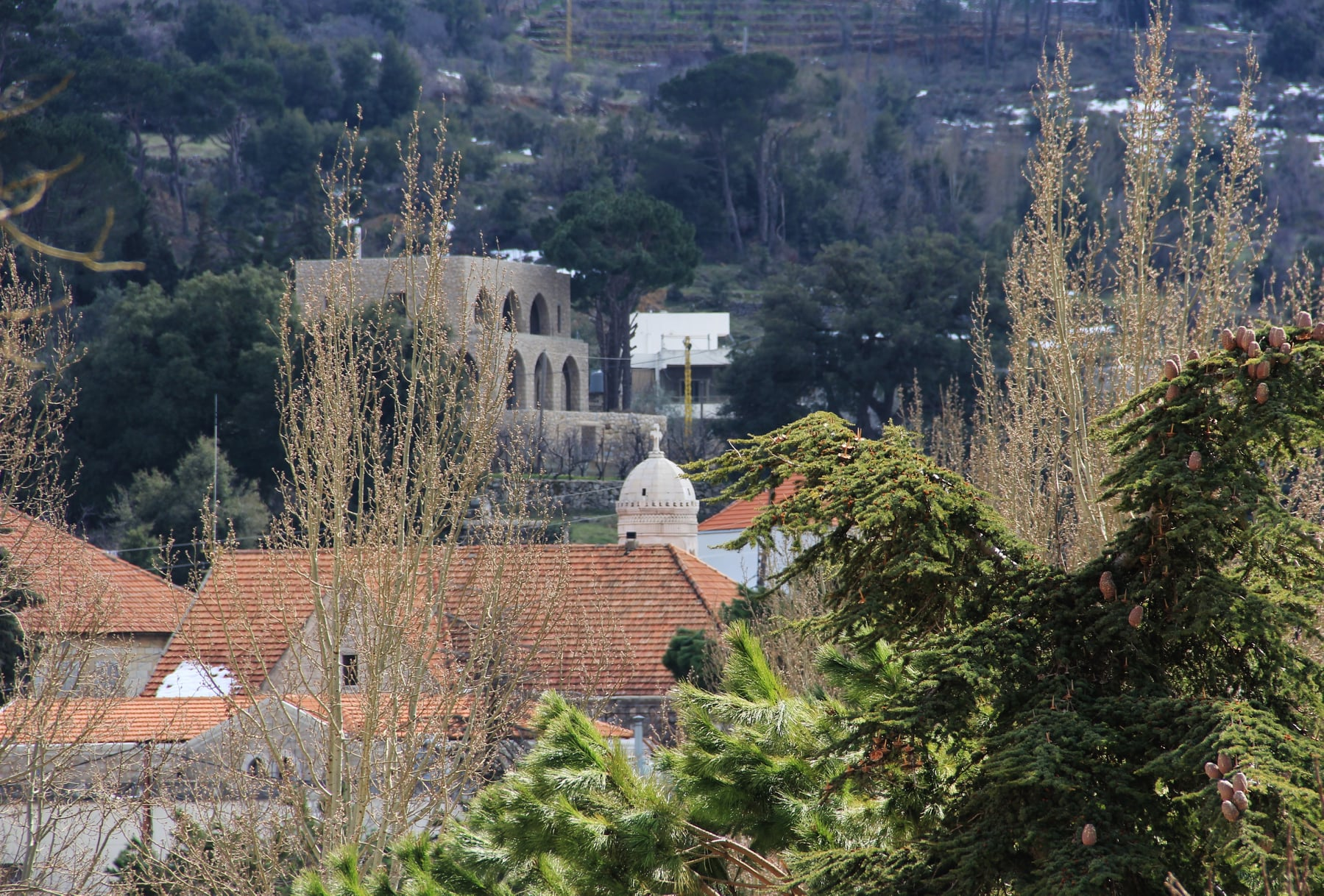
Christian Church and Druze Khalwa in Shuf Mountains.

The Druze faith does not follow the Five Pillars of Islam, such as fasting during the month of Ramadan, and making a pilgrimage to Mecca, therefore they are not considered and do not consider themselves to be Muslims. The Druze faith incorporates elements of both Islam and Christianity. The Druze beliefs incorporate elements of Ismailism, Gnosticism, Neoplatonism and other philosophies.

The Druze call themselves Ahl al-Tawhid "People of Unitarianism or Monotheism" or "al-Muwaḥḥidūn."

"The Druze follow a lifestyle of isolation where no conversion is allowed, neither out of, or into, the religion. When Druze live among people of other religions, they try to blend in, in order to protect their religion and their own safety. They can pray as Muslims, or as Christians, depending on where they are. This system is apparently changing in modern times, where more security has allowed Druze to be more open about their religious belonging."

The Tanukhids inaugurated the Druze community in Lebanon when most of them accepted and adopted the new message that was being preached in the 11th century, due to their leadership's close ties with the Fatimid ruler Al-Hakim bi-Amr Allah.

The relationship between the Druze and Christians in Lebanon has been characterized by harmony and coexistence, with amicable relations between the two groups prevailing throughout history, with the exception of some periods, including the 1860 Mount Lebanon civil war. Similarly, the relationship between the Druze and Muslims in Lebanon was initially shaped by coexistence and a social hierarchy that crossed religious lines. However, according to historian Ussama Makdisi, religious differentiation and sectarian tensions intensified particularly during the nineteenth century, following the Egyptian invasion, the decline of the Shihab emirate, Ottoman Tanzimat reforms, and increased European political intervention.

The Druze faith is often classified as a branch of 10th-century Isma'ilism. Even though the faith originally developed out of Isma'ilism, most Druze do not identify as Muslims. As such, the Druze have frequently experienced persecution by different Islamic regimes such as the Shia Fatimid Caliphate, Sunni Ottoman Empire, and Egypt Eyalet. The persecution of the Druze included massacres, demolishing Druze prayer houses and holy places and forced conversion to Islam. Those were no ordinary killings, they were meant to eradicate the whole community according to the Druze narrative.

The Druze community in Lebanon played an important role in the formation of the modern state, and although they are a minority, they play an important role in the Lebanese political scene. Before and during the Lebanese Civil War (1975–90), the Druze were predominantly in favor of Pan-Arabism and the Palestinian cause as represented by the PLO. Most of the community supported the Progressive Socialist Party formed by their leader Kamal Jumblatt, and they fought alongside other leftist and Palestinian parties against the Lebanese Front that was mainly constituted of Christians. After the assassination of Kamal Jumblatt on 16 March 1977, his son Walid Jumblatt took the leadership of the party. He played an important role in preserving his father's legacy after winning the Mountain War and sustained the existence of the Druze community during the sectarian bloodshed that lasted until 1990.

In August 2001, Maronite Catholic Patriarch Nasrallah Boutros Sfeir toured the predominantly Druze Chouf region of Mount Lebanon and visited Mukhtara, the ancestral stronghold of Druze leader Walid Jumblatt. The tumultuous reception that Sfeir received not only signified a historic reconciliation between Maronites and Druze, who fought a bloody war in 1983–84, but underscored the fact that the banner of Lebanese sovereignty had broad multi-confessional appeal.

It was a cornerstone for the Cedar Revolution in 2005. Jumblatt's post-2005 position diverged sharply from the tradition of his family. He accused Damascus of being behind the 1977 assassination of his father, Kamal Jumblatt, expressing for the first time what many knew he privately suspected. The BBC describes Jumblatt as "the smartest leader of Lebanon's most powerful Druze clan and heir to a leftist political dynasty". The second largest political party supported by Druze is the Lebanese Democratic Party, led by Prince Talal Arslan, the son of Lebanese independence hero Emir Majid Arslan.

On May 10, 2008, Hezbollah forces clashed with Druze militias, resulting in casualties on both sides. The clashes started in Aytat, near Kayfoun, and soon expanded to cover many spots in Mount Lebanon, including Baysur, Shuweifat and Aley. Most of the fighting was concentrated on Hill 888. After negotiations a ceasefire was called in from outside the country before Hezbollah could call in artillery support. Releases from Hezbollah leaders in 2016 stated that bombing the mountain with close-range artillery from the South and longer-ranged artillery from Syria were both an option and greatly considered.

A number of the Druze embraced Christianity, such as some of Shihab dynasty members, as well as the Abi-Lamma clan, During the nineteenth and twentieth centuries, Protestant missionaries established schools and churches in Druze strongholds, with some Druze converting to Protestant Christianity; yet they did not succeed in converting the Druze to Christianity en masse.

On the other hand, many Druze immigrants to the United States have converted to Protestantism, becoming communicants of the Presbyterian or Methodist churches. This allowed them to keep low profiles in small towns.

== Demographics ==
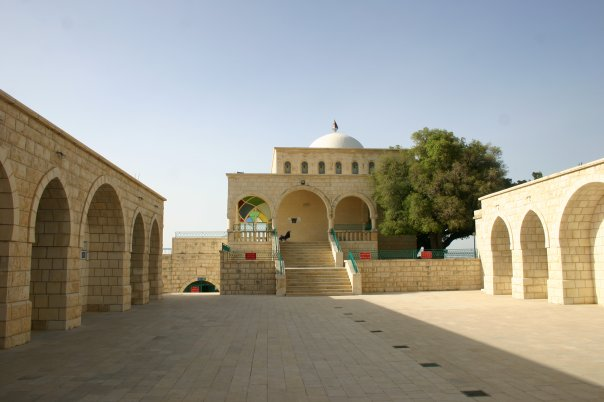
Prophet Job shrine in Niha village.

According to scholar Colbert C. Held of University of Nebraska–Lincoln, the number of Druze people worldwide is around one million, with about 45% to 50% in Syria, 35% to 40% in Lebanon, and less than 10% in Israel.

The Druze are concentrated in the rural, mountainous areas east and south of Beirut. The Lebanese Druze are estimated to constitute 5.2 percent of Lebanon's population. They live in 136 villages in Hasbaya, Rashaya, Chouf, Aley, Marjeyoun and Beirut, and they constitute the majority of the population Aley, Baakleen, Hasbaya and Rashaya. The Druze make up more than half of the population of the Aley District, and they constitute about a third of the residents of the Rachaya District, and they constitute about the quarter of residents of the Chouf District and the Matn District.

In 2014, according to *وقائع إنتخابية عن لبنان، حسب لوائح الناخبين الرسمية الصادرة عن وزارة الداخلية اللبنانية لسنة ٢٠١٤*, Druzes made up 5.59% of registered voters aged 21 and above. In 2022, based on the registered voters aged 21+ for the elections, Druzes represented 5.30% of the global lebanese population. The overall proportions remained very stable between 2014 and 2022, with only slight decrease in this group.

Year
Year	Druzes
2014	5.59%
2022	5.30%

Year	Druzes
Year	Druzes
2014	196 484
2022	212 086
Growth	+15 602
% growth	▲7.36%

Note that the following percentages are estimates only. As the last Lebanese census was conducted in 1932, it is difficult to have precise population estimates.

Distribution of Lebanese Druze by governorates
Governorates of Lebanon	2014		2022	
Governorates of Lebanon	Pop.	%	Pop.	%
Mount Lebanon Governorate	154 535	23.86%	167 265	23.49%
Beqaa Governorate	20 417	6.79%	23 130	6.73%
Nabatieh Governorate	15 535	3.67%	17 435	3.54%
Beirut Governorate	5 205	1.12%	3 638	0.69%
South Governorate	644	0.16%	615	0.13%
North Governorate	64	0.01%	2	0%
Keserwan-Jbeil Governorate	37	0.02%	0	0%
Baalbek-Hermel Governorate	34	0.01%	4	0%
Akkar Governorate	13	0.01%	1	0%
Total Lebanese Druze population	196 484	5.59%	212 086	5.3%

Repartition of Lebanese Druze in Lebanon
Governorates of Lebanon	2014		2022	
Governorates of Lebanon	Pop.	%	Pop.	%
Mount Lebanon Governorate	154 535	78.65%	167 265	78.87%
Beqaa Governorate	20 417	10.39%	23 130	10.91%
Nabatieh Governorate	15 535	7.91%	17 435	8.22%
Beirut Governorate	5 205	2.65%	3 638	1.72%
South Governorate	644	0.33%	615	0.29%
North Governorate	64	0.03%	2	0%
Keserwan-Jbeil Governorate	37	0.02%	0	0%
Baalbek-Hermel Governorate	34	0.02%	4	0%
Akkar Governorate	13	0.01%	1	0%
Total Lebanese Druze population	196484	100%	212 086	100%

== Intercommunal relationships ==
=== Relationship with Lebanese Christians ===
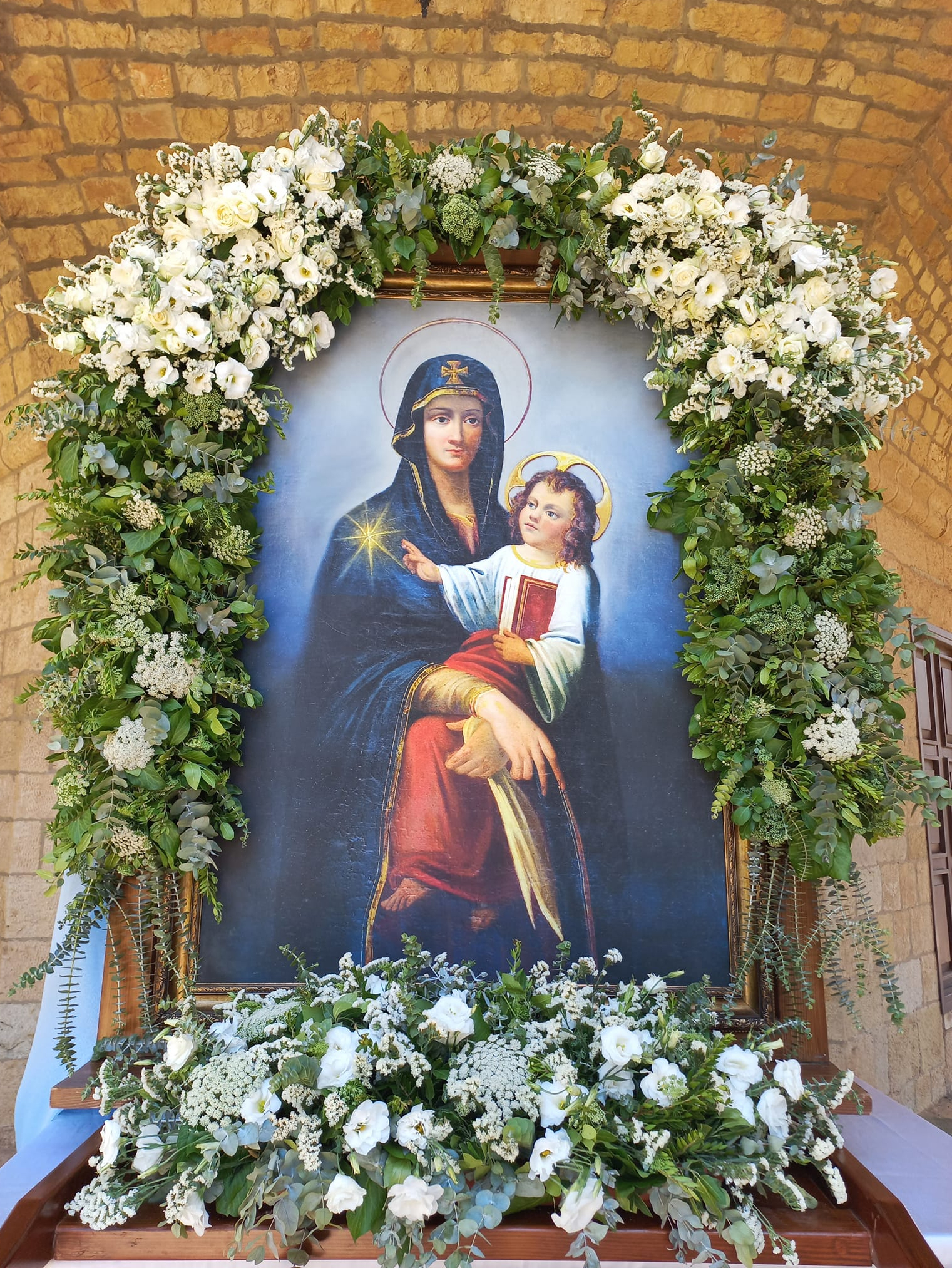
The icon of Saidet et Tallé, also known as "the Virgin of the Druze," is venerated by both the Druze and Maronite Christian communities. This veneration reflects the long-standing interfaith harmony in Lebanon.

Lebanese Christians and Druze became a genetic isolate in the predominantly Islamic world. The Druzite and Maronite community in Lebanon played an important role in the formation of the modern state of Lebanon. Contact between Christians (members of the Maronite, Eastern Orthodox, Melkite, and other churches) and the Unitarian Druze led to the presence of mixed villages and towns in Mount Lebanon (Aley District, Baabda District, and Chouf District), Rashaya District, Hasbaya, Matn District, and Marjeyoun District.

The relationship between the Druze and Christians in Lebanon has been characterized by harmony and coexistence. Historian Ray Jabre Mouawad finds religious symbiosis between Druze and Christians in Mount Lebanon during the Ottoman period. Numerous cultural interactions occurred in Mount Lebanon, producing overlapped symbolism, veneration of shared saints, and use of common words to designate God, the traces of which are discovered in the palaces and mausoleums of Druze lords, as well as in Maronite and Greek Orthodox churches. There have been spurts of inter communal violence between the Druze and Maronite Christians, however this came mostly with the construction of Sectarian identities and roles under European colonial intervention.

Druze and Christians in Lebanon celebrate each other's births, weddings, funerals, and celebrations such as Christmas, Maundy Thursday and Easter, especially before and after the Lebanese Civil War. Thursday of the Dead is a feast day shared by Christians and Druze in the Lebanon. It falls sometime between the Easter Sundays of the Catholic and Eastern Orthodox Christian traditions. It is a day on which the souls of the dead are honoured. A popular day among women in the region, it underscores the shared culture between Arab Christians and Druze in Lebanon. The baptism of children in accordance with Christian custom was usually in large, well-known Lebanese Druze families. In the period of Egyptian rule in the Levant in the 1830s, many Druze converted to Christianity to avoid enlistment into the Egyptian army, according to historian Aharon Layish there is also explicit evidence of Druze in Lebanon under the Ottoman rule posing as Christians for practical reasons.

Due to the Christian influence on the Druze faith, two Christian saints become the Druze's favorite venerated figures: Saint George and Saint Elijah. Thus, in all the villages inhabited by Druze and Christians in central Mount Lebanon a Christian church or Druze maqam is dedicated to either one of them. According to Ray Jabre Mouawad the Druze admire the two saints for their bravery: Saint George because he confronted the dragon and Saint Elijah because he competed with the pagan priests of Baal and won over them. In both cases the explanations provided by Christians is that Druze were attracted to warrior saints that resemble their own militarized society.

== Notable people ==
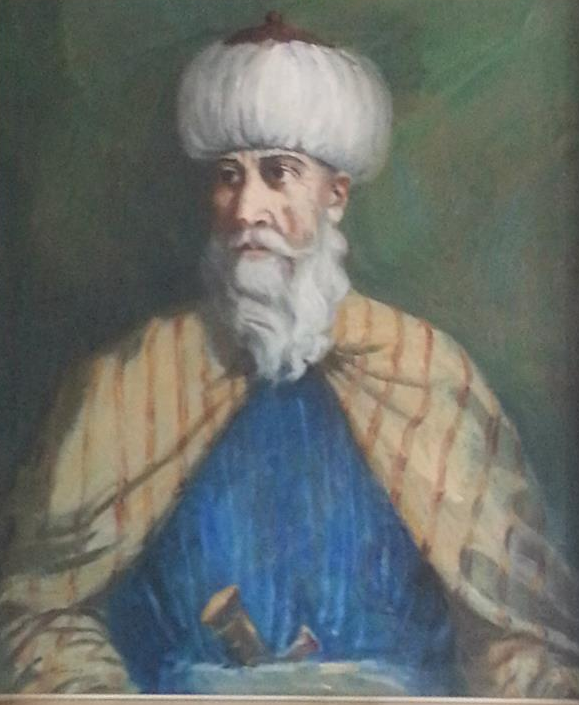
Fakhr-al-Din II

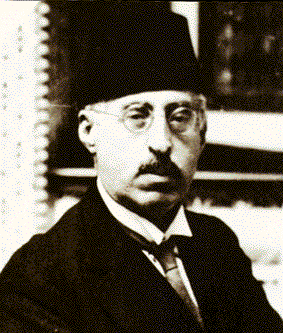
Shakib Arslan

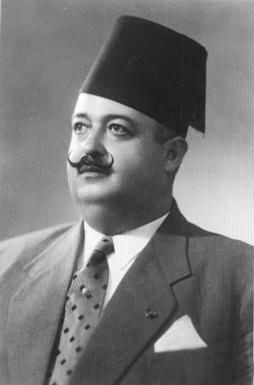
Majid Arslan

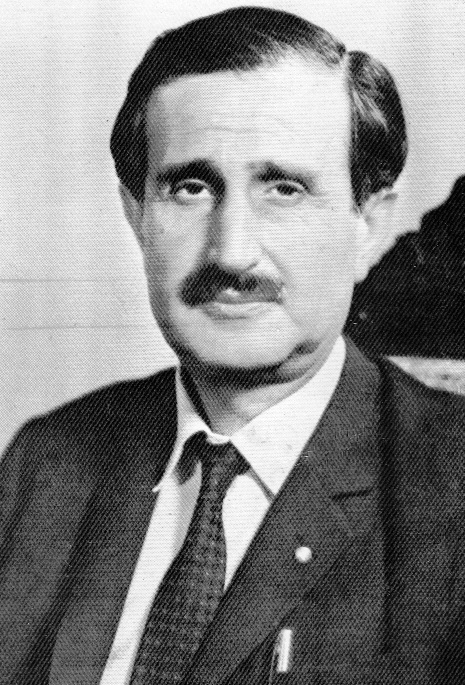
Kamal Jumblatt

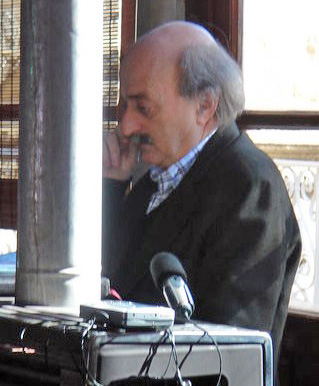
Walid Jumblatt

- Fakhr-al-Din II (1572–1635), a Druze prince and an early leader of the Emirate of Chouf.
- Emir Shakib Arslan (1869–1946), a Druze prince and notable Islamic scholar.
- Emir Majid Arslan (1908–1983), head of the Arslan feudal Druze ruling family and leader of the final independence movement for Lebanon.
- Kamal Jumblatt (1917–1977), a prominent Lebanese progressive socialist politician.
- Casey Kasem (1932–2014), a Lebanese-American radio personality/DJ born in Detroit.
- Nabil Kanso (born 1946), a Lebanese-American painter.
- Akram Chehayeb (born 1947), a Lebanese politician, member of parliament, and Minister of Agriculture.
- Walid Jumblatt (born 1949), a Lebanese politician and the former leader of the Progressive Socialist Party (PSP).
- Raghida Dergham (born 1953), a Lebanese-American journalist based in New York.
- Ghazi Aridi (born 1954), a Lebanese politician, and member of parliament.
- Samir Kuntar (1962–2015), a member of the Palestinian Liberation Front representing Hezbollah.
- Emir Talal Arslan (born 1965), Lebanese politician and the head of the mostly Druze Lebanese Democratic Party.
- Mona Abou Hamze (born 1972), a TV presenter.
- Amal Clooney (born 1978), a London-based British-Lebanese lawyer, activist, and author (Druze father and Sunni mother).
- Tarek William Saab Venezuelan politician of Lebanese Druze Origin.
- Rania Khalek Lebanese American Journalist

== See also ==
- Religion in Lebanon
