= Baadarâne =

Baadarâne بعدران
- Town
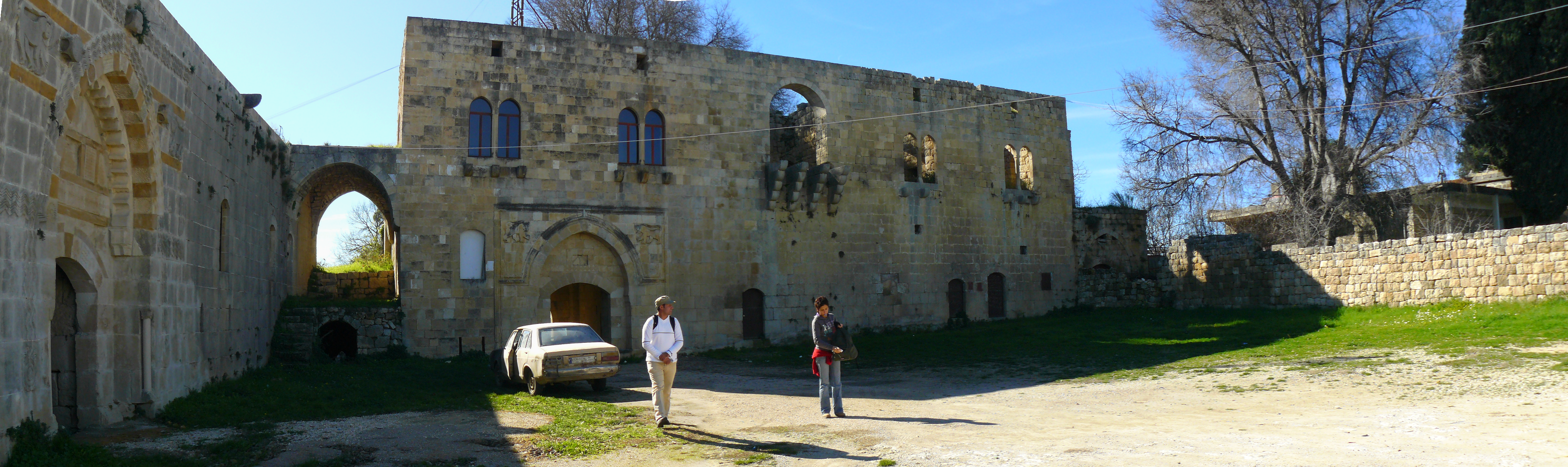
- Remains of a palace in Baadarâne, Shouf, Lebanon

- Location within Lebanon
- Coordinates: 33°38′10.3″N 35°37′08.9″E
- Country: Lebanon
- Governorate: Mount Lebanon Governorate
- District: Chouf District
- Lowest elevation: 1,050 m (3,440 ft)
- Time zone: UTC+2 (EET)
  - Summer (DST): UTC+3 (EEST)
- Dialing code: +961

Baadarâne (Arabic: بعدران Baʿdarān), is an area in Chouf, Mount Lebanon, Lebanon. Baadarane is 60 kilometres (37 mi) away from Beirut at an elevation of 1,050 meters.

Baadarane is a town with an elevation of 1050m. It is known for the remains in al (Meydan) which is an old building and is located on a mountain so the weather is cold and especially in winter, snow covers the town.

== Abandoned Airport ==
The area is home to the abandoned Baadaran Airstrip built during the Lebanese Civil War, however it was never operated as active aerodrome. The concrete runway is the only visible infrastructure.
