= Al Anbaa (Lebanon) =

Online newspaper in Beirut, Lebanon

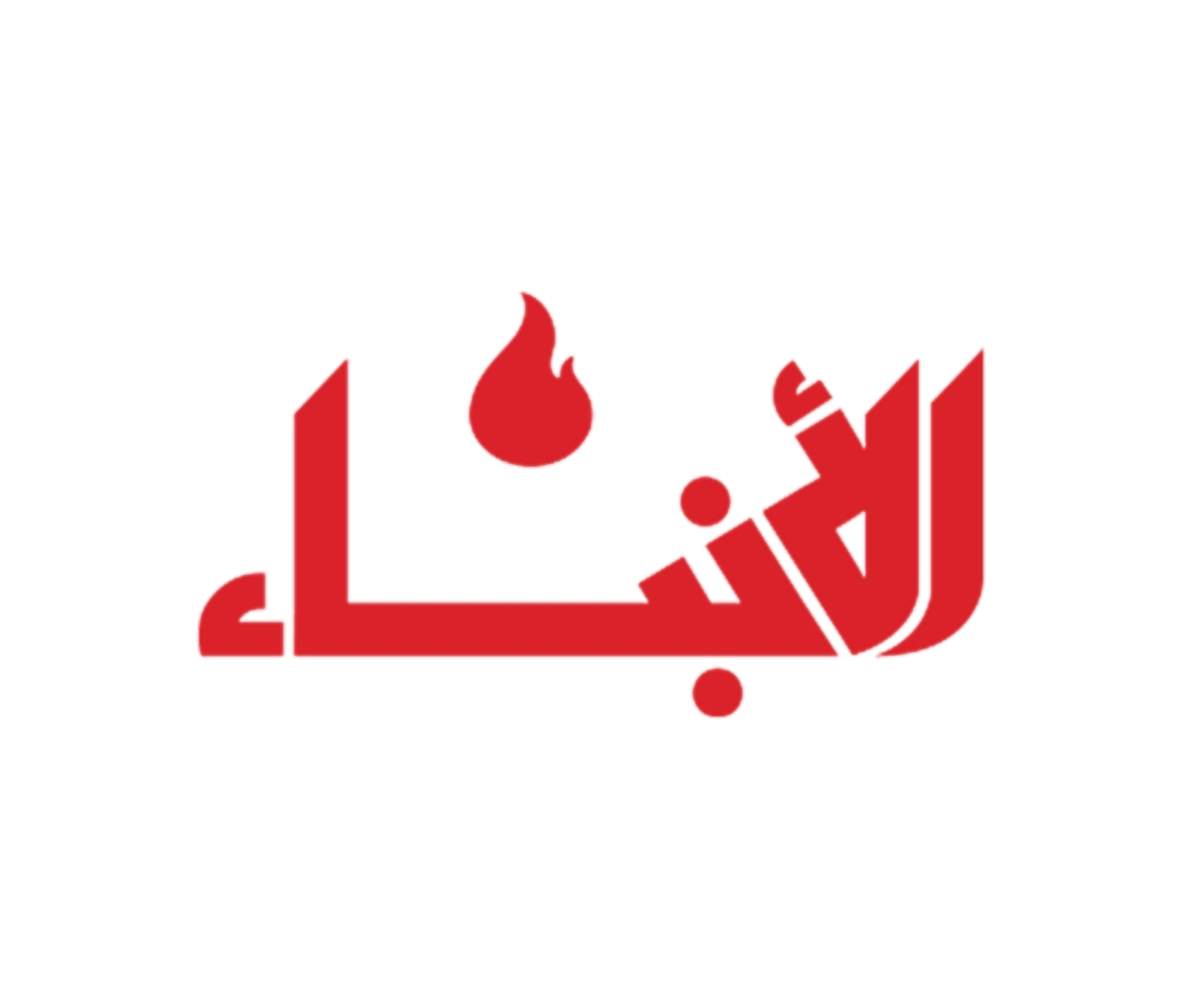
- الأنباء
- Type: Online newspaper
- Founder: Kamal Jumblatt
- Founded: 15 March 1951
- Political alignment: Progressive Socialist Party
- Language: Arabic
- Ceased publication: 2012 (print)
- Headquarters: Beirut
- Country: Lebanon
- Website: Al Anbaa

Al Anbaa is a newspaper based in Beirut, Lebanon. Founded in 1951 the print edition of the paper ceased publication in 2012. Since then it has been published as an online newspaper.

== History and profile ==
Al Anbaa was established by Kamal Jumblatt, and the first issue appeared on 15 March 1951. As of 2008 the publisher and director-in-charge was Aziz El Metni who survived an arson attack in Qornet Shehwan on 19 January 2008. As of 2010 the editor-in-chief was Rami Hassib Rayess who was also a senior media officer at the #FF9966.

The paper is close to the Walid Jumblatt's Progressive Socialist Party. Jumblatt publishes editorials in the paper. His father and the founder of the paper, Kamal Jumblatt, also regularly published articles in Al Anbaa. Some of them contained harsh criticisms against President Bechara El Khoury in the early 1950s. For instance, he argued in an article that Bechara El Khoury and his family were like an "octopus with three heads: injustice, corruption and vanity." Following the publication of his articles dated 30 May 1952 in which he attacked the Lebanese regime this issue of Al Anbaa was confiscated by the government.

Al Anbaa also attacked the Syrian Social Nationalist Party in the early 1950s. The paper was critical of Syrian ruler, Hafez al-Assad, and Kataeb Party in the 1970s. It was a weekly print newspaper until 2012 when it became an online-only publication.
