= Shakib Arslan =

Druze prince, politician, writer and historian (1869–1946)

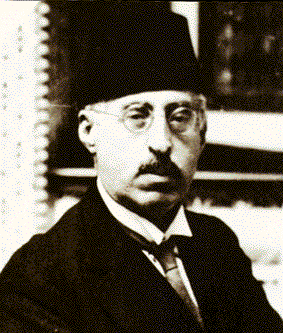
- Born: 25 December 1869; Choueifat, Ottoman Syria
- Died: 9 December 1946 (aged 76); Beirut, Lebanon
- Other name: Amir al-Bayān
- Occupations: Politician; writer; poet; historian
- Children: May Arslan
- Relatives: Emir Majid Arslan II; Emir Talal Arslan; Walid Jumblatt (grandson)

Shakib Arslan (Arabic: شَكيب أَرْسَلان, romanized: Shakīb Arslān; 25 December 1869 – 9 December 1946) was a Lebanese writer, poet, historian, politician, and Emir in Lebanon. A prolific writer, he produced some 20 books and 2,000 articles, as well as two collections of poetry and a "prodigious correspondence". He was known as Amir al-Bayān (Arabic: أَميرُ البَيان, lit. 'Prince of Eloquence') due to his influential writings.

== Biography ==
Influenced by the ideas of Jamal al-Din al-Afghani and Muhammad Abduh, Arslan became a strong supporter of the pan-Islamic policies of Abdul Hamid II. As an Arab nationalist, Arslan was an advocate of pan-Maghrebism (the unification of Algeria, Tunisia and Morocco). He also argued that the survival of the Ottoman Empire was the only guarantee against the division of the ummah and its occupation by the European imperial powers. For Arslan, Ottomanism and Islam were inseparable, and reform of Islam would naturally lead to the revival of the Ottoman Empire.

Exiled from his homeland by the French Mandate authorities, Arslan spent most of the inter-war years in Geneva, where he served as the unofficial representative of Syria and Palestine to the League of Nations and wrote a steady stream of articles for the periodical press of Arab countries. There he cofounded and edited a newspaper entitled La Nation Arabe. His partner in this activity was Ihsan Al Jabri, a Syrian exile. Arslan was also a contributor to Barid Al Sharq, a propaganda newspaper published in Berlin, Nazi Germany. However, Arslan did not personally agree with Nazism, instead viewing them as a tool to break the other colonial powers. In 1939, he wrote to Daniel Guérin that if the Germans proved to be no better to the Arabs, "they would have only changed masters." In his diary, he remarked that the Italians would simply turn Palestine into an Italian colony.

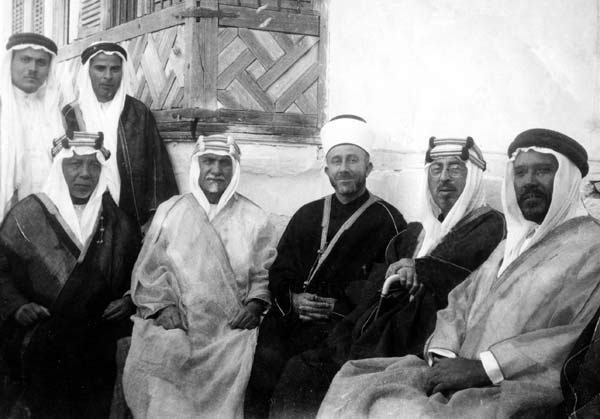
Prince Shakib (second from right) on a visit to Saudi Arabia in the early 1930s, dressed in a Bedouin costume. On his right are Mohammad Amin al-Husayni, the Grand Mufti of Jerusalem, and Hashim al-Atassi, who later became President of Syria.

== Advocacy ==
Amir Shakib proposed an interpretation of Islam imbued with a sense of political power and moral courage. He sought to rebuild the bonds of Islamic unity, urging Muslims from Morocco to Iraq to remember their common commitment to Islam despite their individual differences. Shakib believed that recognising and acting upon this common bond could lead to liberation from their existing subjugation. He also saw this unity as a way of reviving what he saw as their illustrious history. Arslan's work inspired anti-imperialist propaganda campaigns, much to the irritation of the British and French authorities in the Arab world. In 1937, he met with anti-imperialist activist Léo Wanner in Geneva.

He defended Islam as an essential component of social morality. His message, with its call to action and defence of traditional values in a time of great uncertainty, was well received and attracted widespread attention in the 1920s and 1930s. It was during this period that he wrote his most famous work, Our Decline: Its Causes and Remedies, which described what Arslan believed to be the reasons for the weakness of existing Muslim governments.

He contributed to Muhib Al Din Al Khatib's Cairo-based magazine Al Fath, a modernist Salafi publication.

== Personal life ==
Letters of Shakib Arslan (1931)

Born into a Druze family, he always tried to combine his faith with mainstream Islam, but later converted to Sunni Islam, "establishing himself as an orthodox Muslim serving the interests of Sunni Islam".

He married Suleima Alkhas Hatog, a Jordanian of Circassian descent. They had a son, Ghalib (born 1917 in Lebanon) and two daughters, May (1928–2013) and Nazima (born 1930 in Switzerland). His daughter May married the Lebanese Druze politician Kamal Jumblatt, making the Lebanese politician Walid Jumblatt a grandson of Arslan.

Arslan died on 9 December 1946, three months after returning to Lebanon.

== Work ==
- Arslan, Shakib (2004). Our Decline: Its Causes and Remedies. Islamic Book Trust. ISBN 9789839154542. OL 9198790M.
