= Walid Jumblatt =

Lebanese politician (born 1949)

- وليد جنبلاط
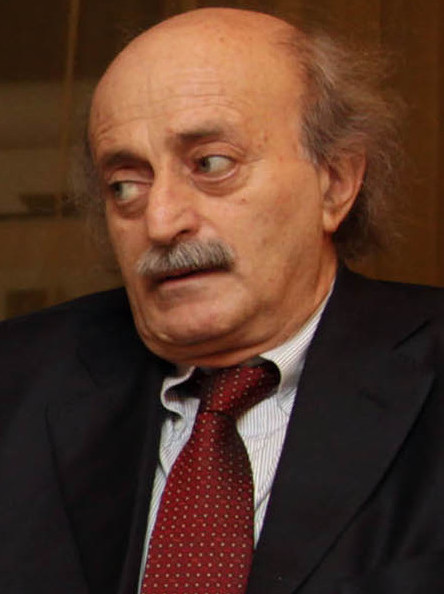
- Jumblatt in 2010

Member of the Lebanese Parliament
- In office 23 August 1992 – 15 May 2018
- Constituency: Chouf (1992, 1996, 2000, 2005, 2009)

Leader of the Progressive Socialist Party
- In office 16 March 1977 – 25 May 2023
- Preceded by: Kamal Jumblatt
- Succeeded by: Taymur Jumblatt

Personal details
- Born: 7 August 1949 (age 77) Moukhtara, Chouf District, Lebanon
- Party: Progressive Socialist Party
- Other political affiliations: March 14 Alliance (2005−2009)
- Spouse: Nora Jumblatt
- Children: Taymour (born 1982); Aslan (born 1983); Dalia (born 1989)
- Parent(s): Kamal Beyk Jumblatt; Emira May Arslan
- Relatives: Emir Shakib Arslan (grandfather)
- Occupation: Politician; Military commander (until 1990)

Military service
- Allegiance: People's Liberation Army
- Service years: 1977–1991
- Battles and wars: 1982 Lebanon War; Mountain War; Siege of Souk al-Gharb; Siege of Deir al-Qamar; Battle of Bhamdoun; War of the Camps; War of the Flag; War of Elimination

Walid Kamal Jumblatt (Arabic: وليد كمال جنبلاط, romanized: Walīd Kamāl Junblāṭ; born 7 August 1949) is a Lebanese politician who served as the leader of the Progressive Socialist Party (PSP) from 1977 until 2023. A hereditary leader of the Lebanese Druze and a prominent former warlord, Jumblatt led his party's militia, the People's Liberation Army (PLA), during the Lebanese Civil War. Under his leadership, the PSP consolidated an autonomous Druze administration in the Chouf and Aley regions following victories in the 1983 Mountain War.

Throughout his career, Jumblatt became known for his pragmatic and shifting political alliances. After collaborating closely with Syria during the Civil War and the years immediately following, he became a key architect of the anti-Syrian Cedar Revolution in 2005, that resulted in the withdrawal of Syrian troops from Lebanon. He later adopted a centrist position before taking a staunch anti-Assad stance during the Syrian Civil War. He stepped down from the PSP leadership in 2023, passing the position to his son, Taymur Jumblatt.

== Early life and education ==
Jumblatt was born on 7 August 1949 in Moukhtara, the ancestral seat of the Jumblatt family. He is the son of Kamal Jumblatt, the philosopher, leftist intellectual, and founder of the Progressive Socialist Party, and May Arslan, daughter of the prominent Druze-turned-Muslim prince Shakib Arslan.

Jumblatt received his early education at the College Protestant Français in Beirut. He later completed his secondary education at the International College (IC) before enrolling at the American University of Beirut (AUB), from which he graduated with a bachelor's degree in Political Science and Public Administration in 1972.

== Lebanese Civil War (1977–1990) ==
Following his graduation, Jumblatt briefly worked as a journalist for the prominent Lebanese daily newspaper An Nahar. His life changed abruptly on 16 March 1977, when his father Kamal Jumblatt was assassinated in an ambush in the Chouf, an operation widely attributed to Syrian intelligence. At the age of 27, Walid Jumblatt was selected to succeed his father as both the hereditary leader of the Jumblatt clan and the president of the Progressive Socialist Party.

On 12 January 1982, Jumblatt survived a major assassination attempt when a car bomb exploded near his residence in the Clemenceau neighborhood of Beirut. He later attributed the attack to Elie Hobeika, the security chief of the right-wing Christian Lebanese Forces militia.

=== The Mountain War ===
Following the 1982 Israeli invasion of Lebanon, Israeli forces occupied the Chouf and Aley districts, allowing the Christian Lebanese Forces militia to enter the Druze-majority heartland. In July 1983, Jumblatt formed the National Salvation Front alongside former president Suleiman Frangieh and former prime minister Rashid Karami to oppose the government of President Amine Gemayel and the controversial May 17 Agreement with Israel.

When Israeli troops abruptly withdrew from the mountains in September 1983, it triggered the Mountain War. Jumblatt's militia, the People's Liberation Army (PLA), backed by Syrian logistical support and Palestinian factions, launched a sweeping offensive against the Lebanese Forces and the Lebanese Army. Following decisive victories at the Battle of Bhamdoun and the subsequent Siege of Deir al-Qamar, Jumblatt's forces decisively routed the Christian militias. The conflict resulted in severe multi-communal massacres and the displacement of tens of thousands of Christian civilians from the Chouf mountains, establishing Jumblatt as the undisputed leader of an autonomous Druze enclave.

In May 1984, following the abrogation of the May 17 Agreement, Jumblatt joined a National Unity cabinet under Prime Minister Rashid Karami, serving as the Minister of Public Works, Transport, and Tourism. In December 1985, alongside Nabih Berri of the Shiite Amal Movement and Elie Hobeika of the Lebanese Forces, Jumblatt signed the Syrian-sponsored Tripartite Accord in Damascus, though the agreement was later dismantled by a coup within the Christian lines.

During the late 1980s, Jumblatt's PLA militia fought alongside Amal against Palestinian factions in the War of the Camps, but later engaged in fierce clashes against Amal in West Beirut during the 1987 War of the Flag. He subsequently supported Syria in suppressing General Michel Aoun's "War of Liberation" in 1989–1990, paving the way for the end of the civil war under the Taif Agreement.

== The Post-War Era and Political Shifts ==
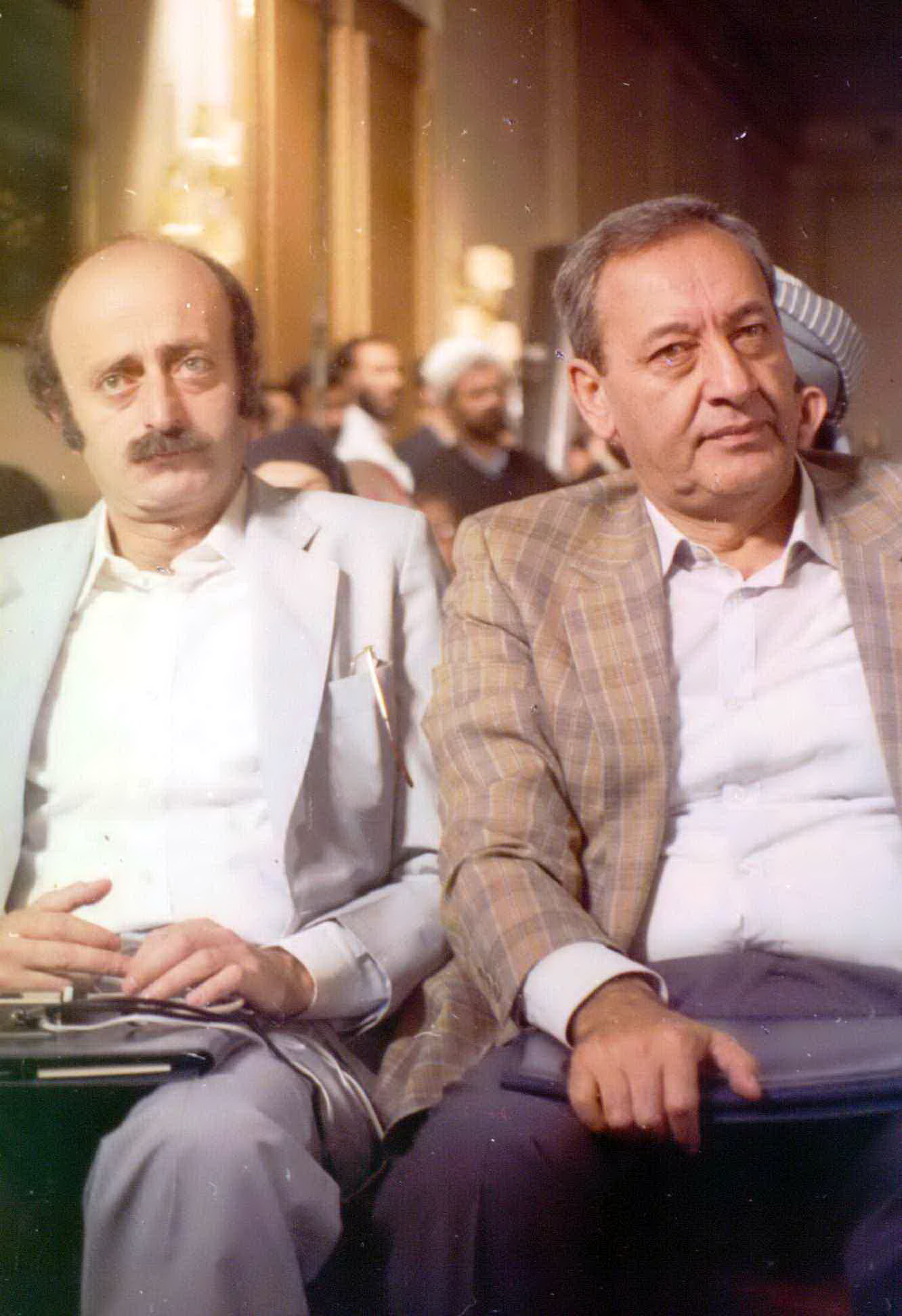
Walid Jumblatt with Nabih Berri and in conference for Afghan issues-Iran-Tehran (1989)

Following the dissolution of the PLA militia in 1991, Jumblatt transitioned into post-war politics. He served as a Minister of State in subsequent cabinets and was appointed Minister for displaced persons in the 1996 government of Prime Minister Rafic Hariri, overseeing the gradual return of Christian refugees to the Chouf mountains. He was continuously elected as a Member of Parliament for the Chouf constituency starting in 1992.

=== The Cedar Revolution ===
While Jumblatt maintained a strategic alliance with Damascus throughout the 1990s, his relationship fractured following the death of Hafez al-Assad in 2000 and the ascension of Bashar al-Assad. Jumblatt grew deeply critical of the new Syrian administration's extension of President Émile Lahoud's term.

Following the assassination of his close political ally Rafic Hariri on 14 February 2005, Jumblatt became one of the main leaders of the anti-Syrian Cedar Revolution. He joined the March 14 Alliance and fiercely demanded the total withdrawal of Syrian troops from Lebanon, which was achieved in April 2005. During this period, he raised concerns over the armed status of Hezbollah, questioning whether their strategic allegiance lay with a centralized Lebanese state or regional patrons in Tehran and Damascus.

=== Realignment and Later Politics ===
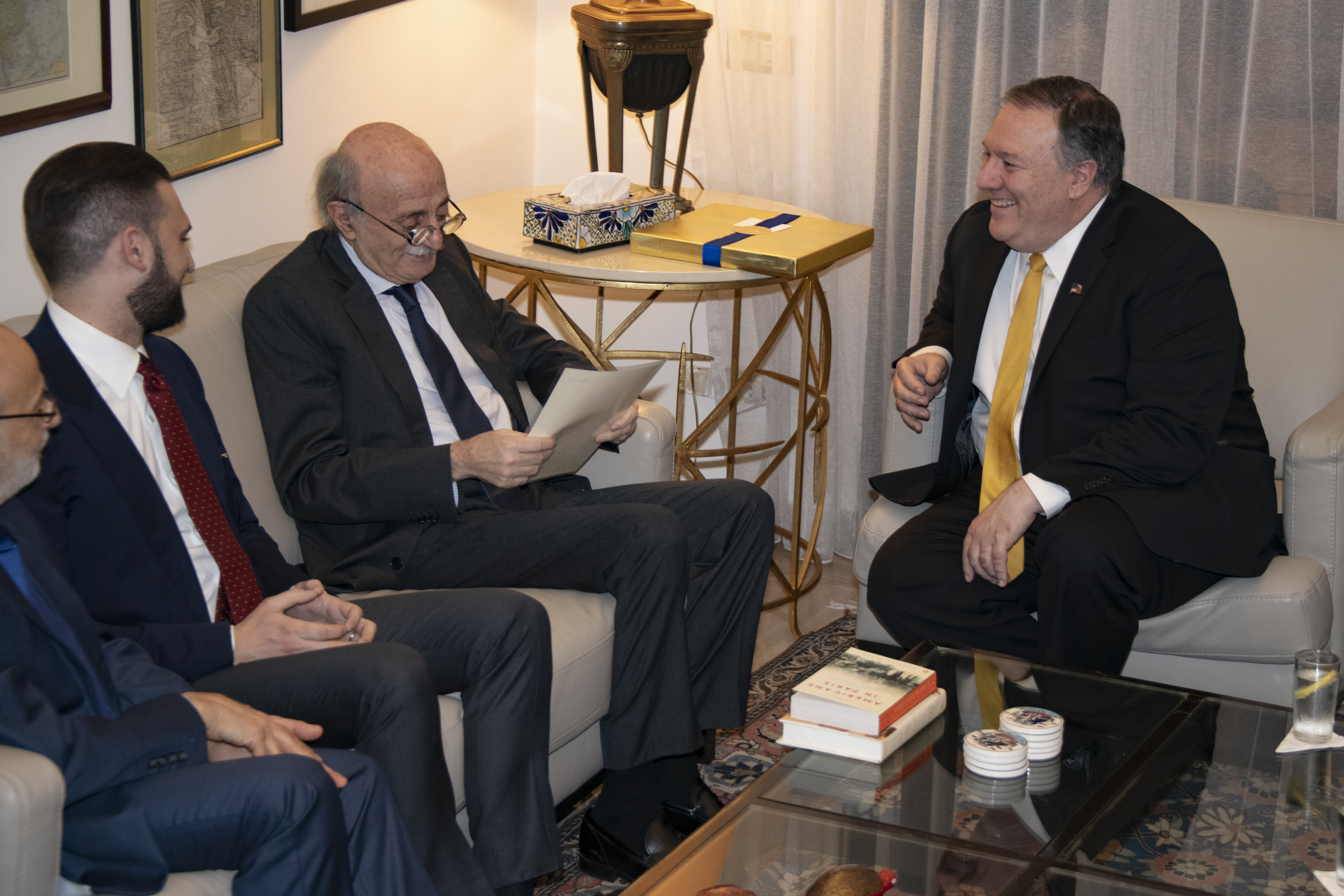
Walid Jumblatt Meets With Mike Pompeo (22 March 2019)

Following the May 2008 armed clashes in Beirut and Mount Lebanon, during which Hezbollah forces clashed with March 14 supporters, Jumblatt initiated a strategic political realignment. Believing that continued polarization threatened the security of the Druze community, he officially exited the March 14 Alliance in August 2009, declaring the PSP a centrist independent bloc to facilitate regional stability.

With the outbreak of the Syrian Civil War in 2011, Jumblatt adopted a staunch anti-Assad stance, publicly stating that he believed the order to assassinate his father in 1977 had come directly from Hafez al-Assad. He actively negotiated with Syrian rebel factions, including the al-Nusra Front, to secure the protection of the Syrian Druze population in the Idlib and Suwayda governorates.

In May 2023, after leading the Progressive Socialist Party for 46 years, Jumblatt announced his resignation as party chief. During a party convention in Ain Zhalta, his son Taymur Jumblatt was chosen unopposed as his successor. Following the fall of the Assad regime in December 2024, Jumblatt traveled to Damascus on 22 December 2024 to meet with Ahmed al-Sharaa (the leader of Hay'at Tahrir al-Sham) to discuss the status and security of Syria's minority communities.

During the July 2025 clashes in Suwayda, Jumblatt called for a political settlement under Syrian state authority, warning that continued instability in the province could be exploited by external actors, including Israel, to gain leverage in southern Syria. In April 2026, Jumblatt visited Damascus and met Syrian President Ahmed al-Sharaa at the People's Palace. The talks focused on the aftermath of violence in Suwayda, strengthening Lebanese–Syrian relations, and regional tensions, including Israeli escalation against both countries during the Middle Eastern crisis.

== Personal life ==
At the age of 20, Jumblatt married an Iranian actress who was ten years his senior, a union his father strongly opposed, leading to a temporary estrangement. Following his divorce and his father's death, Jumblatt married Gervette, a Jordanian woman of Circassian descent, in 1981. Together they had three children: Taymour, Aslan, and Dalia.

He later married Nora al-Sharabati, the daughter of the former Syrian Defense Minister Ahmad al-Sharabati. Nora Jumblatt became a prominent cultural figure in Lebanon, serving as the director of the Beiteddine Festival.

== Honours ==
- (Russia) Medal of the Order of Friendship (Russian Federation)

== Publications ==
- Un destin au Levant: De la guerre civile à la paix incertaine, Paris, Éditions Stock, 2026.

== See also ==
- Cedar Revolution
- Druze in Lebanon
- Lebanese Civil War
- Mountain War (Lebanon)
- People's Liberation Army (Lebanon)
- Jumblatt family
