= Moukhtara =

Human settlement in Lebanon

- المختارة (Arabic)
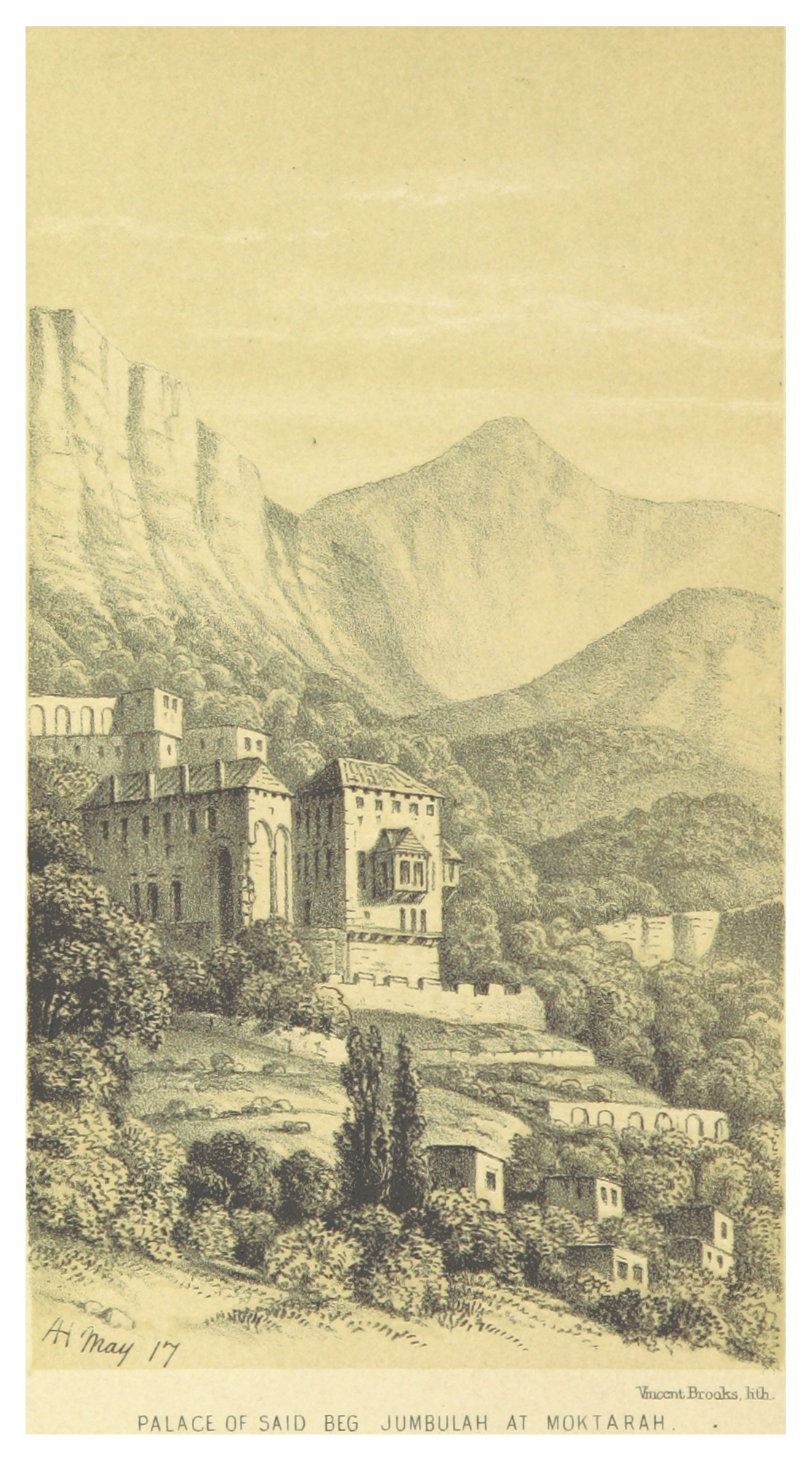
- The Jumblatt family palace in Moukhtara, 1861

- Location within Lebanon
- 33.658863°N 35.613877°E
- Periods: PPNB, Neolithic
- Location: 30 miles from Beirut, Lebanon
- Region: Chouf District, Mount Lebanon Governorate
- Part of: Settlement

Site notes
- Material: tools, flint, bone, ceramics
- Excavation dates: 1963
- Archaeologists: J. Cauvin
- Condition: ruins
- Public access: Yes

Moukhtara (Arabic: المختارة) is a small town in the Chouf District of the Mount Lebanon Governorate of Lebanon. The town's inhabitants are divided between Druze and Maronites. It is the hometown of Walid Jumblatt, the former leader of Lebanon's Progressive Socialist Party.

== History ==
It is also an ancient archaeological site, excavated in 1963 by Jacques Cauvin who found an abundance of flint tools. Examinations were conducted on 378 artifacts with finds including daggers, arrowheads, sickles, axes, chisels, picks and awls traced to the Neolithic horizon. James Mellaart suggested that Heavy Neolithic tools and weapons found at the site were "not associated with pottery, and possibly earlier than the Pottery Neolithic of Byblos."

== Literature ==
- Cauvin, J., "The Neolithic Moukhtara (South Lebanon)," L'Anthropologie, 67, 1963, p. 489-511. (1963)
- Cauvin, J. et Cauvin, M.-C., Des ateliers campigniens au Liban, in Mélanges R. Vaufrey, La préhistoire, problèmes et tendances. Paris, Éditions du CNRS, p. 103-116. (1968)
