= Chouf District =

Chouf District جبل الشوف
- District
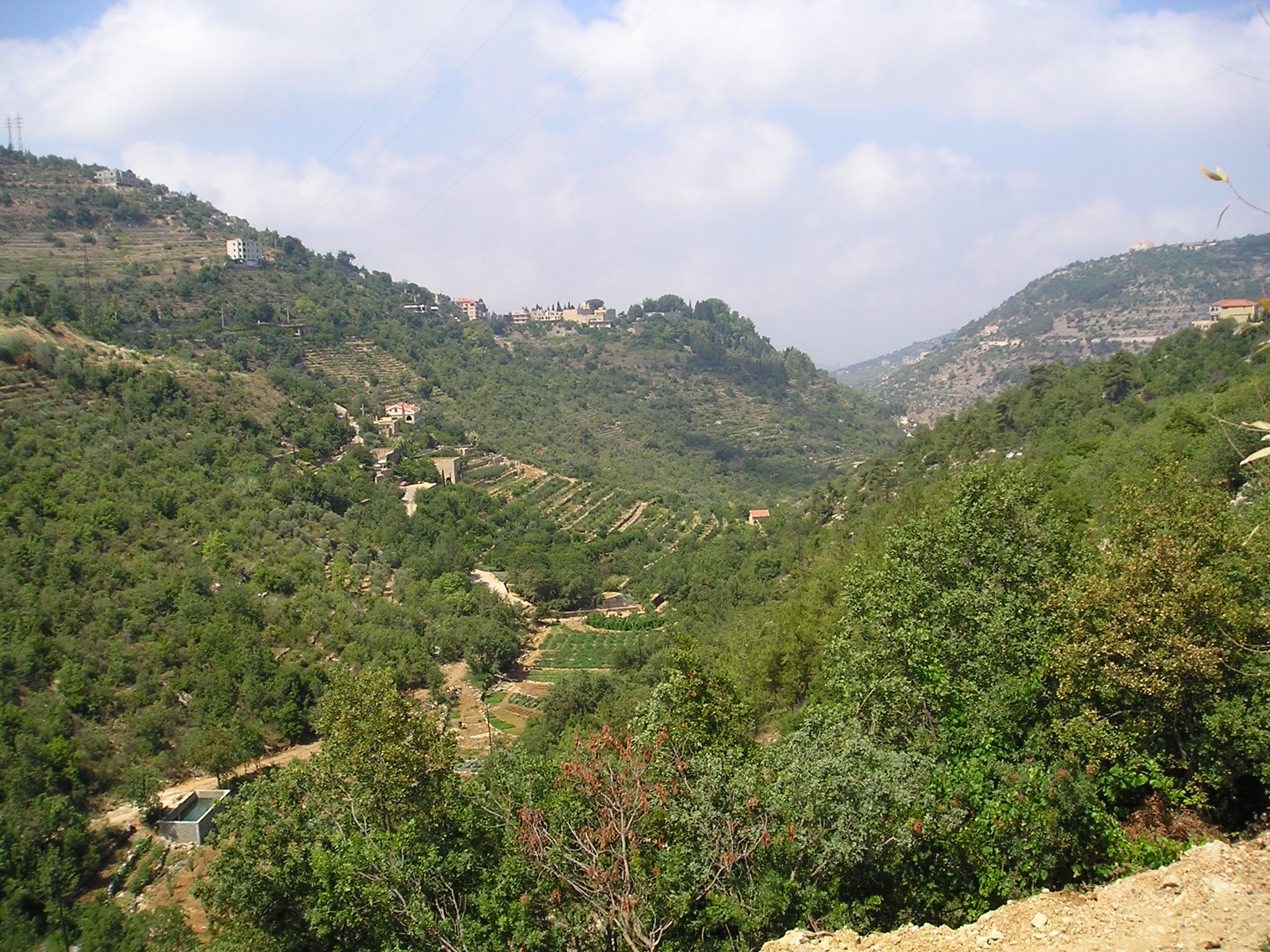
- Chouf Mountains

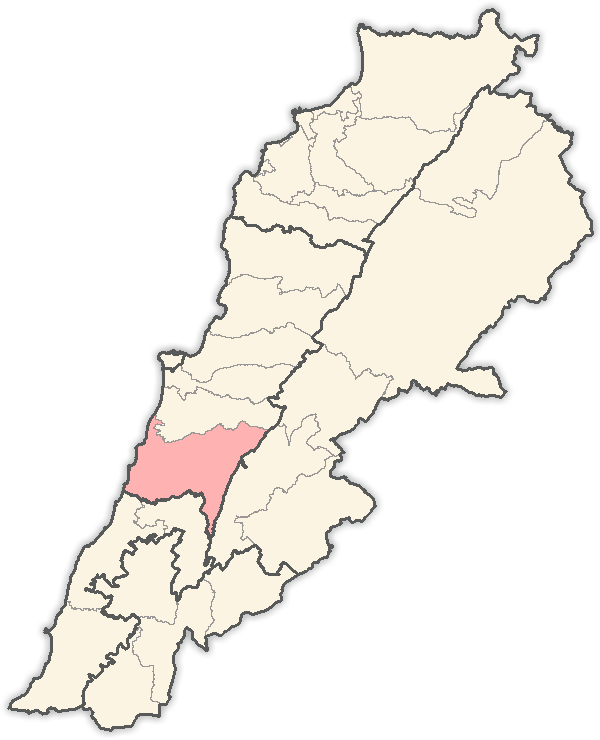
- Location in Lebanon
- Coordinates: 33°41′44″N 35°34′49″E
- Country: Lebanon
- Governorate: Mount Lebanon Governorate
- Capital: Beiteddine

Area
  - Land: 191 sq mi (495 km^{2})

Population
  - Estimate (31 December 2017): 231,427
- Time zone: UTC+2 (EET)
  - Summer (DST): UTC+3 (EEST)

Chouf (also spelled Shouf, Shuf or Chuf; Arabic: جبل الشوف, romanized: Jabal ash-Shūf) is a historic region of Lebanon, as well as an administrative district in the governorate (muhafazat) of Mount Lebanon.

== Geography ==
Located south-east of Beirut, the region comprises a narrow coastal strip notable for the Christian town of Damour, and the valleys and mountains of the western slopes of Jabal Barouk, the name of the local Mount Lebanon massif, on which the largest forest of Cedars of Lebanon is found. The mountains are high enough to receive snow.

== History ==
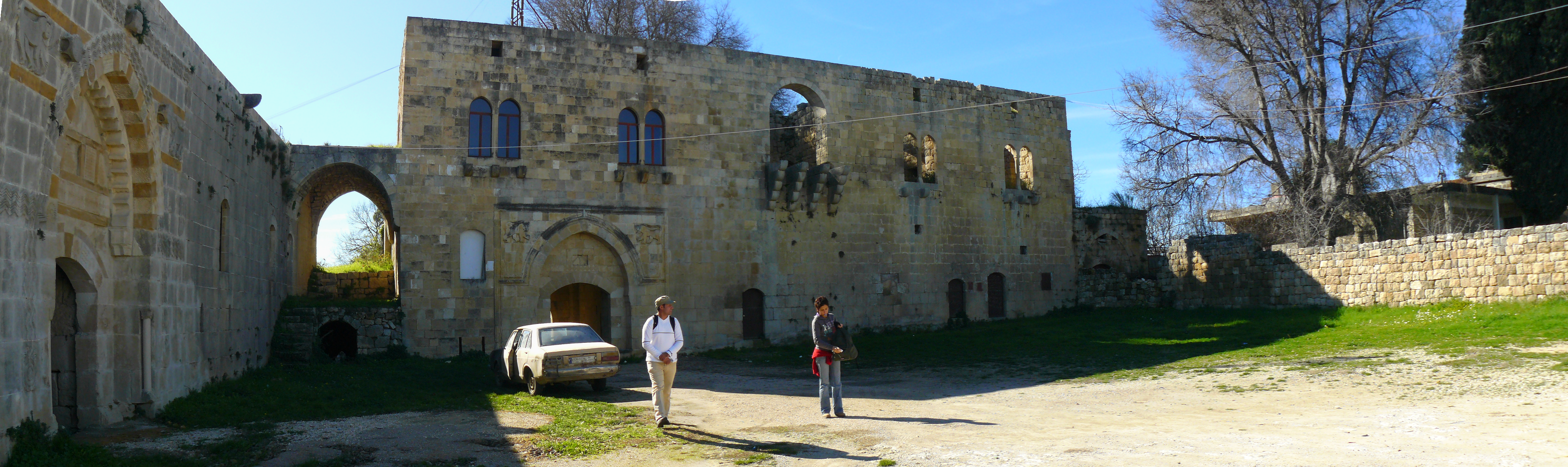
Remains of a palace in Baadarâne, Chouf, Lebanon

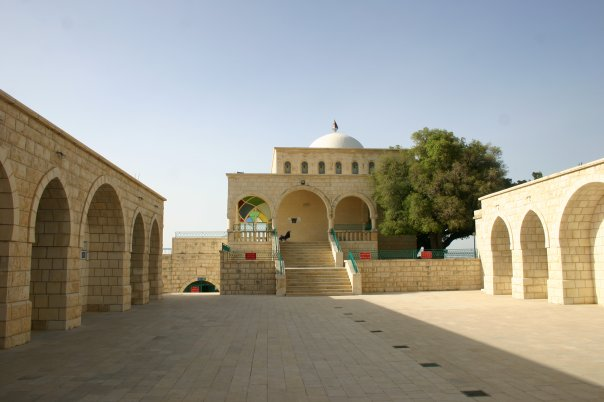
Prophet Job shrine in Niha village, Chouf, Lebanon

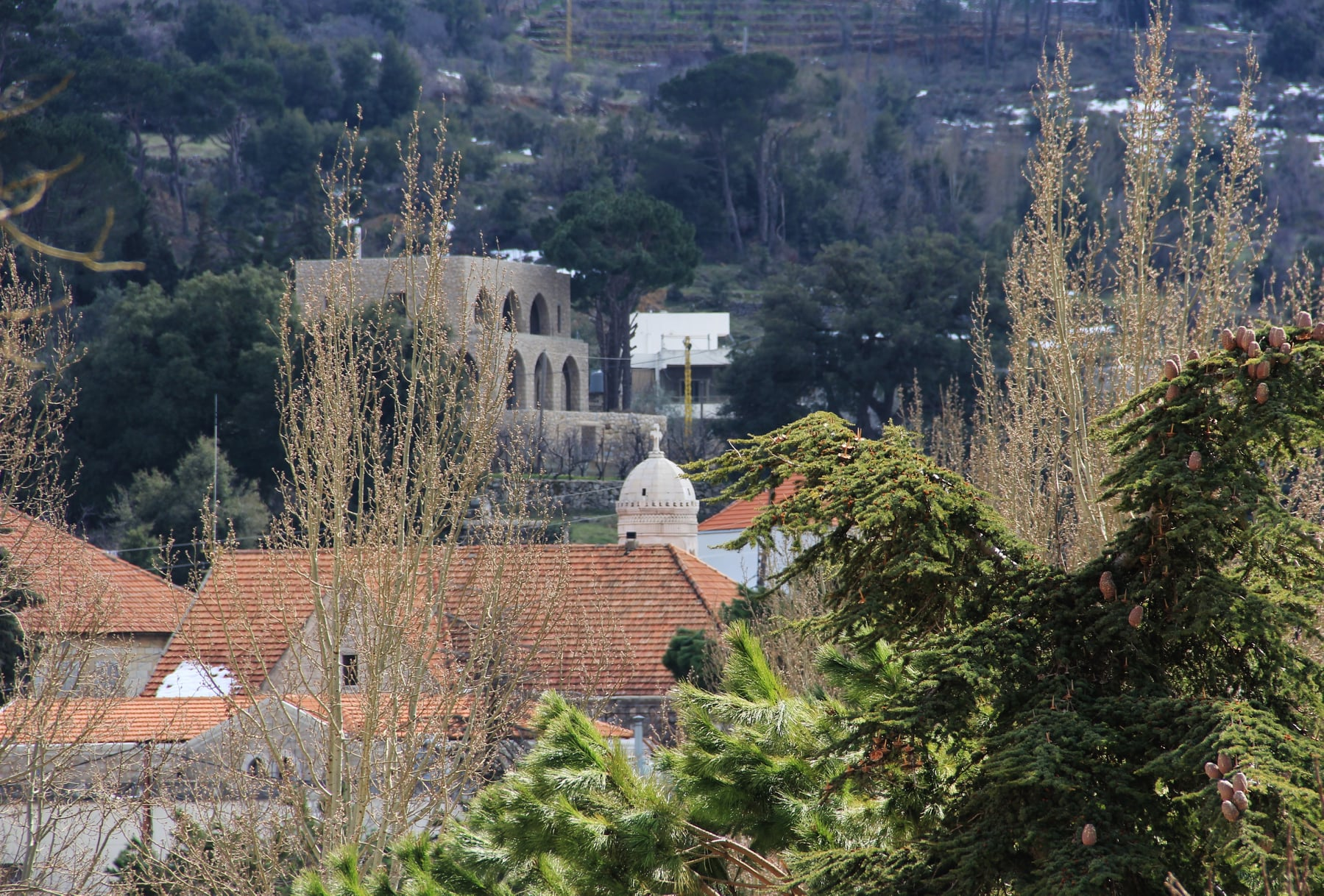
Christian Church and Druze shrine in Maaser el Chouf: Historically, the Druze and the Christians in the Shuf Mountains have lived in complete harmony.

The Emirs of Mount Lebanon resided in Chouf, most notably Druze Emir Fakhr al-Din II, who attained considerable power and autonomy from the Ottoman Empire in the 17th century. He is often referred to as the founder of modern Lebanon although his area of influence and control included parts of Palestine and Syria. Another emir is Bachir Chehab II, who built the palace of Beiteddine during the first half of the 19th century. Deir al Qamar (the monastery of the Moon) is also in the Chouf region.

The relationship between the Druze and Christians in Chouf was characterized by peaceful coexistence. In the early eighteenth century, the communities lived side by side in relative harmony.

However, in 1848, 1860, and again in 1983-1984, during the Lebanese Civil War (Mountain War, Arabic: Harb el-Jabal), fighting broke out between the Christian and Druze communities in the Chouf.

At the end of January 1989, Druze leader Walid Jumblatt, who lived at the Jumblatt palace in the town of Moukhtara, came up with a plan to help Christians return to their homes after an estimated 300,000 had fled during the fighting. The initiative was supported by Dany Chamoun. In March the plan was shelved following General Michel Aoun’s blockade of the Druze port at Jieh, his shelling of Souq El Gharb and the assassination of one of Jumblatt’s top aides. Reconciliation between the Druze and Christian communities was achieved on August 8, 2001, when the Maronite Patriarch of Antioch, Cardinal Mar Nasrallah Boutros Sfeir made a historic visit to the Chouf and met with Jumblatt.

In 1989, Israel carried out air-strikes on the Chouf a few yards from a school. Two militants were killed and several schoolchildren were wounded in the attack.

== Demographics ==
According to voter registration in 2014:

Year	Christians					Muslims			Druze
Year	Total	Maronites	Greek Catholics	Greek Orthodox	Other Christians	Total	Sunnis	Shias	Druze
2014	36.69%	27.58%	6.47%	1.58%	1.06%	31.53%	28.59%	2.94%	31.26%
2018	36.72%	27.22%	6.34%	1.59%	1.57%	32.13%	29.14%	2.99%	31.14%
2022	37.67%	28.13%	6.67%	2.05%	0.82%	31.74%	28.86%	2.88%	30.59%
2026	34.96%	28.06%	6.14%	0.37%	0.39%	33.36%	31.12%	2.24%	31.68%

Number of registered voters (21+ years old) over the years.

Years	Women	Men	Total	Growth (%)
2009	94,110	87,839	181,949	—N/a
2010	94,481 ▲	88,610 ▲	183,091 ▲	+0.62% ▲
2011	94,622 ▲	89,379 ▲	184,001 ▲	+0.49% ▼
2012	95,315 ▲	90,324 ▲	185,639 ▲	+0.88% ▲
2013	97,239 ▲	91,900 ▲	189,139 ▲	+1.85% ▲
2014	98,423 ▲	93,378 ▲	191,801 ▲	+1.39% ▼
2015	99,616 ▲	94,604 ▲	194,220 ▲	+1.25% ▼
2016	100,701 ▲	96,191 ▲	196,892 ▲	+1.36% ▲
2017	102,076 ▲	97,489 ▲	199,565 ▲	+1.34% ▼
2018	103,649 ▲	98,839 ▲	202,488 ▲	+1.44% ▲
2019	105,002 ▲	99,993 ▲	204,995 ▲	+1.22% ▼
2020	106,383 ▲	101,181 ▲	207,564 ▲	+1.24% ▲
2021	107,530 ▲	102,117 ▲	209,647 ▲	+0.99% ▼
2022	109,006 ▲	103,506 ▲	212,512 ▲	+1.35% ▲
2023	109,951 ▲	104,125 ▲	214,076 ▲	+0.73% ▼
2024	110,944 ▲	105,141 ▲	216,085 ▲	+0.93% ▲
2025	111,950 ▲	106,154 ▲	218,104 ▲	+0.93%
2026	—N/a	—N/a	220,478 ▲	+1.08% ▲
Source: DGCS

== Notable residents ==
- Antoine Lahad (1927–2015), Lebanese Army Major General, and subsequently leader of the South Lebanon Army

== See also ==
- Iqlim al-Kharrub, historical region located in the Chouf District
